= Standard day =

The term standard day is used throughout meteorology, aviation, and other sciences and disciplines as a way of defining certain properties of the atmosphere in a manner which allows those who use our atmosphere to effectively calculate and communicate its properties at any given time. For example, a temperature deviation of +8 °C means that the air at any given altitude is 8 °C (14 °F) warmer than what standard day conditions and the measurement altitude would predict, and would indicate a higher density altitude. These variations are extremely important to both meteorologists and aviators, as they strongly determine the different properties of the atmosphere.

For example, on a cool day, an airliner might have no problem safely departing a medium length runway, but on a warmer day, the density altitude might be higher, require a higher ground speed and true airspeed prior to liftoff, which would require more acceleration, a longer runway, and a reduced climb rate after liftoff. The pilot may choose to reduce the gross weight of the aircraft by carrying less fuel or reducing the amount/weight of the cargo, or even reducing the number of passengers (usually the last option). Not carrying sufficient fuel to complete the flight to the destination, the pilot would plan an intermediate fuel stop, which would likely delay the final destination arrival time. In meteorology, departure from standard day conditions is what gives rise to all weather phenomena, including thunderstorms, fronts, clouds, even the heating and cooling of our planet.

== Standard day parameters ==
For Pilots: At sea level, Altimeter:29.92 in/Hg at 15 °C (59 °F) The "standard day" model of the atmosphere is defined at sea level, with certain present conditions such as temperature and pressure. But other factors, such as humidity, further alter the nature of the atmosphere, and are also defined under standard day conditions:

- Density (ρ): 1.225 kg/m^{3} (0.00237 slug/ft^{3})
- Pressure (p): 101.325 kPa (14.7 lb/ in^{2})
- Temperature (T): 15 °C (59 °F)
- Viscosity (μ): 17.3 μN·s/m^{2} (3.62 × 10^{−7} lb s/ft^{2})

The first three properties are usually referred as "standard day" conditions, which the viscosity aspect is largely ignored throughout the aviation community. However, viscosity, which is affected by humidity levels, plays a key role in aerodynamic drag, which is why it is a key component of standard day conditions. Because it is a key component of drag, it affects the amount of fuel burned per unit of distance travelled.
