= Kuwait Science and Natural History Museum =

History museum in Kuwait

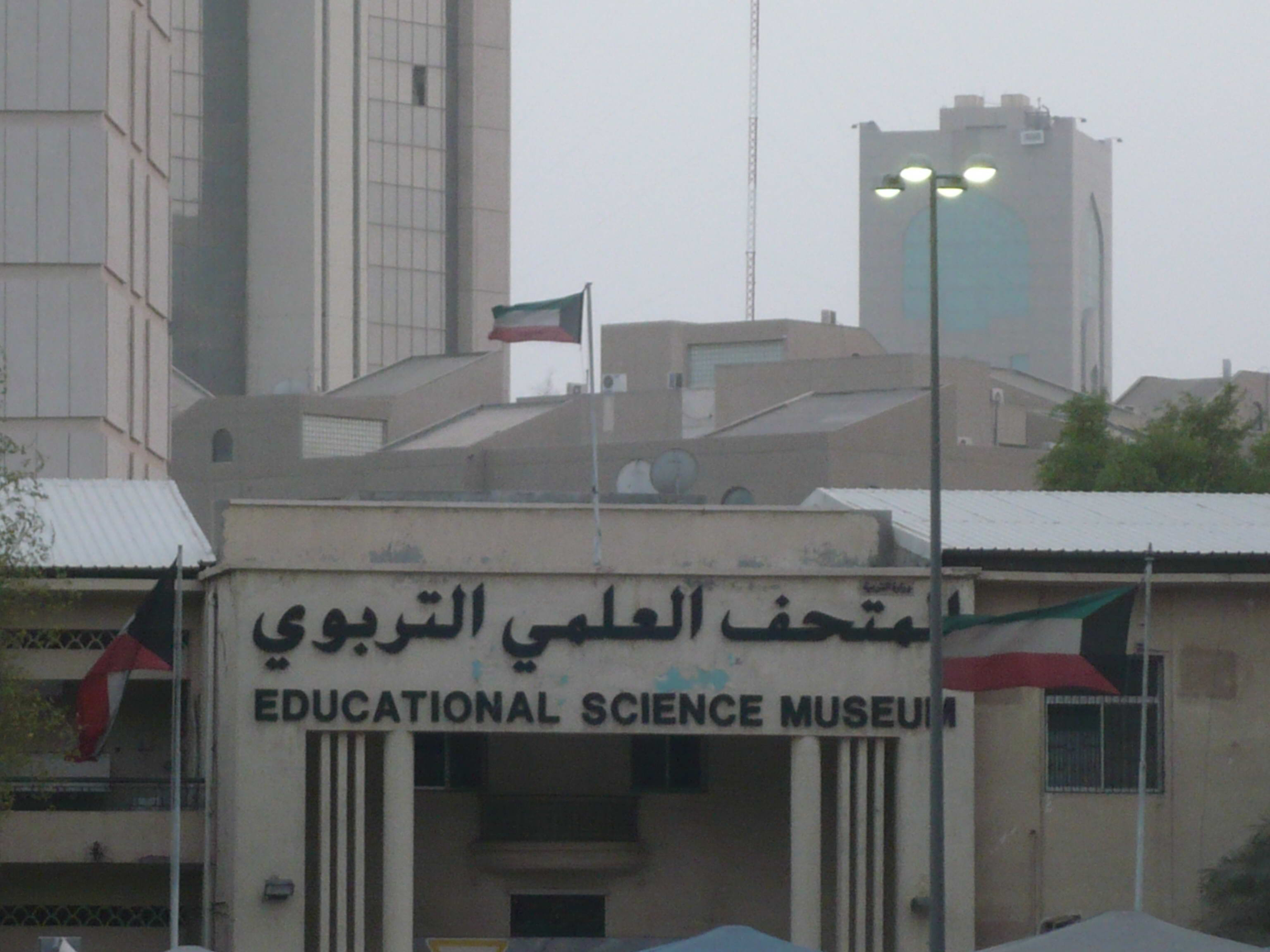
- Established: 1972
- Location: Safat, Kuwait City, Kuwait
- Type: History museum
- Owner: Kuwaiti Ministry of Education

The Kuwait Science and Natural History Museum is a museum in Safat, Kuwait City, Kuwait, located on Abdullah Al-Mobarak Street. The museum is operated and managed by the Ministry of Education.

== History and profile ==
The museum was opened in 1972. It explores the country's technological and scientific progress and it contains artifacts and demonstrations of the Petroleum industry in Kuwait. It is a member of the International Council of Museums.

The museum is organized in the following departments: Natural history department, space science department, planetarium, electronics department, machinery department, zoology department, aviation department and a health hall.
