= Position error =

Position error is one of the errors affecting the systems in an aircraft for measuring airspeed and altitude. It is not practical or necessary for an aircraft to have an airspeed indicating system and an altitude indicating system that are exactly accurate. A small amount of error is tolerable. It is caused by the location of the static vent that supplies air pressure to the airspeed indicator and altimeter; there is no position on an aircraft where, at all angles of attack, the static pressure is always equal to atmospheric pressure.

== Static system ==
All aircraft are equipped with a small hole in the surface of the aircraft called the static port. The air pressure in the vicinity of the static port is conveyed by a conduit to the altimeter and the airspeed indicator. This static port and the conduit constitute the aircraft's static system. The objective of the static system is to sense the pressure of the air at the altitude at which the aircraft is flying. In an ideal static system the air pressure fed to the altimeter and airspeed indicator is equal to the pressure of the air at the altitude at which the aircraft is flying.

As the air flows past an aircraft in flight, the streamlines are affected by the presence of the aircraft, and the speed of the air relative to the aircraft is different at different positions on the aircraft's outer surface. In consequence of Bernoulli's principle, the different speeds of the air result in different pressures at different positions on the aircraft's surface. The ideal position for a static port is a position where the local air pressure in flight is always equal to the pressure remote from the aircraft, however there is no position on an aircraft where this ideal situation exists for all angles of attack. When deciding on a position for a static port, aircraft designers attempt to find a position where the error between static pressure and free-stream pressure is a minimum across the operating range of angle of attack of the aircraft. The residual error at any given angle of attack is called the position error.

Position error affects the indicated airspeed and the indicated altitude. Aircraft manufacturers use the aircraft flight manual to publish details of the error in indicated airspeed and indicated altitude across the operating range of speeds. In many aircraft, the effect of position error on airspeed is shown as the difference between indicated airspeed and calibrated airspeed. In some low-speed aircraft, the position error is shown as the difference between indicated airspeed and equivalent airspeed.

== Pitot system ==
Bernoulli's principle states that total pressure (or stagnation pressure) is constant along a streamline and in any region of irrotational flow. There is no variation in stagnation pressure, regardless of the position on the streamline where it is measured. There is no position error associated with stagnation pressure.

The pitot tube supplies pressure to the airspeed indicator. Pitot pressure is equal to stagnation pressure providing the pitot tube is aligned with the local airflow, it is located outside the boundary layer, and outside the wash from the propeller. Pitot pressure can suffer alignment error but it is not vulnerable to position error.

== Aircraft design standards ==
Aircraft design standards specify a maximum amount of Pitot-static system error. The error in indicated altitude must not be excessive because it is important for pilots to know their altitude with reasonable accuracy for the purpose of traffic separation. US Federal Aviation Regulations, Part 23, §23.1325(e) includes the following requirement for the static pressure system:

- The system error, in indicated pressure altitude, ..., may not exceed ±30 feet (9.1 m) per 100 knots (190 km/h) speed for the [operating speed range for the aircraft].

The error in indicated airspeed must also not be excessive. Part 23, §23.1323(b) includes the following requirement for the airspeed indicating system:

- The system error, including position error, ..., may not exceed three percent of the calibrated airspeed or 5 knots (9.3 km/h), whichever is greater, throughout the [operating speed range for the aircraft].

== Measuring position error ==
For the purpose of complying with an aircraft design standard that specifies a maximum permissible error in the airspeed indicating system it is necessary to measure the position error in a representative aircraft. There are many different methods for measuring position error. Some of the more common methods are:

- use of a GNSS receiver while flying a triangular course
- trailing conduit with static source, stabilized by a plastic cone
- tower fly-by with photographs of the passing aircraft taken from the tower to accurately show the height of the aircraft above or below the tower
- trailing bob with both Pitot and static sources

After the position error has been measured across the operating speed range of an aircraft the position error correction (PEC) is made available to engineers and pilots.

== See also ==
- Airspeed
- Altitude
- Global Positioning System
- Pitot-static system
- Reduced vertical separation minima
