= Airspeed =

Speed of an aircraft relative to the surrounding air

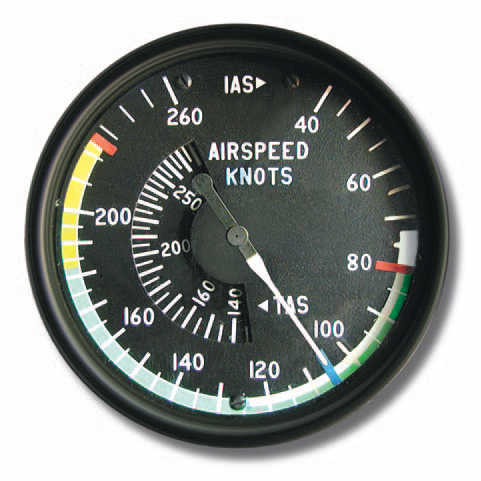
An airspeed indicator is a flight instrument that displays airspeed. This airspeed indicator has standardized markings for a multiengine airplane.

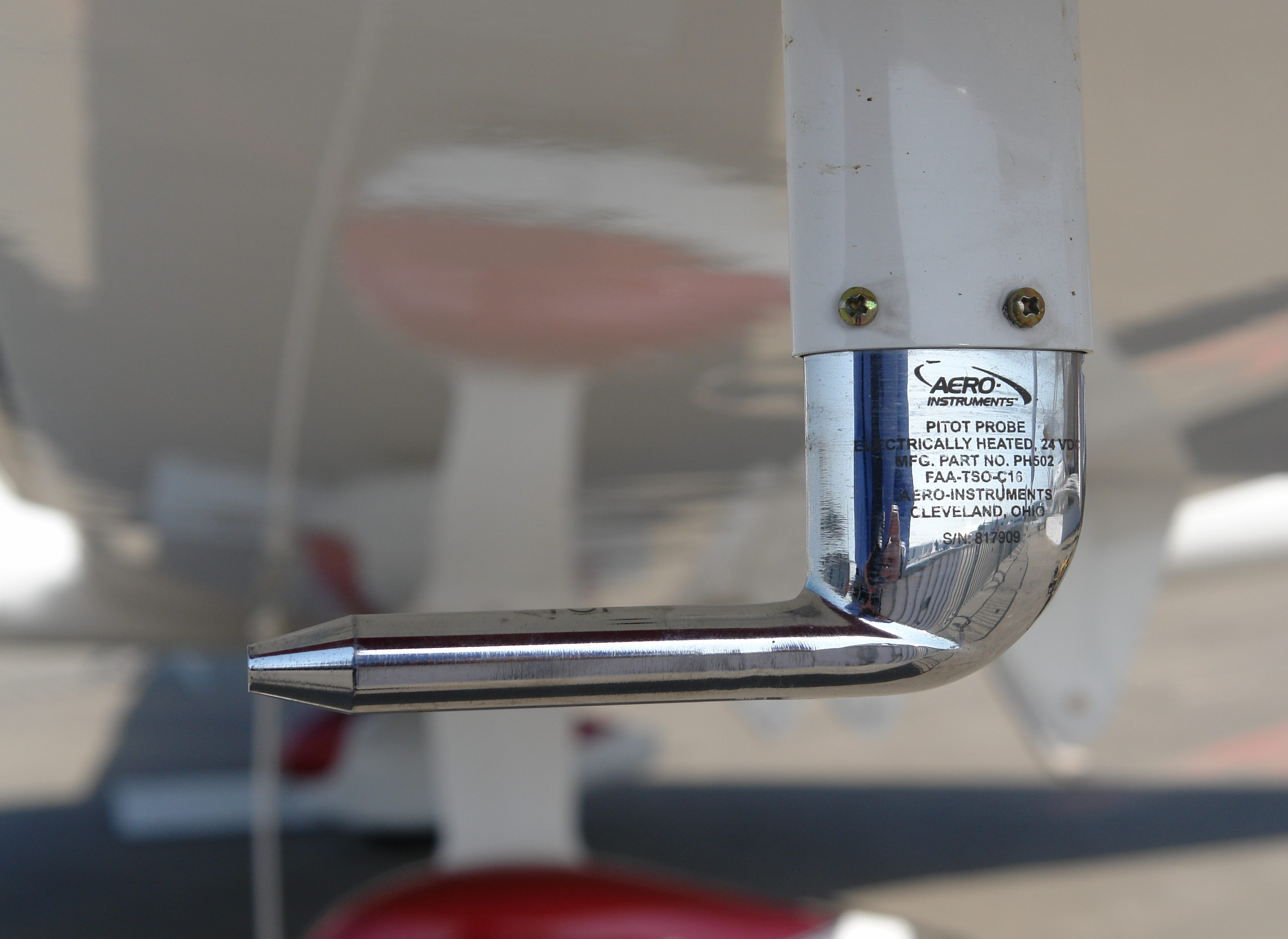
Aircraft have pitot tubes for measuring airspeed.

In aviation, airspeed is the speed of an aircraft relative to the air it is flying through (which itself is usually moving relative to the ground due to wind). In contrast, the ground speed is the speed of an aircraft with respect to the surface of the Earth (whether over land or presumed-stationary water). It is difficult to measure the exact airspeed of the aircraft (true airspeed), but other measures of airspeed, such as indicated airspeed and Mach number give useful information about the capabilities and limitations of airplane performance. The common measures of airspeed are:

- Indicated airspeed (IAS), what is read on an airspeed gauge connected to a pitot-static system.
- Calibrated airspeed (CAS), indicated airspeed adjusted for pitot system position and installation error.
- True airspeed (TAS) is the actual speed the airplane is moving through the air. When combined with aircraft direction, wind speed and direction, it can be used to calculate ground speed and direction.
- Equivalent airspeed (EAS) is true airspeed times root density ratio. It is a useful way of calculating aerodynamic loads and airplane performance at low speeds when the flow can be considered incompressible.
- Mach number is a measure of how fast the airplane is flying relative to the speed of sound.

The measurement and indication of airspeed is ordinarily accomplished on board an aircraft by an airspeed indicator (ASI) connected to a pitot-static system. The pitot-static system comprises one or more pitot probes (or tubes) facing the on-coming air flow to measure pitot pressure (also called stagnation, total or ram pressure) and one or more static ports to measure the static pressure in the air flow. These two pressures are compared by the ASI to give an IAS reading. Airspeed indicators are designed to give true airspeed at sea level pressure and standard temperature. As the aircraft climbs into less dense air, its true airspeed is greater than the airspeed indicated on the ASI.

Calibrated airspeed is typically within a few knots of indicated airspeed, while equivalent airspeed decreases slightly from CAS as aircraft altitude increases or at high speeds.

== Units ==
Airspeed is commonly given in knots (kn). Since 2010, the International Civil Aviation Organization (ICAO) recommends using kilometers per hour (km/h) for airspeed (and meters per second for wind speed on runways), but allows using the de facto standard of knots, and has no set date on when to stop.

Depending on the country of manufacture or which era in aviation history, airspeed indicators on aircraft instrument panels have been configured to read in knots, kilometers per hour, miles per hour. In high altitude flight, the Mach number is sometimes used for reporting airspeed.

== Indicated airspeed ==
Indicated airspeed (IAS) is the airspeed indicator reading (ASIR) uncorrected for instrument, position, and other errors. From current EASA definitions: Indicated airspeed means the speed of an aircraft as shown on its pitot static airspeed indicator calibrated to reflect standard atmosphere adiabatic compressible flow at sea level uncorrected for airspeed system errors.

An airspeed indicator is a differential pressure gauge with the pressure reading expressed in units of speed, rather than pressure. The airspeed is derived from the difference between the ram air pressure from the pitot tube, or stagnation pressure, and the static pressure. The pitot tube is mounted facing forward; the static pressure is frequently detected at static ports on one or both sides of the aircraft. Sometimes both pressure sources are combined in a single probe, a pitot-static tube. The static pressure measurement is subject to error due to inability to place the static ports at positions where the pressure is true static pressure at all airspeeds and attitudes. The correction for this error is the position error correction (PEC) and varies for different aircraft and airspeeds. Further errors of 10% or more are common if the airplane is flown in "uncoordinated" flight.

=== Uses of indicated airspeed ===
Indicated airspeed is a better measure of power required and lift available than true airspeed. Therefore, IAS is used for controlling the aircraft during taxiing, takeoff, climb, descent, approach or landing. Target speeds for best rate of climb, best range, and best endurance are given in terms of indicated speed. The airspeed structural limit, beyond which the forces on panels may become too high or wing flutter may occur, is often given in terms of IAS.

== Calibrated airspeed ==
Calibrated airspeed (CAS) is indicated airspeed corrected for instrument errors, position error (due to incorrect pressure at the static port) and installation errors.

Calibrated airspeed values less than the speed of sound at standard sea level (661.4788 knots) are calculated as follows:

$V_c=a_0\sqrt{\bigg(\frac{2}{\gamma-1}\bigg)\Bigg[\bigg(\frac{q_c}{p_0}+1\bigg)^\frac{\gamma-1}{\gamma}-1\Bigg]}$ minus position and installation error correction.

where
$V_c \,$ is the calibrated airspeed,
$a_0 \,$ is speed of sound at standard sea level
$\gamma \,$ is the ratio of specific heats (1.4 for air)
$q_c \,$ is the impact pressure, the difference between total pressure and static pressure
$p_0 \,$ is the static air pressure at standard sea level

This expression is based on the form of Bernoulli's equation applicable to isentropic compressible flow. CAS is the same as true air speed at sea level standard conditions, but becomes smaller relative to true airspeed as we climb into lower pressure and cooler air. Nevertheless, it remains a good measure of the forces acting on the airplane, meaning stall speeds can be called out on the airspeed indicator. The values for $p_0$ and $a_0$ are consistent with the ISA i.e. the conditions under which airspeed indicators are calibrated.

== True airspeed ==
The true airspeed (TAS; also KTAS, for knots true airspeed) of an aircraft is the speed of the aircraft relative to the air in which it is flying. The true airspeed and heading of an aircraft constitute its velocity relative to the atmosphere.

=== Uses of true airspeed ===
The true airspeed is important information for accurate navigation of an aircraft. To maintain a desired ground track whilst flying in a moving airmass, the pilot of an aircraft must use knowledge of wind speed, wind direction, and true air speed to determine the required heading. See wind triangle.

TAS is the appropriate speed to use when calculating the range of an airplane. It is the speed normally listed on the flight plan, also used in flight planning, before considering the effects of wind.

=== Measurement of true airspeed ===
A mechanical airspeed indicator for an airplane, showing IAS in knots (inner scale on black background) and miles per hour (outer scale on black background). The pilot sets the pressure altitude and air temperature in the top window using the knob; the needle indicates true airspeed in the lower left window (white background).

True airspeed is calculated from calibrated airspeed as follows

$V = V_c\sqrt{\theta \frac{(1 + q_c/ p)^{(\gamma - 1)/\gamma} - 1}{(1 + q_c/ p_0)^{(\gamma - 1)/\gamma} - 1}}$

where

$V\,$ is true airspeed
$\theta \,$ is the temperature ratio, namely local over standard sea level temperature, $T/T_0$

Some airspeed indicators include a TAS scale, which is set by entering outside air temperature and pressure altitude. Alternatively, TAS can be calculated using an E6-B flight computer or equivalent, given inputs of CAS, outside air temperature (OAT) and pressure altitude.

== Equivalent airspeed ==
Equivalent airspeed (EAS) is defined as the airspeed at sea level in the International Standard Atmosphere at which the (incompressible) dynamic pressure is the same as the dynamic pressure at the true airspeed (TAS) and altitude at which the aircraft is flying. That is, it is defined by the equation

$\frac{1}{2} \rho_0 {V_e}^2 = \frac{1}{2} \rho V^2$

where

$V_e\,$ is equivalent airspeed
$V\,$ is true airspeed
$\rho\,$ is the density of air at the altitude at which the aircraft is currently flying;
$\rho_0\,$ is the density of air at sea level in the International Standard Atmosphere (1.225 kg/m^{3} or 0.00237 slug/ft^{3}).

Stated differently,

$$V_e \equiv V\sqrt{\sigma}$$

where

$\sigma$ is the density ratio, that is $\frac{\rho}{\rho_0}$

=== Uses of equivalent airspeed ===
EAS is a measure of airspeed that is a function of incompressible dynamic pressure. Structural analysis is often in terms of incompressible dynamic pressure, so equivalent airspeed is a useful speed for structural testing. The significance of equivalent airspeed is that, at Mach numbers below the onset of wave drag, all of the aerodynamic forces and moments on an aircraft are proportional to the square of the equivalent airspeed. Thus, the handling and 'feel' of an aircraft, and the aerodynamic loads upon it, at a given equivalent airspeed, are very nearly constant and equal to those at standard sea level irrespective of the actual flight conditions.

At standard sea level pressure, CAS and EAS are equal. Up to about 200 knots CAS and 10,000 ft (3,000 m) the difference is negligible, but at higher speeds and altitudes CAS diverges from EAS due to compressibility.

== Mach number ==
Mach number $M$ is defined as

$M = \frac{V}{a}$

where

$V \,$ is true airspeed
$a \,$ is the local speed of sound

Both the Mach number and the speed of sound can be computed using measurements of impact pressure, static pressure and outside air temperature.

=== Uses of Mach number ===
For aircraft that fly close to, but below the speed of sound (i.e. most civil jets) the compressibility speed limit is given in terms of Mach number. Beyond this speed, Mach buffet or stall or tuck may occur.

== See also ==
- ICAO recommendations on use of the International System of Units
- Acronyms and abbreviations in avionics
- Flight instruments
- Maneuvering speed
- V speeds

== Bibliography ==
- Glauert H. (1947). "2". The Elements of Aerofoil and Airscrew Theory. Cambridge University Press. ISBN 9781139241953.
- William Gracey (May 1980). Measurement of Aircraft Airspeed and Altitude (PDF). NASA.
- Getting to grips with aircraft performance (PDF). Flight Operations Support & Line Assistance. Airbus Customer Services. January 2002.
