= Machmeter =

Flight instrument

Illustration showing the face of a Machmeter reading a Mach number of 0.83

A Machmeter is an aircraft pitot-static system flight instrument that shows the ratio of the true airspeed to the speed of sound, a dimensionless quantity called Mach number. This is shown on a Machmeter as a decimal fraction. An aircraft flying at the speed of sound is flying at a Mach number of one, expressed as Mach 1.

== Use ==
As an aircraft in transonic flight approaches the speed of sound, it first reaches its critical mach number, where air flowing over low-pressure areas of its surface locally reaches the speed of sound, forming shock waves. The indicated airspeed for this condition changes with ambient temperature, which in turn changes with altitude. Therefore, indicated airspeed is not entirely adequate to warn the pilot of the impending problems. Mach number is more useful, and most high-speed aircraft are limited to a maximum operating Mach number, also known as M_{MO}.

For example, if the M_{MO} is Mach 0.83, then at 9,100 m (30,000 ft) where the speed of sound under standard conditions is 1,093 kilometres per hour (590 kn), the true airspeed at M_{MO} is 906 kilometres per hour (489 kn). The speed of sound increases with air temperature, so at Mach 0.83 at 3,000 m (10,000 ft) where the air is much warmer than at 9,100 m (30,000 ft), the true airspeed at M_{MO} would be 982 km/h (530 kn).

== Operation ==
Modern electronic Machmeters use information from an air data computer system which makes calculations using inputs from a pitot-static system. Some older mechanical Machmeters use an altitude aneroid and an airspeed capsule which together convert pitot-static pressure into Mach number. The Machmeter suffers from instrument and position errors.

== Calibration ==
In subsonic flow the Mach meter can be calibrated according to
$$M = \sqrt{5\left[\left(\frac{q_\text{c}}{p} + 1\right)^\frac{2}{7} - 1\right]},
\quad \text{or} \quad
M = \sqrt{5\left[\left(\frac{p_\text{t}}{p}\right)^\frac{2}{7} - 1\right]},$$
where $M$ is Mach number, q_{c} is impact pressure (dynamic pressure), $p$ is static pressure, and assuming the ratio of specific heats is 1.4.

When a shock wave forms across the Pitot tube, the required formula is derived from the Rayleigh supersonic Pitot equation and is solved iteratively:
$$M = 0.88128485 \sqrt{\frac{p_\text{t}}{p}\left(1 - \frac{1}{7M^2}\right)^\frac{5}{2}},$$
where $p_\text{t}$ is now total pressure measured behind the normal shock.

Note that the inputs required are total pressure and static pressure. Air temperature input is not required.

== See also ==
- ICAO recommendations on use of the International System of Units
- Airspeed indicator
- Mach number
- Pitot-static system
