= Equivalent airspeed =

Airspeed corrected for the compressibility of air at high speeds

In aviation, equivalent airspeed (EAS) is calibrated airspeed (CAS) corrected for the compressibility of air at a non-trivial Mach number. It is also the airspeed at sea level in the International Standard Atmosphere at which the dynamic pressure is the same as the dynamic pressure at the true airspeed (TAS) and altitude at which the aircraft is flying. In low-speed flight, it is the speed which would be shown by an airspeed indicator with zero error. It is useful for predicting aircraft handling, aerodynamic loads, stalling etc.

$\mathrm{EAS} = \mathrm{TAS} \times \sqrt{\frac{\rho}{\rho_0}}$

where ρ is actual air density and ρ_{0} is standard sea level density (1.225 kg/m^{3} or 0.00237 slug/ft^{3}).

EAS is a function of dynamic pressure:

$\mathrm{EAS} = \sqrt{\frac{2q}{\rho_0}}$

where q is the dynamic pressure $q = \tfrac12\, \rho\, v^{2}.$

EAS can also be obtained from the aircraft Mach number and static pressure.

$\mathrm{EAS} ={a_0} M \sqrt{P\over P_0}$

where a_{0} is 1,225 km/h (661.45 kn) (the standard speed of sound at 15 °C), M is the Mach number, P is static pressure, and P_{0} is standard sea level pressure (1013.25 hPa).

Combining the above with the expression for Mach number gives EAS as a function of impact pressure and static pressure (valid for subsonic flow):

$\mathrm{EAS} = a_0 \sqrt{ \frac{5P}{P_0} \left[\left( \frac{q_c}P + 1 \right)^\frac{2}{7} - 1 \right]}$

where q_{c} is impact pressure.

At standard sea level, EAS is the same as calibrated airspeed (CAS) and true airspeed (TAS). At any other altitude, EAS may be obtained from CAS by correcting for compressibility error.

The following simplified formula allows calculation of CAS from EAS:

$\mathrm{CAS} = {\mathrm{EAS} \times \left[ 1 + \frac{1}{8}(1 - \delta)M^2 + \frac{3}{640}(1 - 10\delta + 9\delta^2)M^4 \right]}$

where the pressure ratio $\delta = \tfrac{P}{P_0},$ and CAS, EAS are airspeeds and can be measured in knots, km/h, mph or any other appropriate unit.

The above formula is accurate within 1% up to Mach 1.2 and useful with acceptable error up to Mach 1.5. The 4th order Mach term can be neglected for speeds below Mach 0.85.

== See also ==
- Acronyms and abbreviations in avionics
- ICAO recommendations on use of the International System of Units
- Calibrated airspeed
- Flight instruments
- Global Positioning System
- Indicated airspeed
- Position error
- True airspeed
