= Indicated airspeed =

Displayed on the airspeed indicator on an aircraft

A basic airspeed indicator with the indicated airspeed (IAS) indicated in knots ("Kt" or "Kts" or "KIAS") -- the most common unit of measure for airspeed. Some airspeed indicators in aircraft prior to the mid-1970s indicate in miles per hour plus knots (1 knot = 1.15 mph) or kilometers per hour (1 knot = 1.85 km/h).

A primary flight display with the indicated airspeed (IAS) displayed in the form of a vertical "tape" on the left.

In aviation, the indicated airspeed (IAS) is the airspeed of an aircraft as measured by its pitot-static system and displayed by the airspeed indicator (ASI). This is the pilots' primary airspeed reference.

This value is not corrected for installation error, instrument error, or the actual encountered air density, being instead calibrated to always reflect the adiabatic compressible flow of the International Standard Atmosphere at sea level.

It uses the difference between total pressure and static pressure, provided by the system, to either mechanically or electronically measure dynamic pressure. The dynamic pressure includes terms for both density and airspeed. Since the airspeed indicator cannot know the density, it is by design calibrated to assume the sea level standard atmospheric density when calculating airspeed. Since the actual density will vary considerably from this assumed value as the aircraft changes altitude, IAS varies considerably from true airspeed (TAS), the relative velocity between the aircraft and the surrounding air mass. Calibrated airspeed (CAS) is the IAS corrected for instrument and position error.

An aircraft's indicated airspeed in knots is typically abbreviated KIAS for "Knots-Indicated Air Speed" (vs. KCAS for calibrated airspeed and KTAS for true airspeed).

The IAS is an important value for the pilot because it is the indicated speeds which are specified in the aircraft flight manual for such important performance values as the stall speed. These speeds, in true airspeed terms, vary considerably depending upon density altitude. However, at typical civilian operating speeds, the aircraft's aerodynamic structure responds to dynamic pressure alone, and the aircraft will perform the same when at the same dynamic pressure. Since it is this same dynamic pressure that drives the airspeed indicator, an aircraft will always, for example, stall at the published indicated airspeed (for the current configuration) regardless of density, altitude or true airspeed.

Furthermore, the IAS is specified in some regulations, and by air traffic control when directing pilots, since the airspeed indicator displays that speed (by definition) and it is the pilot's primary airspeed reference when operating below transonic or supersonic speeds.

== Calculation ==
Indicated airspeed measured by pitot-tube can be approximately expressed by the following equation delivered from Bernoulli's equation.

$$IAS \approx \sqrt{\frac{2 (p_t - p_s)}{\rho(0)}}$$

NOTE: The above equation applies only to conditions that can be treated as incompressible. Liquids are treated as incompressible under almost all conditions. Gases under certain conditions can be approximated as incompressible. See Compressibility.

The compression effects can be corrected by use of Poisson constant. This compensation corresponds to equivalent airspeed (EAS).

$$u = \sqrt{ \frac{2 \gamma}{\gamma - 1} \frac{p_s}{\rho} \left[\left(\frac{p_t}{p_s}\right)^\frac{\gamma-1}{\gamma}-1 \right] }$$

where:

- $u$ is indicated airspeed in m/s,
- $p_t$ is stagnation or total pressure in pascals,
- $p_s$ is static pressure in pascals,
- $\rho(0)$ is standard atmosphere fluid density in $kg/m^3$ at sea level, and
- $\ \gamma\,$ is the specific heat capacity ratio (≈1.401 for air).

== IAS vs CAS ==
The IAS is not the actual speed through the air even when the aircraft is at sea level under International Standard Atmosphere conditions (15 °C, 1013 hPa, 0% humidity). The IAS needs to be corrected for known instrument and position errors to show true airspeed under those specific atmospheric conditions, and this is the CAS (Calibrated Airspeed). Despite this the pilot's primary airspeed reference, the ASI, shows IAS (by definition). The relationship between CAS and IAS is known and documented for each aircraft type and model.

== IAS and V speeds ==
The aircraft's pilot manual usually gives critical V speeds as IAS, those speeds indicated by the airspeed indicator. This is because the aircraft behaves similarly at the same IAS no matter what the TAS is: E.g. A pilot landing at a hot and high airfield will use the same IAS to fly the aircraft at the correct approach and landing speeds as when landing at a cold sea level airfield, even though the TAS must differ considerably between the two landings.

Whereas IAS can be reliably used for monitoring critical speeds well below the speed of sound this is not so at higher speeds. An example: Because (1) the compressibility of air changes considerably approaching the speed of sound, and (2) the speed of sound varies considerably with temperature and therefore altitude; the maximum speed at which an aircraft structure is safe, the never exceed speed (abbreviated V_{NE}), is specified at several differing altitudes in faster aircraft's operating manuals, as shown in the sample table below.

Diving below	IAS mph	IAS km/h
30,000 ft (9,100 m)	370	595
25,000 ft (7,600 m)	410	660
20,000 ft (6,100 m)	450	725
15,000 ft (4,600 m)	490	790
10,000 ft (3,000 m)	540	870

Ref: Pilot's Notes for Tempest V Sabre IIA Engine - Air Ministry A.P.2458C-PN

== IAS and navigation ==
For navigation, it is necessary to convert IAS to TAS and/or ground speed (GS) using the following method:

- correct IAS to calibrated airspeed (CAS) using an aircraft-specific correction table;
- correct CAS to true airspeed (TAS) by using Outside Air Temperature (OAT), Pressure-altitude and CAS on an E6-B flight computer or equivalent functionality on most GPSs;
- convert TAS to ground speed (GS) by allowing for the effect of wind.

With the advent of Doppler radar navigation and, more recently, GPS receivers, with other advanced navigation equipment that allows pilots to read ground speed directly, the TAS calculation in-flight is becoming unnecessary for the purposes of navigation estimations.

TAS is the primary method to determine aircraft's cruise performance in manufacturer's specs, speed comparisons and pilot reports.

== Other airspeeds ==
From IAS, the following speeds can also be calculated:

- convert CAS to equivalent airspeed (EAS) by allowing for compressibility effects (not necessary at slow speed or low altitude); EAS is used by aircraft engineers and some very high-altitude flying aircraft such as the U-2 and the SR-71;
- convert EAS to true airspeed (TAS) by allowing for differences in density altitude.

On large jet aircraft the IAS is by far the most important speed indicator. Most aircraft speed limitations are based on IAS, as IAS closely reflects dynamic pressure. TAS is usually displayed as well, but purely for advisory information and generally not in a prominent location.

Modern jet airliners also include ground speed (GS) and Machmeter. Ground speed shows the actual speed that the aircraft is moving past a fixed point the ground. This is usually connected to a GPS or similar system. Ground speed is just a pilot aid to estimate if the flight is on time, behind or ahead of schedule. It is not used for takeoff and landing purposes, since the imperative speed for a flying aircraft always is the speed against the wind.

The Machmeter is, on subsonic aircraft, a warning indicator. Subsonic aircraft must not fly faster than a specific percentage of the speed of sound. Usually passenger airliners do not fly faster than around 85% of speed of sound, or Mach 0.85. Supersonic aircraft like the Concorde and military fighters use the Machmeter as the main speed instrument with the exception of takeoffs and landings.

Some aircraft also have a taxi speed indicator for use on the ground. Since the IAS often starts at around 74–93 km/h (40–50 kn) (on jet airliners), pilots may need extra help while taxiing the aircraft on the ground. Its range is around 0–93 km/h (0–50 kn).

== See also ==
- Acronyms and abbreviations in avionics
- ICAO recommendations on use of the International System of Units
- Air speed
- Calibrated airspeed
- Equivalent airspeed
- Flight instruments
- Satellite navigation
- True airspeed
- Ground speed
