= Pitot tube =

Device which measures fluid flow velocity, typically around an aircraft or boat

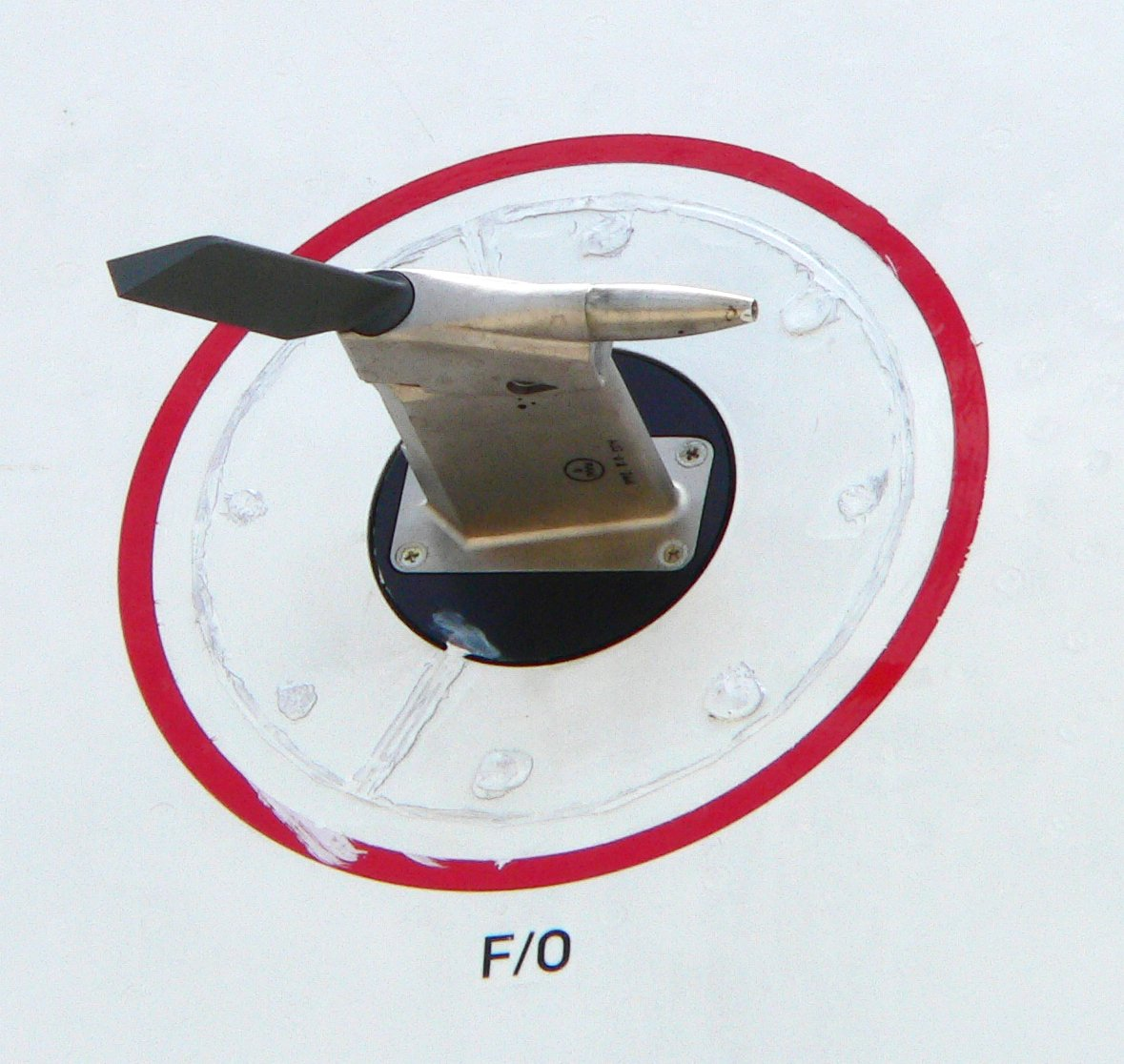
Aircraft use pitot tubes to measure airspeed. This example, from an Airbus A380, combines a pitot tube (right) with a static port and an angle-of-attack vane (left). Air-flow is right to left.

Types of pitot tubes

A pitot-static tube connected to a manometer

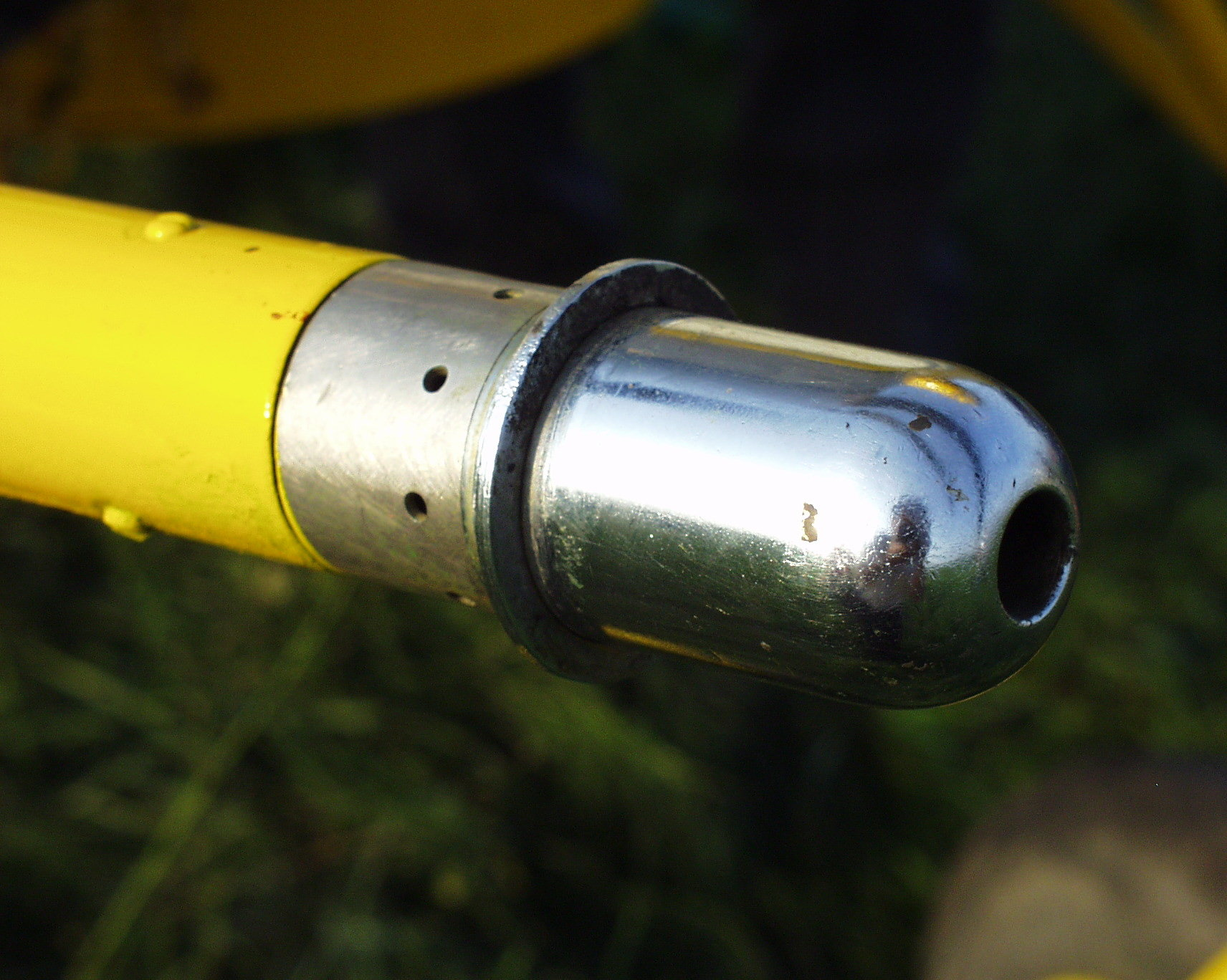
Pitot tube on Kamov Ka-26 helicopter

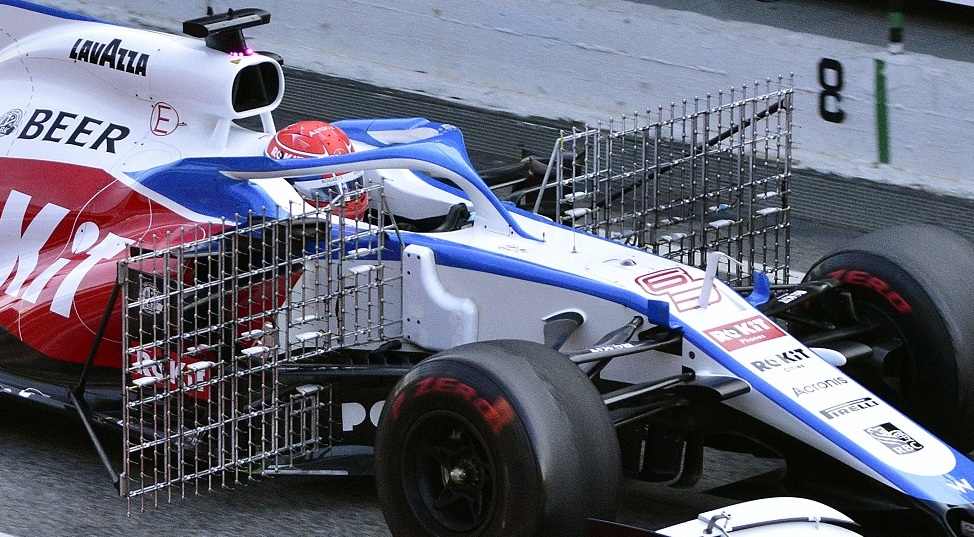
A Formula One car during testing with frames holding many pitot tubes

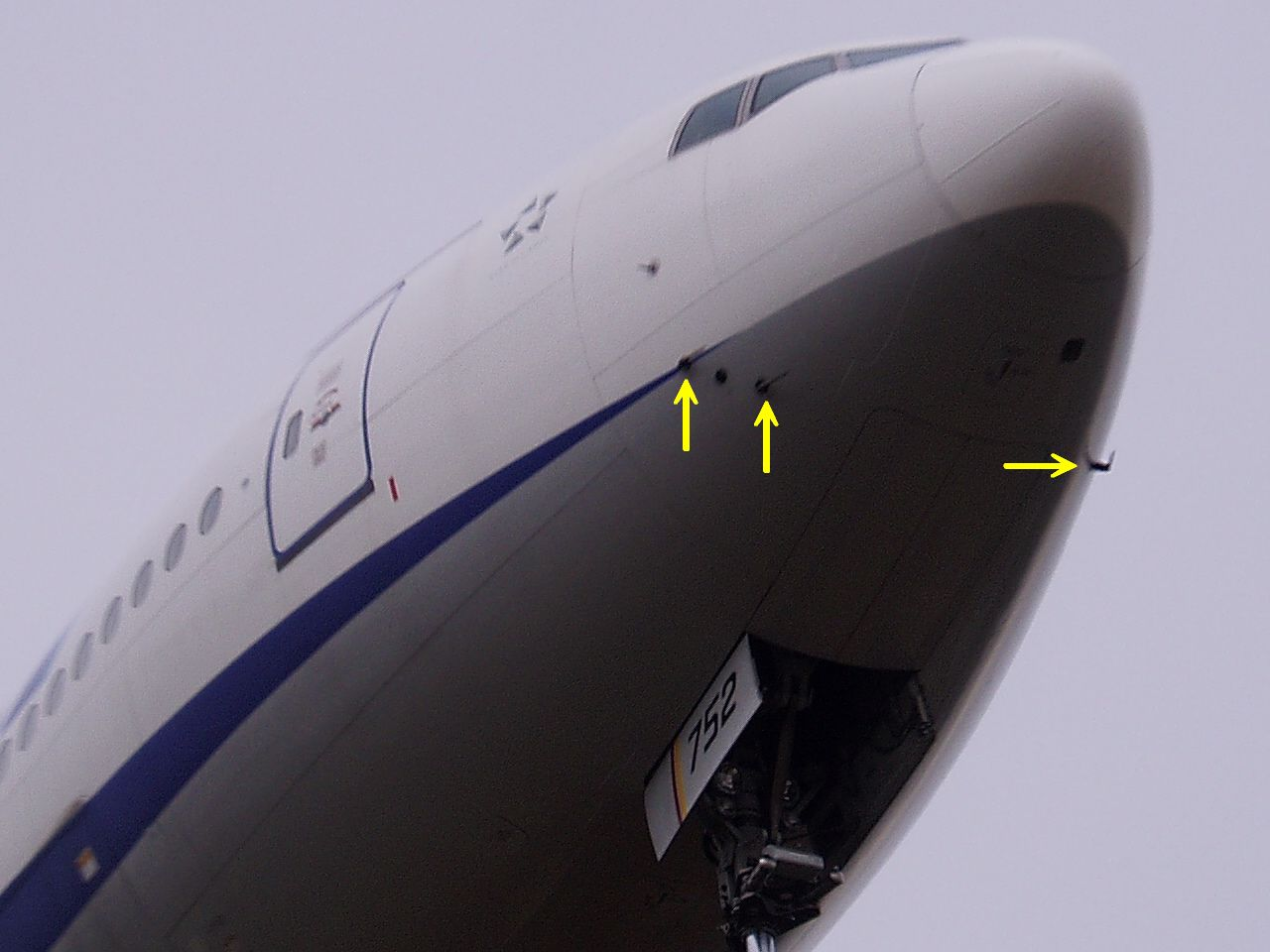
Location of pitot tubes on a Boeing 777

A pitot tube (/ˈpiːtoʊ/ PEE-toh; also pitot probe) measures stagnation pressure, which together with a measured static pressure, is used to calculate flow velocity. It was invented by French engineer Henri Pitot during his work with aqueducts and published in 1732, and modified to its modern form in 1858 by Henry Darcy. It is widely used to determine the airspeed of aircraft; the water speed of boats; and the flow velocity of liquids, air, and gases in industry.

== Theory of operation ==
The basic pitot tube consists of a tube pointing directly into the oncoming fluid flow. Pressure in the tube can be measured as the moving fluid stagnates, as it cannot escape. This pressure is the stagnation pressure of the fluid, also known as the total pressure or (particularly in aviation) the pitot pressure.

The measured stagnation pressure cannot just by itself be used to determine the fluid flow velocity (airspeed in aviation) directly. However, if flows can reasonably be assumed to be incompressible, then with a measured static pressure as well, the fluid velocity can be determined by the use of Bernoulli's equation, which states:

Stagnation pressure = static pressure + dynamic pressure

Which can also be written

$$p_t = p_s + \left(\frac{\rho u^2}{2}\right)$$

Solving that for flow velocity gives

$$u = \sqrt{\frac{2 (p_t - p_s)}{\rho}}$$

where

- $u$ is the flow velocity;
- $p_t$ is the stagnation or total pressure;
- $p_s$ is the static pressure;
- and $\rho$ is the fluid density.

This equation applies only to fluids that can be treated as incompressible. Liquids are treated as incompressible under almost all conditions. Gases under certain conditions can be approximated as incompressible.

For low speed incompressible flows, the dynamic pressure is the difference between the stagnation pressure and the static pressure. The dynamic pressure is then determined using a diaphragm inside an enclosed container. If the air on one side of the diaphragm is at the static pressure, and the other is at the stagnation pressure, then the deflection of the diaphragm is proportional to the dynamic pressure.

In aircraft, the static pressure can be measured using static ports on the side of the fuselage. The dynamic pressure measured can be used to determine the indicated airspeed of the aircraft. The diaphragm arrangement described above can be contained within the airspeed indicator, which can convert the dynamic pressure to an airspeed reading by means of mechanical levers.

Instead of separate pitot and static ports, a pitot-static tube (also called a Prandtl tube) may be employed, which has a second tube coaxial with the pitot tube with holes on the sides, outside the direct airflow, to measure the static pressure.

If a liquid column manometer is used to measure the pressure difference $\Delta p \equiv p_t - p_s$,

$$\Delta h = \frac{\Delta p}{\rho_l g}$$

where

- $\Delta h$ is the height difference of the columns;
- $\rho_l$ is the density of the liquid in the manometer;
- g is the standard acceleration due to gravity.

Therefore,

$$u = \sqrt{\frac{2 \, \Delta h \, \rho_l g}{\rho}}$$

== Aircraft and accidents ==
A pitot-static system is a system of pressure-sensitive instruments often used in aviation to determine an aircraft's airspeed, Mach number, altitude, and altitude trend. A pitot-static system generally consists of a pitot tube, a static port, and the pitot-static instruments. Errors in pitot-static system readings can be extremely dangerous, because the information obtained from the pitot static system, such as airspeed, is potentially safety-critical.

Several commercial airline incidents and accidents have been traced to a failure of the pitot-static system. Examples include Austral Líneas Aéreas Flight 2553, Northwest Airlines Flight 6231, Birgenair Flight 301, and one of the two X-31s. The French air safety authority BEA said that pitot tube icing was a contributing factor in the crash of Air France Flight 447 into the Atlantic Ocean. In 2008 Air Caraïbes reported two incidents of pitot tube icing malfunctions on its A330s.

Birgenair Flight 301 had a fatal pitot tube failure which investigators suspected was due to insects creating a nest inside the pitot tube; the prime suspect is a black and yellow mud dauber wasp (Sceliphron sp.).

Aeroperú Flight 603 had a fatal pitot-static system failure due to the cleaning crew leaving the static port blocked with tape.

== Other applications ==
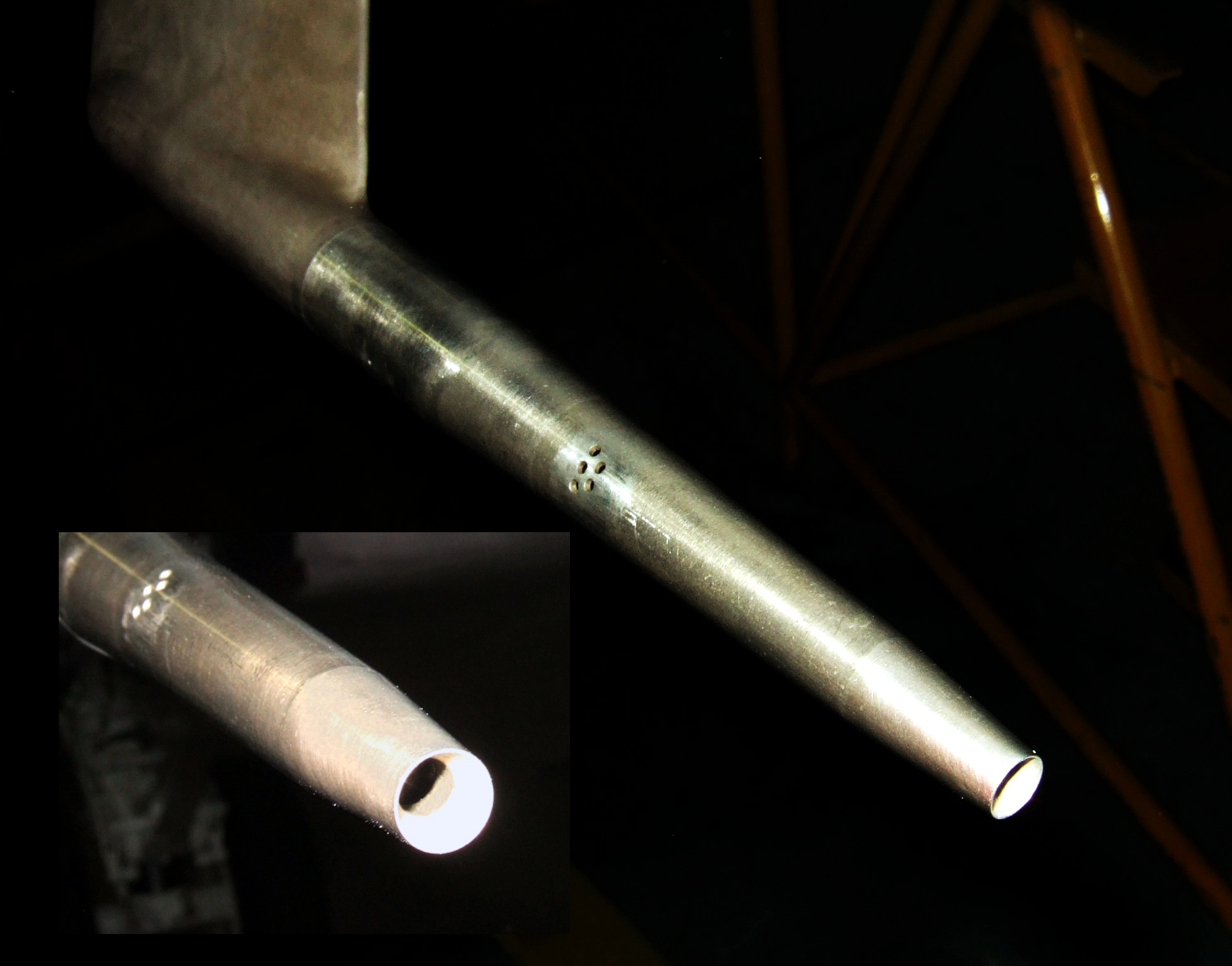
Pitot tube from an F/A-18

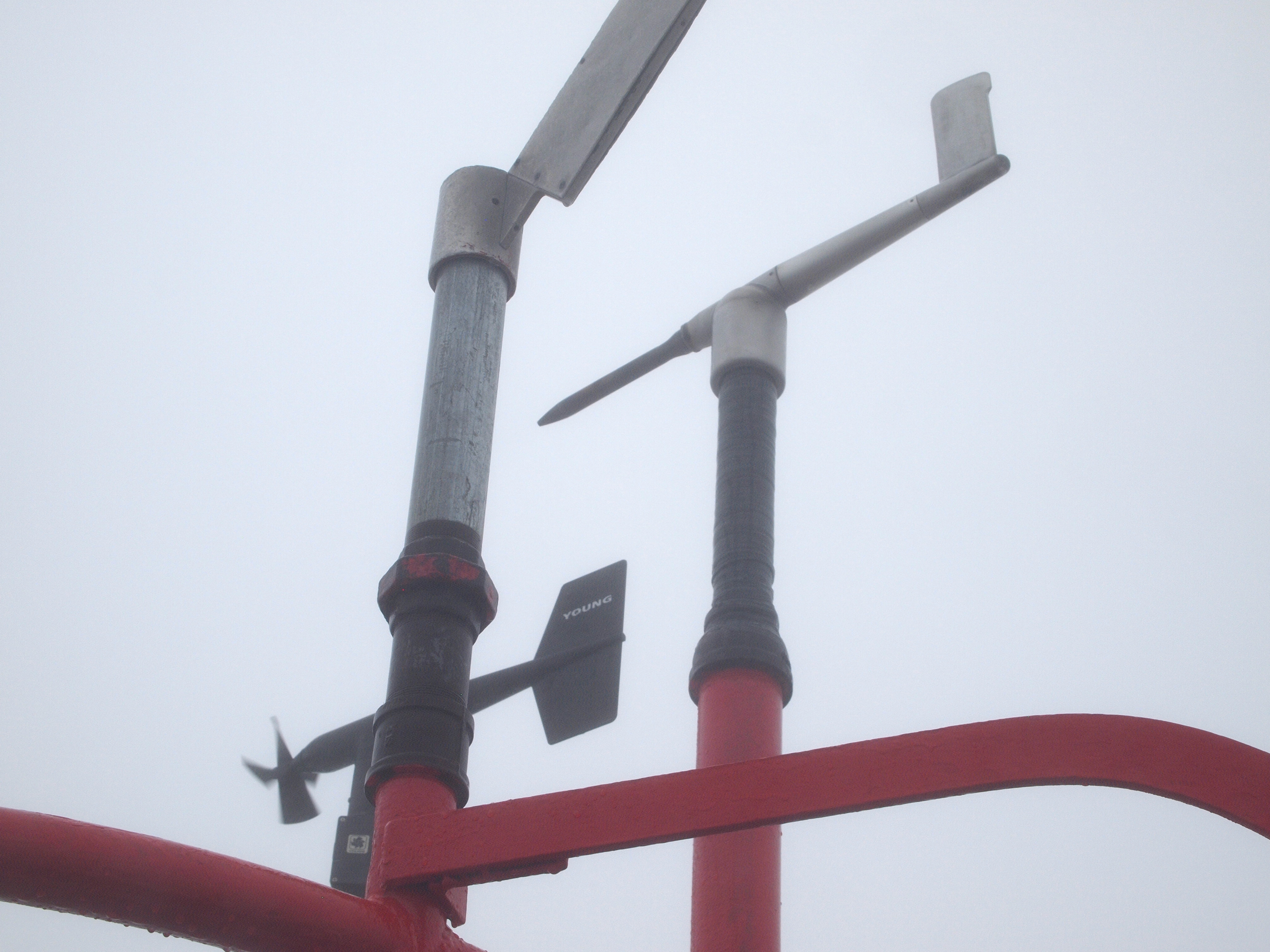
Weather instruments at Mount Washington Observatory. Pitot tube static anemometer is on the right.

In industry, the flow velocities being measured are often those flowing in ducts and tubing where measurements by an anemometer would be difficult to obtain. In these kinds of measurements, the most practical instrument to use is the pitot tube. The pitot tube can be inserted through a small hole in the duct with the pitot connected to a U-tube water gauge or some other differential pressure gauge for determining the flow velocity inside the ducted wind tunnel. One use of this technique is to determine the volume of air that is being delivered to a conditioned space.

The fluid flow rate in a duct can then be estimated from:

Volume flow rate (cubic feet per minute) = duct area (square feet) × flow velocity (feet per minute)
Volume flow rate (cubic meters per second) = duct area (square meters) × flow velocity (meters per second)

In aviation, airspeed is typically measured in knots.

In weather stations with high wind speeds, the pitot tube is modified to create a special type of anemometer called pitot tube static anemometer.

In many modern carburetors, a pitot tube at the intake is fed to the fuel float chamber as an alternative to feeding ambient air pressure or intake static pressure there to better control air/fuel ratio.

== See also ==
- Air data boom
- Altimeter
- Annubar
- Calibrated airspeed
- Deicing
- Gyrocompass
- Kiel probe
- Piezometer
- Position error
- True airspeed

== Bibliography ==
- Kermode, A.C. (1996) [1972]. Mechanics of Flight. Barnard, R.H. (Ed.) and Philpott, D.R. (Ed.) (10th ed.). Prentice Hall. pp. 63–67. ISBN 0-582-23740-8.
- Pratt, Jeremy M. (2005) [1997]. The Private Pilot's Licence Course: Principles of Flight, Aircraft General Knowledge, Flight Performance and Planning (3rd ed.). Airplan Flight Equipment. gen108–gen111. ISBN 1-874783-23-3.
- Tietjens, O.G. (1934). Applied Hydro- and Aeromechanics, based on lectures of L. Prandtl, Ph.D. Dove Publications, Inc. pp. 226–239. ISBN 0-486-60375-X.
- Saleh, J.M. (2002). Fluid Flow Handbook. McGraw-Hill Professional.
