= Maneuvering speed =

Airspeed limitation selected by the designer of the aircraft

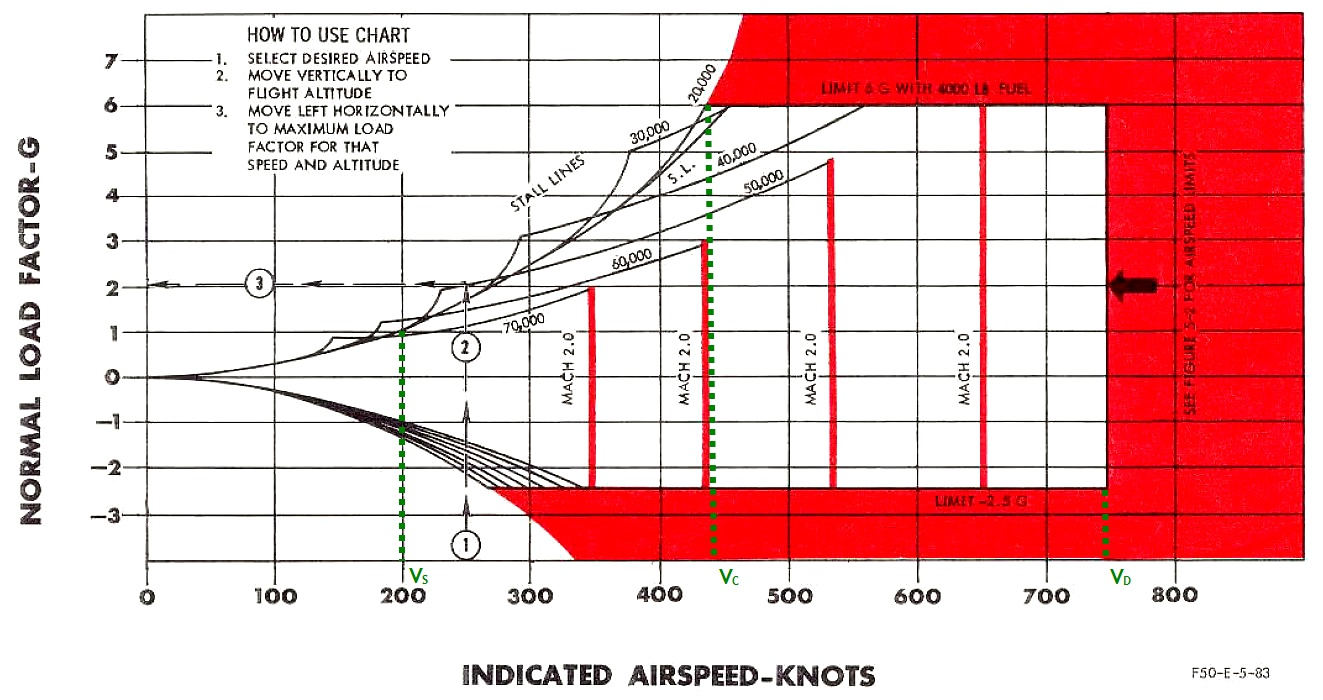
A flight envelope diagram showing V_{S} (Stall speed at 1G), V_{C} (Corner/Maneuvering speed) and V_{D} (Dive speed)

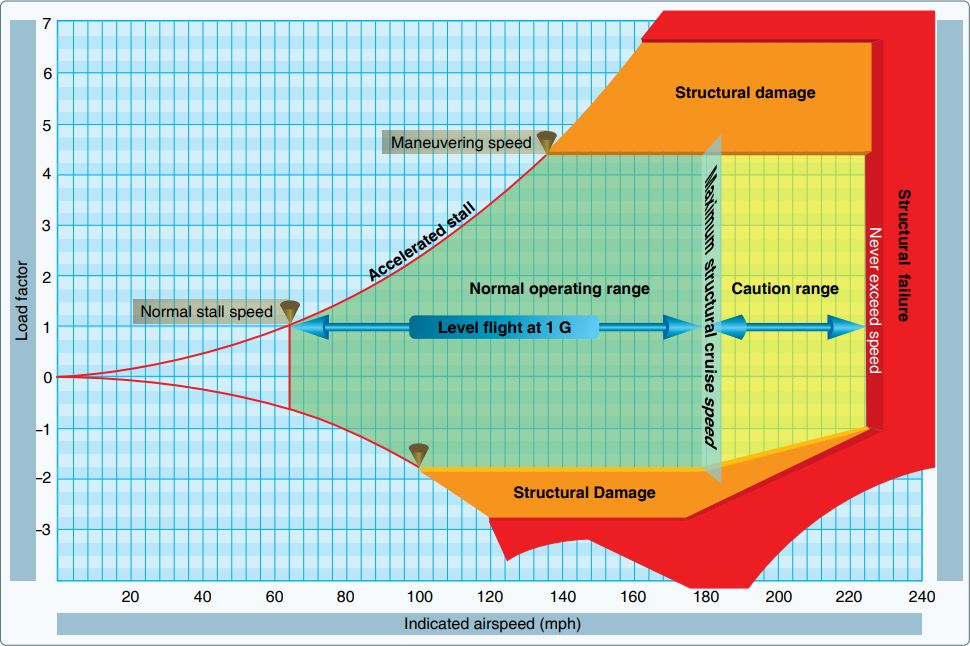
Vg diagram. Note the 1g stall speed, and the Maneuvering Speed (Corner Speed) for both positive and negative g. The maximum “never-exceed” placard dive speeds are determined for smooth air only.

In aviation, the maneuvering speed of an aircraft is an airspeed limitation at which the full deflection of the controls can be made at without risking structural damage.

The maneuvering speed of an aircraft is shown on a cockpit placard and in the aircraft's flight manual but is not commonly shown on the aircraft's airspeed indicator.

In the context of air combat maneuvering (ACM), the maneuvering speed is also known as corner speed or cornering speed.

== Implications ==
It has been widely misunderstood that flight below maneuvering speed will provide total protection from structural failure. In response to the destruction of American Airlines Flight 587, a CFR Final Rule was issued clarifying that "flying at or below the design maneuvering speed does not allow a pilot to make multiple large control inputs in one airplane axis or single full control inputs in more than one airplane axis at a time". Such actions "may result in structural failures at any speed, including below the maneuvering speed."

== Design maneuvering speed V_{A} ==
V_{A} is the design maneuvering speed and is a calibrated airspeed. Maneuvering speed cannot be slower than $V_s \sqrt{n}$ and need not be greater than V_{c}.

If $V_A$ is chosen by the manufacturer to be exactly $V_s \sqrt{n}$ the aircraft will stall in a nose-up pitching maneuver before the structure is subjected to its limiting aerodynamic load. However, if $V_A$ is selected to be greater than $V_s \sqrt{n}$, the structure will be subjected to loads which exceed the limiting load unless the pilot checks the maneuver.

The maneuvering speed or maximum operating maneuvering speed depicted on a cockpit placard is calculated for the maximum weight of the aircraft. Some Pilot's Operating Handbooks also present safe speeds for weights less than the maximum.

The formula used to calculate a safe speed for a lower weight is $\scriptstyle V_A \sqrt{W_2 \over W_1}$, where V_{A} is maneuvering speed (at maximum weight), W_{2} is actual weight, W_{1} is maximum weight.

== Maximum operating maneuvering speed V_{O} ==
Some aircraft have a maximum operating maneuvering speed V_{O}. Note that this is a different concept than design maneuvering speed. The concept of maximum operating maneuvering speed was introduced to the US type-certification standards for light aircraft in 1993. The maximum operating maneuvering speed is selected by the aircraft designer and cannot be more than $V_s \sqrt{n}$, where V_{s} is the stalling speed of the aircraft, and n is the maximal allowed positive load factor.

== See also ==
- V speeds
- American Airlines Flight 587
