= Annubar =

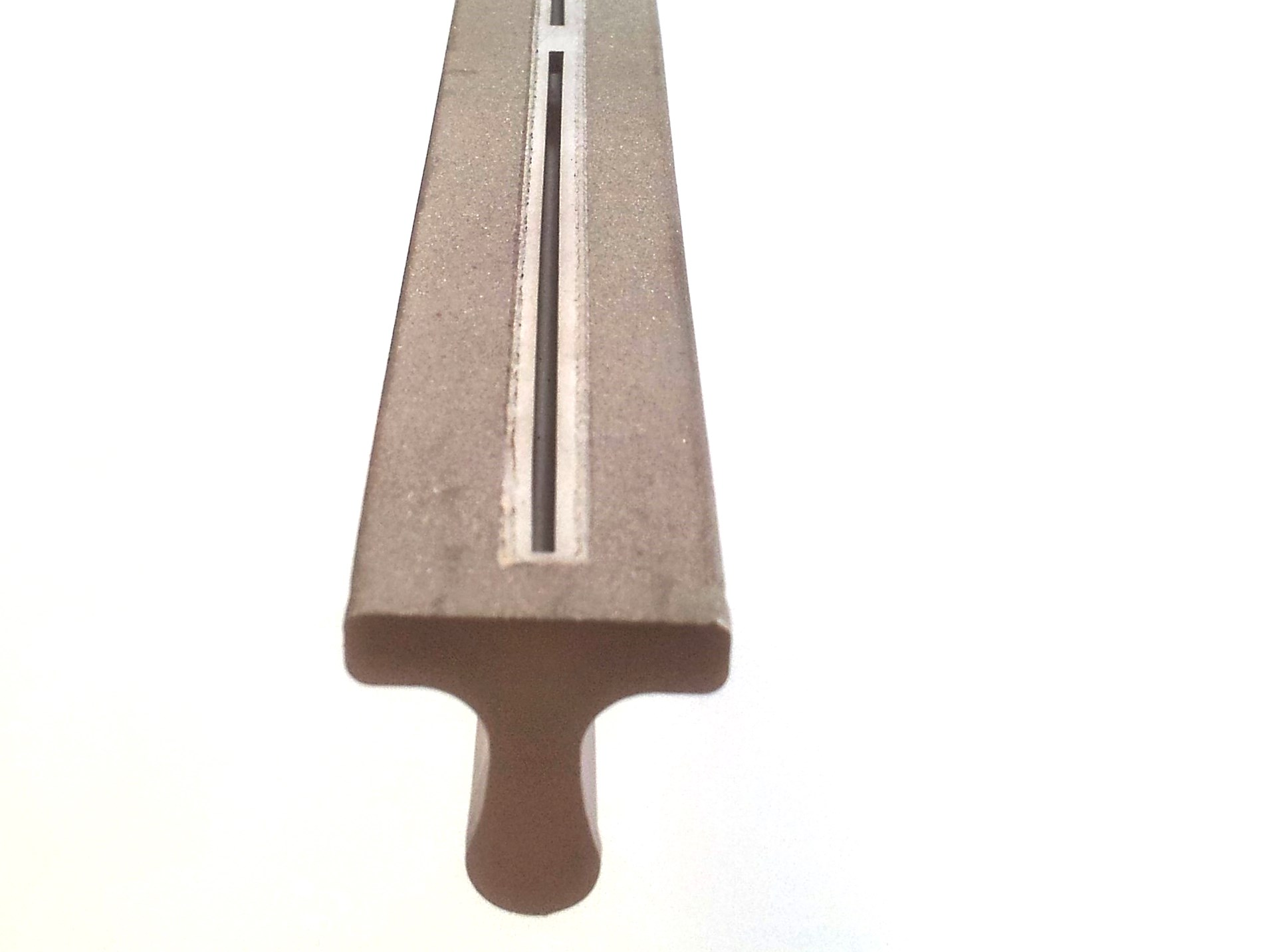
Profile view of upstream slots

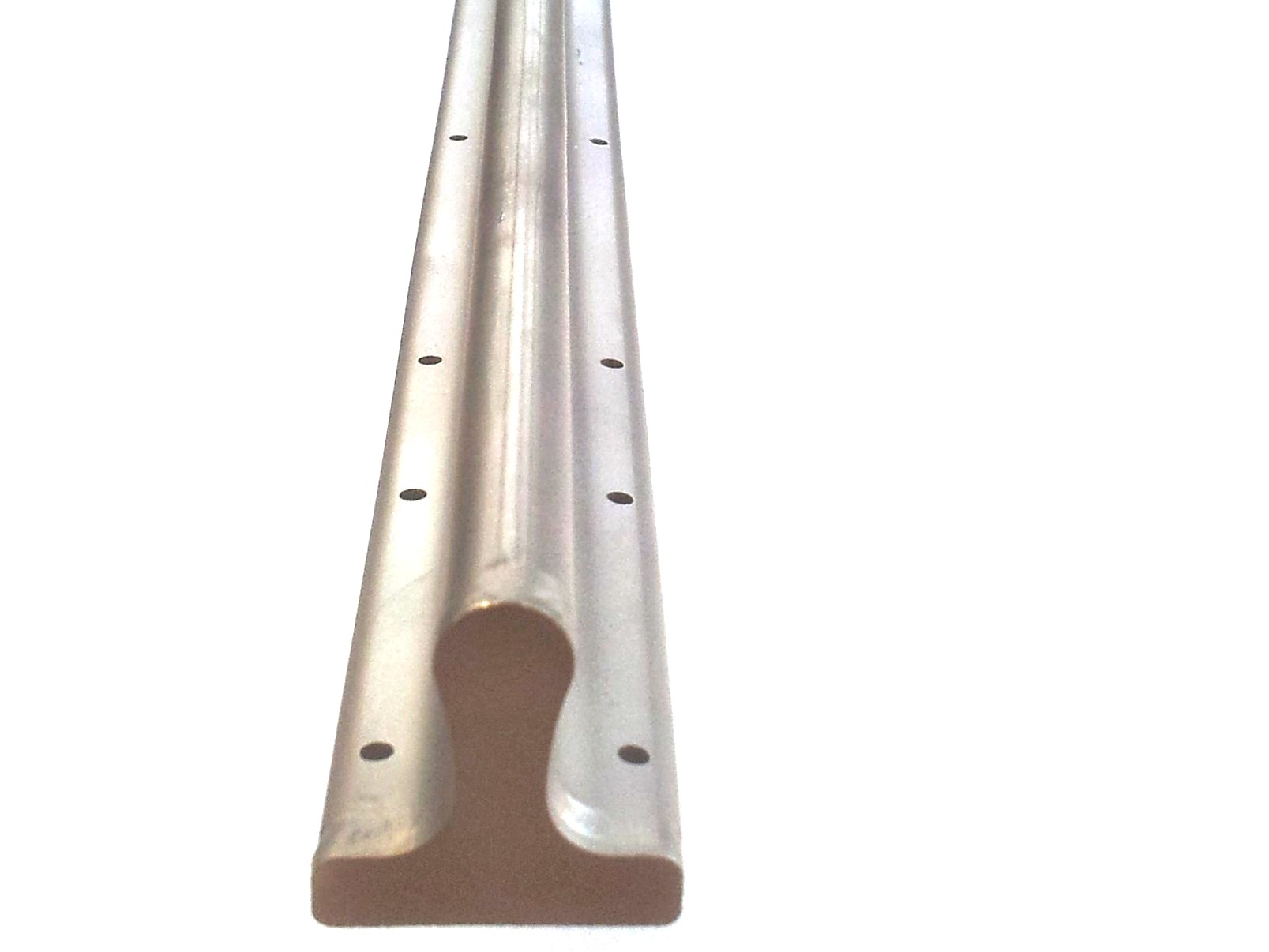
Profile view of downstream averaging holes

The Annubar primary element is an averaging Pitot tube manufactured by Rosemount Inc. used to measure the flow of fluid in a pipe.

A Pitot tube measures the difference between the static pressure and the flowing pressure of the media in the pipe. The volumetric flow is calculated from that difference using Bernoulli's principle, taking into account the pipe's inside diameter. An Annubar, as an averaging Pitot tube, takes multiple samples across a section of a pipe or duct, averaging the differential pressures encountered accounting for variations in flow across the section.
