= Calibrated airspeed =

Airspeed corrected for instrument and position error

In aviation, calibrated airspeed (CAS) is indicated airspeed corrected for instrument and position error.

When flying at sea level under International Standard Atmosphere conditions (15 °C, 1013 hPa, 0% humidity) calibrated airspeed is the same as equivalent airspeed (EAS) and true airspeed (TAS). If there is no wind it is also the same as ground speed (GS). Under any other conditions, CAS may differ from the aircraft's TAS and GS.

Calibrated airspeed in knots is usually abbreviated as KCAS, while indicated airspeed is abbreviated as KIAS.

In some applications, notably British usage, the expression rectified airspeed is used instead of calibrated airspeed.

== Practical applications of CAS ==
CAS has two primary applications in aviation:

- for navigation, CAS is traditionally calculated as one of the steps between indicated airspeed and true airspeed;
- for aircraft control, CAS (and EAS) are the primary reference points, since they describe the dynamic pressure acting on aircraft surfaces regardless of density, altitude, wind, and other conditions. EAS is used as a reference by aircraft designers, but EAS cannot be displayed correctly at varying altitudes by a simple (single capsule) airspeed indicator. CAS is therefore a standard for calibrating the airspeed indicator such that CAS equals EAS at sea level pressure and approximates EAS at higher altitudes.

With the widespread use of GPS and other advanced navigation systems in cockpits, the first application is rapidly decreasing in importance – pilots are able to read groundspeed (and often true airspeed) directly, without calculating calibrated airspeed as an intermediate step. The second application remains critical, however – for example, at the same weight, an aircraft will rotate and climb at approximately the same calibrated airspeed at any elevation, even though the true airspeed and groundspeed may differ significantly. These V speeds are usually given as IAS rather than CAS, so that a pilot can read them directly from the airspeed indicator.

== Calculation from impact pressure ==
Since the airspeed indicator capsule responds to impact pressure, CAS is defined as a function of impact pressure alone. Static pressure and temperature appear as fixed coefficients defined by convention as standard sea level values. It so happens that the speed of sound is a direct function of temperature, so instead of a standard temperature, we can define a standard speed of sound.

For subsonic speeds, CAS is calculated as:

$CAS=a_{0}\sqrt{5\left[\left(\frac{q_c}{P_{0}}+1\right)^\frac{2}{7}-1\right]}$

where:

- $q_c$ = impact pressure
- $P_{0}$ = standard pressure at sea level
- ${a_{0}}$ is the standard speed of sound at 15 °C

For supersonic airspeeds, where a normal shock forms in front of the pitot probe, the Rayleigh formula applies:

$CAS=a_{0}\left[\left(\frac{q_c}{P_{0}}+1\right)\times\left(7\left(\frac{CAS}{a_{0}}\right)^2-1\right)^{2.5} / \left(6^{2.5} \times 1.2^{3.5} \right) \right]^{(1/7)}$

The supersonic formula must be solved iteratively, by assuming an initial value for $CAS$ equal to $a_{0}$.

These formulae work in any units provided the appropriate values for $P_{0}$ and $a_{0}$ are selected. For example, $P_{0}$ = 1013.25 hPa, $a_{0}$ = 1,225 km/h (661.45 kn). The ratio of specific heats for air is assumed to be 1.4.

These formulae can then be used to calibrate an airspeed indicator when impact pressure ($q_c$) is measured using a water manometer or accurate pressure gauge. If using a water manometer to measure millimeters of water the reference pressure ($P_{0}$) may be entered as 10333 mm $H_2O$.

At higher altitudes CAS can be corrected for compressibility error to give equivalent airspeed (EAS). In practice compressibility error is negligible below about 3,000 m (10,000 ft) and 370 km/h (200 kn).

== See also ==
- Acronyms and abbreviations in avionics
- ICAO recommendations on use of the International System of Units
- Equivalent airspeed
- Flight instruments
- Indicated airspeed
- True airspeed

== Bibliography ==
- Blake, Walt (2009). Jet Transport Performance Methods. Seattle: Boeing Commercial Airplanes.
- Gracey, William (1980), "Measurement of Aircraft Speed and Altitude" (12 MB), p. 15, NASA Reference Publication 1046.
