= Impact pressure =

Difference between total and static pressure

In compressible fluid dynamics, impact pressure (dynamic pressure) is the difference between total pressure (also known as pitot pressure or stagnation pressure) and static pressure. In aerodynamics notation, this quantity is denoted as $q_c$ or $Q_c$.

When input to an airspeed indicator, impact pressure is used to provide a calibrated airspeed reading. An air data computer with inputs of pitot and static pressures is able to provide a Mach number and, if static temperature is known, true airspeed.

Some authors in the field of compressible flows use the term dynamic pressure or compressible dynamic pressure instead of impact pressure.

== Isentropic flow ==
In isentropic flow the ratio of total pressure to static pressure is given by:

$\frac{P_t}{P} = \left(1+ \frac{\gamma -1}{2} M^2 \right)^\tfrac{\gamma}{\gamma - 1}$

where:

$P_t$ is total pressure

$P$ is static pressure

$\gamma\;$ is the ratio of specific heats

$M\;$ is the freestream Mach number

Taking $\gamma\;$ to be 1.4, and since $\;P_t=P+q_c$

$\;q_c = P\left[\left(1+0.2 M^2 \right)^\tfrac{7}{2}-1\right]$

Expressing the incompressible dynamic pressure as $\;\tfrac{1}{2}\gamma PM^2$ and expanding by the binomial series gives:

$\;q_c=q \left(1 + \frac{M^2}{4} + \frac{M^4}{40} + \frac{M^6}{1600} ... \right)\;$

where:

$\;q$ is dynamic pressure

== See also ==
- Dynamic pressure
- Pitot-static system
- Pressure
- Static pressure
