= Pitot–static system =

Aviation instruments

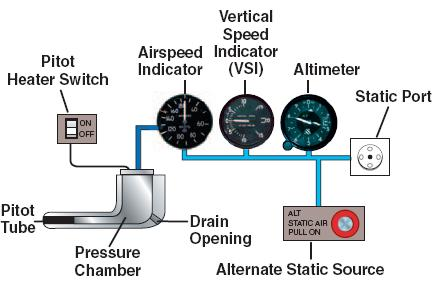
Diagram of a pitot–static system including the pitot tube, pitot–static instruments and static port

A pitot–static system is a system of pressure-sensitive instruments that is most often used in aviation to determine an aircraft's airspeed, Mach number, altitude, and altitude trend. A pitot–static system generally consists of a pitot tube, a static port, and the pitot–static instruments. Other instruments that might be connected are air data computers, flight data recorders, altitude encoders, cabin pressurization controllers, and various airspeed switches. Errors in pitot–static system readings can be extremely dangerous as the information obtained from the pitot static system, such as altitude, is potentially safety-critical. Several commercial airline disasters have been traced to a failure of the pitot–static system.

The Code of Federal Regulations (CFRs) require pitot–static systems installed in US-registered aircraft to be tested and inspected every 24 calendar months.

== Pitot–static pressure ==
Examples of pitot tube, static tube, and pitot–static tube

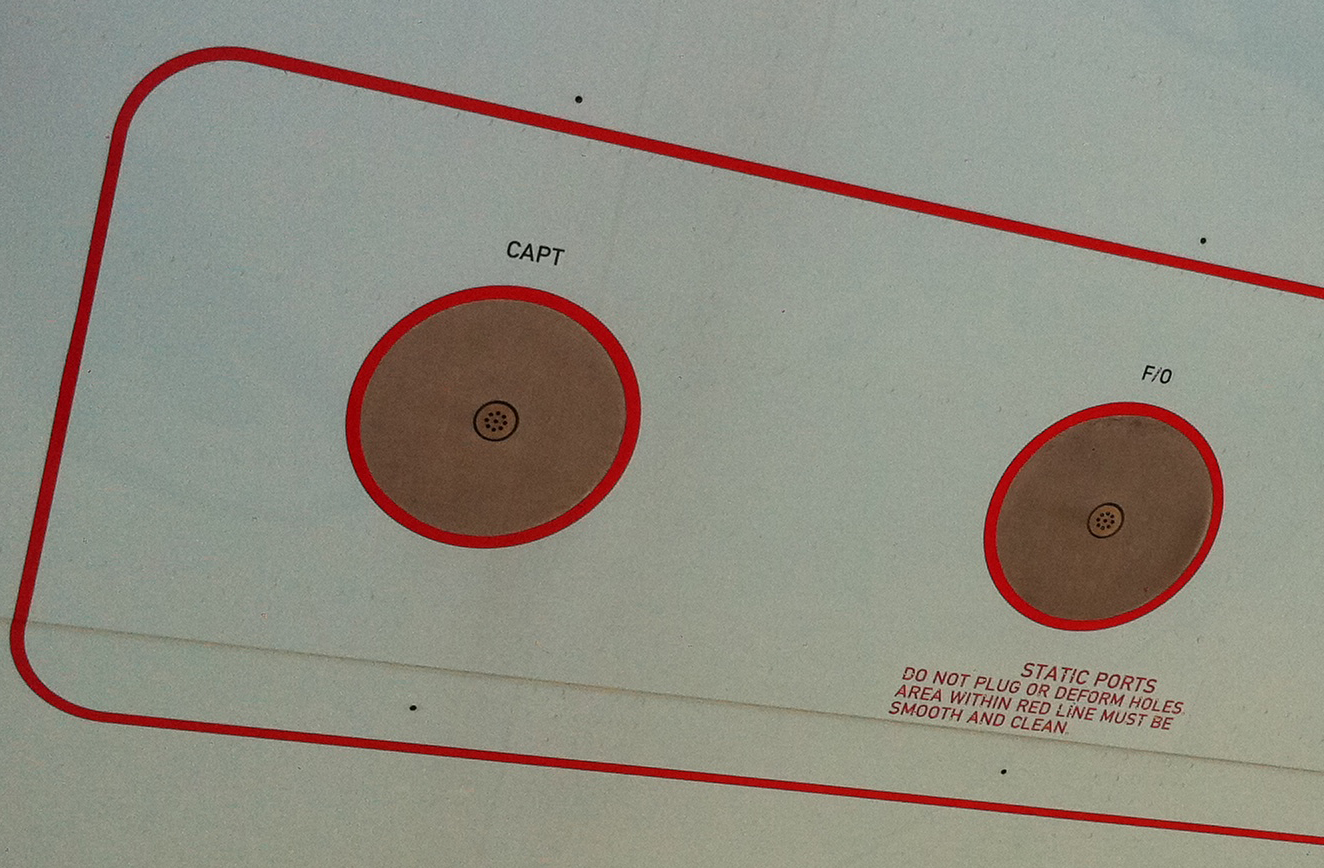
Static ports fitted to an Airbus A330 passenger airliner

The pitot–static system of instruments uses the principle of air pressure gradient. It works by measuring pressures or pressure differences and using these values to assess the speed and altitude. These pressures can be measured either from the static port (static pressure) or the pitot tube (pitot pressure). The static pressure is used in all measurements, while the pitot pressure is used only to determine airspeed.

=== Pitot pressure ===
The pitot pressure is obtained from the pitot tube. The pitot pressure is a measure of ram air pressure (the air pressure created by vehicle motion or the air ramming into the tube), which, under ideal conditions, is equal to stagnation pressure, also called total pressure. The pitot tube is most often located on the wing or front section of an aircraft, facing forward, where its opening is exposed to the relative wind. By situating the pitot tube in such a location, the ram air pressure is more accurately measured since it will be less distorted by the aircraft's structure. When airspeed increases, the ram air pressure is increased, which can be translated by the airspeed indicator.

=== Static pressure ===
The static pressure is obtained through a static port. The static port is most often a flush-mounted hole on the fuselage of an aircraft, and is located where it can access the air flow in a relatively undisturbed area. Some aircraft may have a single static port, while others may have more than one. In situations where an aircraft has more than one static port, there is usually one located on each side of the fuselage. With this positioning, an average pressure can be taken, which allows for more accurate readings in specific flight situations. An alternative static port may be located inside the cabin of the aircraft as a backup for when the external static port(s) are blocked. A pitot–static tube effectively integrates the static ports into the pitot probe. It incorporates a second coaxial tube (or tubes) with pressure-sampling holes on the sides of the probe, outside the direct airflow, to measure the static pressure. When the aircraft climbs, static pressure will decrease.

=== Multiple pressure ===
Some pitot–static systems incorporate single probes that contain multiple pressure-transmitting ports that allow for the sensing of air pressure, angle of attack, and angle of sideslip data. Depending on the design, such air data probes may be referred to as 5-hole or 7-hole air data probes. Differential pressure sensing techniques can be used to produce angle of attack and angle of sideslip indications.

== Pitot–static instrument ==
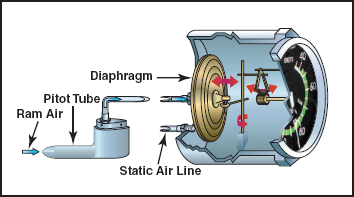
Airspeed indicator diagram showing pressure sources from both the pitot tube and the static port

The pitot–static system obtains pressures for interpretation by the pitot–static instruments. While the explanations below explain traditional, mechanical instruments, many modern aircraft use an air data computer (ADC) to calculate airspeed, rate of climb, altitude and Mach number. In some aircraft, two ADCs receive total and static pressure from independent pitot tubes and static ports, and the aircraft's flight data computer compares the information from both computers and checks one against the other. There are also "standby instruments", which are back-up pneumatic instruments employed in the case of problems with the primary instruments.

=== Airspeed indicator ===
The airspeed indicator is connected to both the pitot and static pressure sources. The difference between the pitot pressure and the static pressure is called dynamic pressure. The greater the dynamic pressure, the higher the airspeed reported. A traditional mechanical airspeed indicator contains a pressure diaphragm that is connected to the pitot tube. The case around the diaphragm is airtight and is vented to the static port. The higher the speed, the higher the ram pressure, the more pressure exerted on the diaphragm, and the larger the needle movement through the mechanical linkage.

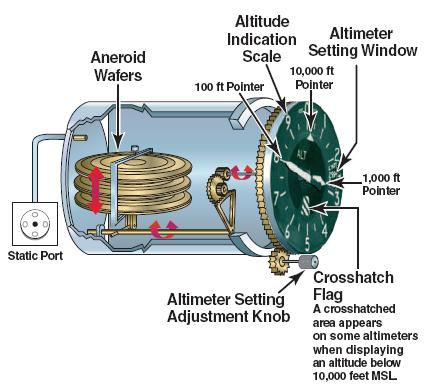
Aneroid wafer of an altimeter

=== Altimeter ===
The pressure altimeter, also known as the barometric altimeter, is used to determine changes in air pressure that occur as the aircraft's altitude changes. Pressure altimeters must be calibrated prior to flight to register the pressure as an altitude above sea level. The instrument case of the altimeter is airtight and has a vent to the static port. Inside the instrument, there is a sealed aneroid barometer. As pressure in the case decreases, the internal barometer expands, which is mechanically translated into a determination of altitude. The reverse is true when descending from higher to lower altitudes.

=== Machmeter ===
Aircraft designed to operate at transonic or supersonic speeds will incorporate a machmeter. The machmeter is used to show the ratio of true airspeed in relation to the speed of sound. Most supersonic aircraft are limited as to the maximum Mach number they can fly, which is known as the "Mach limit". The Mach number is displayed on a machmeter as a decimal fraction.

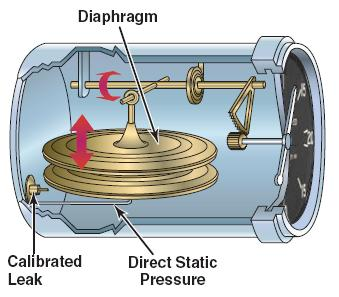
A vertical speed indicator

=== Vertical speed indicator ===
The variometer, also known as the vertical speed indicator (VSI) or the vertical velocity indicator (VVI), is the pitot–static instrument used to determine whether or not an aircraft is flying in level flight. The vertical speed specifically shows the rate of climb or the rate of descent, which is measured in feet per minute or meters per second. The vertical speed is measured through a mechanical linkage to a diaphragm located within the instrument. The area surrounding the diaphragm is vented to the static port through a calibrated leak (which also may be known as a "restricted diffuser"). When the aircraft begins to increase altitude, the diaphragm will begin to contract at a rate faster than that of the calibrated leak, causing the needle to show a positive vertical speed. The reverse of this situation is true when an aircraft is descending. The calibrated leak varies from model to model, but the average time for the diaphragm to equalize pressure is between 6 and 9 seconds.

== Pitot–static errors ==
There are several situations that can affect the accuracy of the pitot–static instruments. Some of these involve failures of the pitot–static system itself—which may be classified as "system malfunctions"—while others are the result of faulty instrument placement or other environmental factors—which may be classified as "inherent errors".

=== System malfunctions ===
==== Blocked pitot tube ====
A blocked pitot tube is a pitot–static problem that will only affect airspeed indicators. A blocked pitot tube will cause the airspeed indicator to register an increase in airspeed when the aircraft climbs, even though actual airspeed is constant. (As long as the drain hole is also blocked, as the air pressure would otherwise leak out to the atmosphere.) This is caused by the pressure in the pitot system remaining constant when the atmospheric pressure (and static pressure) are decreasing. Conversely, the airspeed indicator will show a decrease in airspeed when the aircraft descends. The pitot tube is susceptible to becoming clogged by ice, water, insects or some other obstruction. For this reason, aviation regulatory agencies such as the U.S. Federal Aviation Administration (FAA) recommend that the pitot tube be checked for obstructions prior to any flight. To prevent icing, many pitot tubes are equipped with a heating element. A heated pitot tube is required in all aircraft certificated for instrument flight except aircraft certificated as Experimental Amateur-Built.

==== Blocked static port ====
A blocked static port is a more serious situation because it affects all pitot–static instruments. One of the most common causes of a blocked static port is airframe icing. A blocked static port will cause the altimeter to freeze at a constant value, the altitude at which the static port became blocked. The vertical speed indicator will read zero and will not change at all, even if vertical speed increases or decreases. The airspeed indicator will reverse the error that occurs with a clogged pitot tube and cause the airspeed to be read less than it actually is as the aircraft climbs. When the aircraft is descending, the airspeed will be over-reported. In most aircraft with unpressurized cabins, an alternative static source is available and can be selected from within the cockpit.

=== Inherent errors ===
Inherent errors may fall into several categories, each affecting different instruments. Density errors affect instruments metering airspeed and altitude. This type of error is caused by variations of pressure and temperature in the atmosphere. A compressibility error can arise because the impact pressure will cause the air to compress in the pitot tube. At standard sea level pressure altitude the calibration equation (see calibrated airspeed) correctly accounts for the compression so there is no compressibility error at sea level. At higher altitudes the compression is not correctly accounted for and will cause the instrument to read greater than equivalent airspeed. A correction may be obtained from a chart. Compressibility error becomes significant at altitudes above 10,000 feet (3,000 m) and at airspeeds greater than 200 knots (370 km/h). Hysteresis is an error that is caused by mechanical properties of the aneroid capsules located within the instruments. These capsules, used to determine pressure differences, have physical properties that resist change by retaining a given shape, even though the external forces may have changed. Reversal errors are caused by a false static pressure reading. This false reading may be caused by abnormally large changes in an aircraft's pitch. A large change in pitch will cause a momentary showing of movement in the opposite direction. Reversal errors primarily affect altimeters and vertical speed indicators.

==== Position errors ====
Another class of inherent errors is that of position error. A position error is produced by the aircraft's static pressure being different from the air pressure remote from the aircraft. This error is caused by the air flowing past the static port at a speed different from the aircraft's true airspeed. Position errors may provide positive or negative errors, depending on one of several factors. These factors include airspeed, angle of attack, aircraft weight, acceleration, aircraft configuration, and in the case of helicopters, rotor downwash. There are two categories of position errors, which are "fixed errors" and "variable errors". Fixed errors are defined as errors which are specific to a particular model of aircraft. Variable errors are caused by external factors such as deformed panels obstructing the flow of air, or particular situations which may overstress the aircraft.

==== Lag errors ====
Lag errors are caused by the fact that any changes in the static or dynamic pressure outside the aircraft require a finite amount of time to make their way down the tubing and affect the gauges. This type of error depends on the length and diameter of the tubing as well as the volume inside the gauges. Lag error is only significant around the time when the airspeed or altitude are changing. It is not a concern for steady level flight.

== Pitot–static–related disasters ==
- 1 December 1974 – Northwest Airlines Flight 6231, a Boeing 727, crashed northwest of John F. Kennedy International Airport during climb en route to Buffalo Niagara International Airport because of blockage of the pitot tubes by atmospheric icing.
- 6 February 1996 – Birgenair Flight 301 crashed into the sea shortly after takeoff due to incorrect readings from the airspeed indicator. The suspected cause was a blocked pitot tube (this was never confirmed, as the airplane wreck was not recovered).
- 2 October 1996 – Aeroperú Flight 603 crashed because of blockage of the static ports. The static ports on the left side of the aircraft had been taped over while the aircraft was being waxed and cleaned. After the job was done, the tape was not removed.
- February 23, 2008 – A B-2 bomber took off from Andersen Air Force Base in Guam and subsequently crashed after stalling. It was caused by moisture on the air-speed sensors.
- 1 June 2009 – The French air safety authority BEA said that pitot tube icing was a contributing factor in the crash of Air France Flight 447.
- 11 February 2018 – Saratov Airlines Flight 703 crashed shortly after taking off from Moscow Domodedovo Airport. The reported reason was the crew's confusion caused by conflicting airspeed values due to ice-blocked pitot tubes.

== See also ==
- Index of aviation articles
- Air data boom
- Air data inertial reference unit
- Austral Líneas Aéreas Flight 2553
- Position error
