= Flight instruments =

Aircraft instrument that gives information during flight

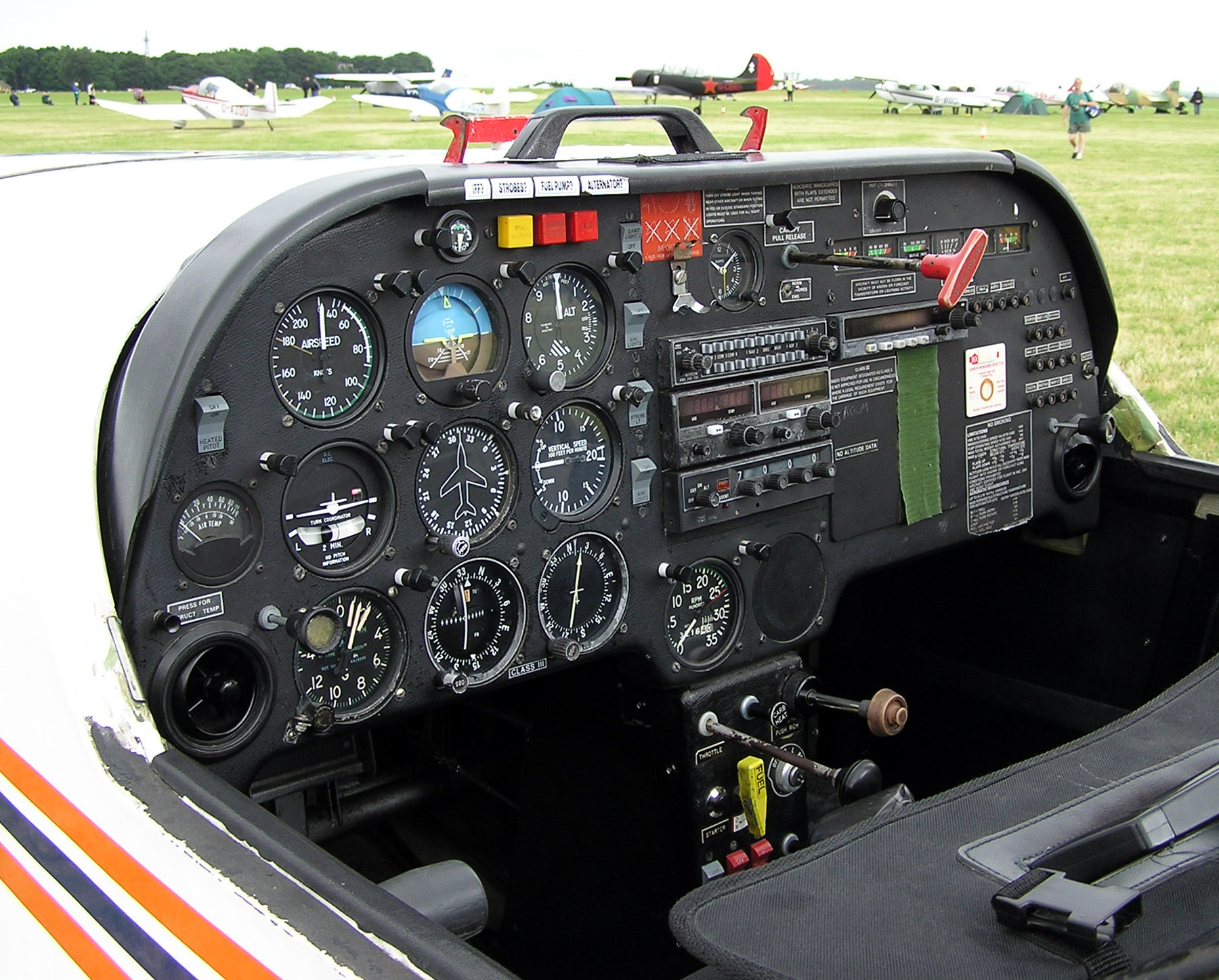
The cockpit of a Slingsby T-67 Firefly two-seat light airplane. The flight instruments are visible on the left of the instrument panel

Flight instruments are the instruments in the cockpit of an aircraft that provide the pilot with data about the flight situation of that aircraft, such as altitude, airspeed, vertical speed, heading and much more other crucial information in flight. They improve safety by allowing the pilot to fly the aircraft in level flight, and make turns, without a reference outside the aircraft such as the horizon. Visual flight rules (VFR) require an airspeed indicator, an altimeter, and a compass or other suitable magnetic direction indicator. Instrument flight rules (IFR) additionally require a gyroscopic pitch-bank (artificial horizon), direction (directional gyro) and rate of turn indicator, plus a slip-skid indicator, adjustable altimeter, and a clock. Flight into instrument meteorological conditions (IMC) require radio navigation instruments for precise takeoffs and landings.

The term is sometimes used loosely as a synonym for cockpit instruments as a whole, in which context it can include engine instruments, navigational and communication equipment. Many modern aircraft have electronic flight instrument systems.

Most regulated aircraft have these flight instruments as dictated by the US Code of Federal Regulations, Title 14, Part 91. They are grouped according to pitot-static system, compass systems, and gyroscopic instruments.

== Pitot-static systems ==
Instruments which are pitot-static systems use air pressure differences to determine speed and altitude.

=== Altimeter ===

The altimeter shows the aircraft's altitude above sea-level by measuring the difference between the pressure in a stack of aneroid capsules inside the altimeter and the atmospheric pressure obtained through the static system. The most common unit for altimeter calibration worldwide is hectopascals (hPa), except for North America and Japan where inches of mercury (inHg) are used. The altimeter is adjustable for local barometric pressure which must be set correctly to obtain accurate altitude readings, usually in either feet or meters. As the aircraft ascends, the capsules expand and the static pressure drops, causing the altimeter to indicate a higher altitude. The opposite effect occurs when descending. With the advancement in aviation and increased altitude ceiling, the altimeter dial had to be altered for use both at higher and lower altitudes. Hence when the needles were indicating lower altitudes i.e. the first 360-degree operation of the pointers was delineated by the appearance of a small window with oblique lines warning the pilot that he or she is nearer to the ground. This modification was introduced in the early sixties after the recurrence of air accidents caused by the confusion in the pilot's mind. At higher altitudes, the window will disappear.

=== Airspeed indicator ===

The airspeed indicator shows the aircraft's speed relative to the surrounding air. Knots is the currently most used unit, but kilometers per hour is sometimes used instead. The airspeed indicator works by measuring the ram-air pressure in the aircraft's pitot tube relative to the ambient static pressure. The indicated airspeed (IAS) must be corrected for nonstandard pressure and temperature in order to obtain the true airspeed (TAS). The instrument is color coded to indicate important airspeeds such as the stall speed, never-exceed airspeed, or safe flap operation speeds.

=== Vertical speed indicator ===
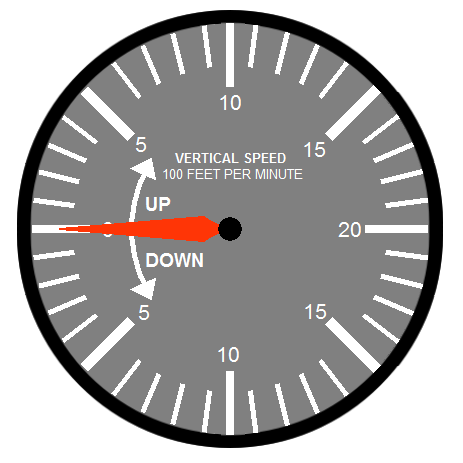

The VSI (also sometimes called a variometer, or rate of climb indicator) senses changing air pressure, and displays that information to the pilot as a rate of climb or descent in feet per minute, meters per second or knots.

== Compass systems ==
=== Magnetic compass ===
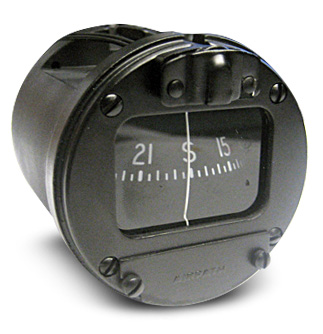

The compass shows the aircraft's heading relative to magnetic north. Errors include Variation, or the difference between magnetic and true direction, and Deviation, caused by the electrical wiring in the aircraft, which requires a Compass Correction Card. Additionally, the compass is subject to Dip Errors. While reliable in steady level flight it can give confusing indications when turning, climbing, descending, or accelerating due to the inclination of the Earth's magnetic field. For this reason, the heading indicator is also used for aircraft operation, but periodically calibrated against the compass.

== Gyroscopic systems ==
=== Attitude indicator ===

The attitude indicator (also known as an artificial horizon) shows the aircraft's relation to the horizon. From this the pilot can tell whether the wings are level (roll) and if the aircraft nose is pointing above or below the horizon (pitch). Attitude is always presented to users in the unit degrees (°). The attitude indicator is a primary instrument for instrument flight and is also useful in conditions of poor visibility. Pilots are trained to use other instruments in combination should this instrument or its power fail.

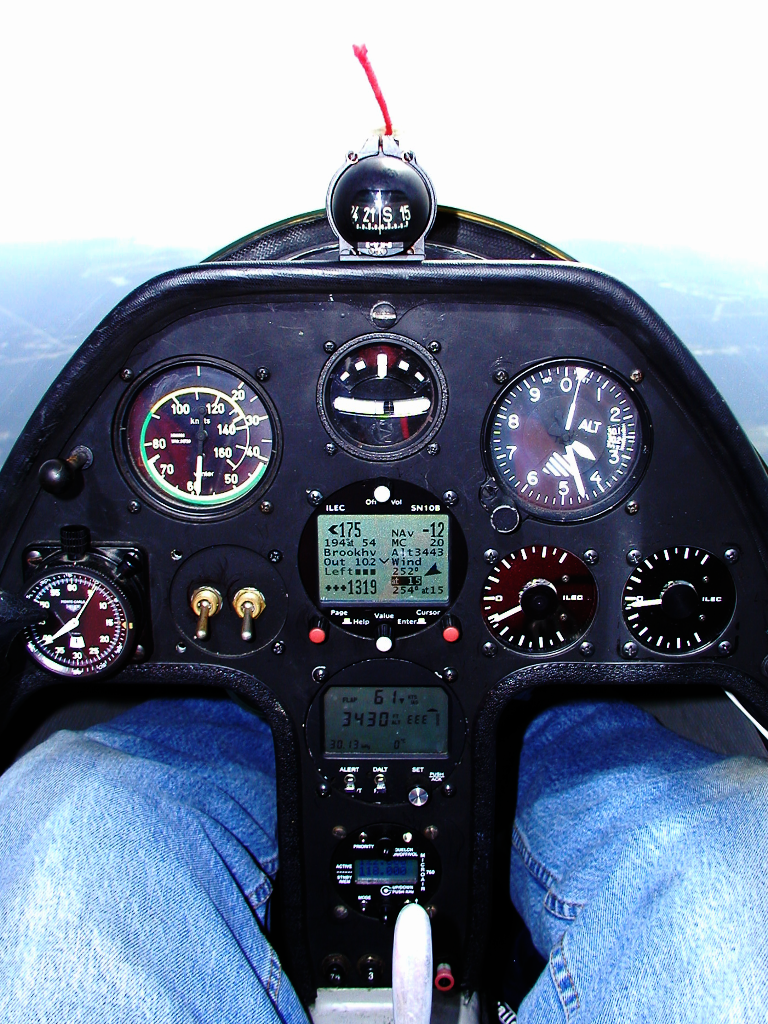
A Schempp-Hirth Janus C glider instrument panel equipped for "cloud flying". The turn and bank indicator is top centre. The heading indicator is replaced by a GPS-driven computer with wind and glide data, driving two electronic variometer displays to the right.

=== Heading indicator ===

The heading indicator (also known as the directional gyro, or DG) displays the aircraft's heading in compass points, and with respect to magnetic north when set with a compass. Bearing friction causes drift errors from precession, which must be periodically corrected by calibrating the instrument to the magnetic compass. In many advanced aircraft (including almost all jet aircraft), the heading indicator is replaced by a horizontal situation indicator (HSI) which provides the same heading information, but also assists with navigation.

=== Turn and slip indicator ===

These include the turn and slip indicator and the turn coordinator, which indicate rotation about the longitudinal axis. They include an inclinometer to indicate whether the aircraft is in coordinated flight, or in a slip or skid. Additional marks indicate a standard rate turn. The turn rate is most commonly expressed in either degrees per second (deg/s) or minutes per turn (min/tr).

== Flight director systems ==
These include the Horizontal Situation Indicator (HSI) and Attitude Director Indicator (ADI). The HSI combines the magnetic compass with navigation signals and a Glide slope. The navigation information comes from a VOR/Localizer, or GNSS. The ADI is an Attitude Indicator with computer-driven steering bars, a task reliever during instrument flight.

== Navigational systems ==
=== Very-high frequency omnidirectional range (VOR) ===
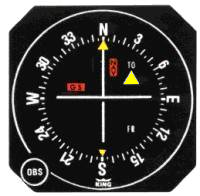

The VOR indicator instrument includes a course deviation indicator (CDI), omnibearing selector (OBS), TO/FROM indicator, and flags. The CDI shows an aircraft's lateral position in relation to a selected radial track. It is used for orientation, tracking to or from a station, and course interception. On the instrument, the vertical needle indicates the lateral position of the selected track. A horizontal needle allows the pilot to follow a glide slope when the instrument is used with an ILS.

=== Non-directional radio beacon (NDB) ===
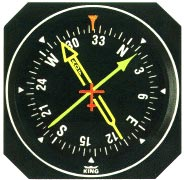

The automatic direction finder (ADF) indicator instrument can be a fixed-card, movable card, or a radio magnetic indicator (RMI). An RMI is remotely coupled to a gyrocompass so that it automatically rotates the azimuth card to represent aircraft heading. While simple ADF displays may have only one needle, a typical RMI has two, coupled to different ADF receivers, allowing for position fixing using one instrument.

== Layout ==
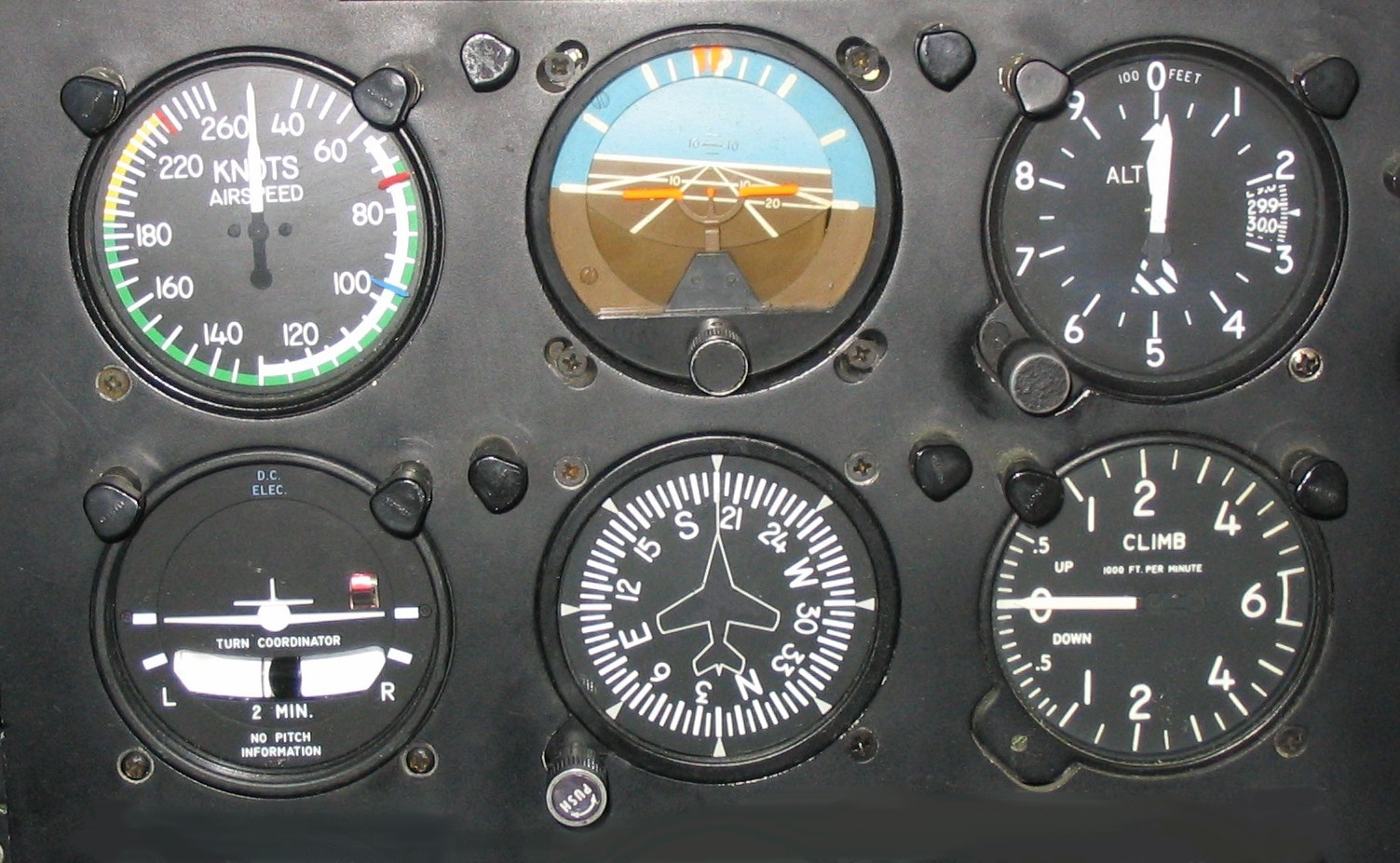
Six basic instruments in a light twin-engine airplane arranged in a "basic-T". From top left: airspeed indicator, attitude indicator, altimeter, turn coordinator, heading indicator, and vertical speed indicator

Most aircraft are equipped with a standard set of flight instruments which give the pilot information about the aircraft's attitude, airspeed, and altitude.

=== T arrangement ===
Most US aircraft built since the 1940s have flight instruments arranged in a standardized pattern called the T arrangement. The attitude indicator is in the top center, airspeed to the left, altimeter to the right and heading indicator under the attitude indicator. The magnetic compass will be directly below the attitude indicator, and above the instrument panel to limit electromagnetic interference. The placement of the various instruments were a recommendation of Howard Stark, who taught blind flying following his 1-2-3 method in the 1930s.

The other two, turn-coordinator and vertical-speed, are usually found under the airspeed and altimeter, but are given more latitude in placement. In newer aircraft with glass cockpit instruments, the layout of the displays conform to the basic T arrangement.

=== Early history ===
In 1929, Jimmy Doolittle became the first pilot to take off, fly and land an airplane using instruments alone, without a view outside the cockpit. In 1937, the British Royal Air Force (RAF) chose a set of six essential flight instruments which would remain the standard panel used for flying in instrument meteorological conditions (IMC) for the next 20 years. They were:

- altimeter (feet)
- airspeed indicator (knots)
- turn and bank indicator (turn direction and coordination)
- vertical speed indicator (feet per minute)
- artificial horizon (attitude indication)
- directional gyro / heading indicator (degrees)

This panel arrangement was incorporated into all RAF aircraft built to official specification from 1938, such as the Miles Master, Hawker Hurricane, Supermarine Spitfire, and 4-engined Avro Lancaster and Handley Page Halifax heavy bombers, but not the earlier light single-engined Tiger Moth trainer, and minimized the type-conversion difficulties associated with blind flying, since a pilot trained on one aircraft could quickly become accustomed to any other if the instruments were identical.

This basic six set, also known as a "six pack", was also adopted by commercial aviation. After the Second World War the arrangement was changed to: (top row) airspeed, artificial horizon, altimeter, (bottom row) turn and bank indicator, heading indicator, vertical speed.

=== Further development ===
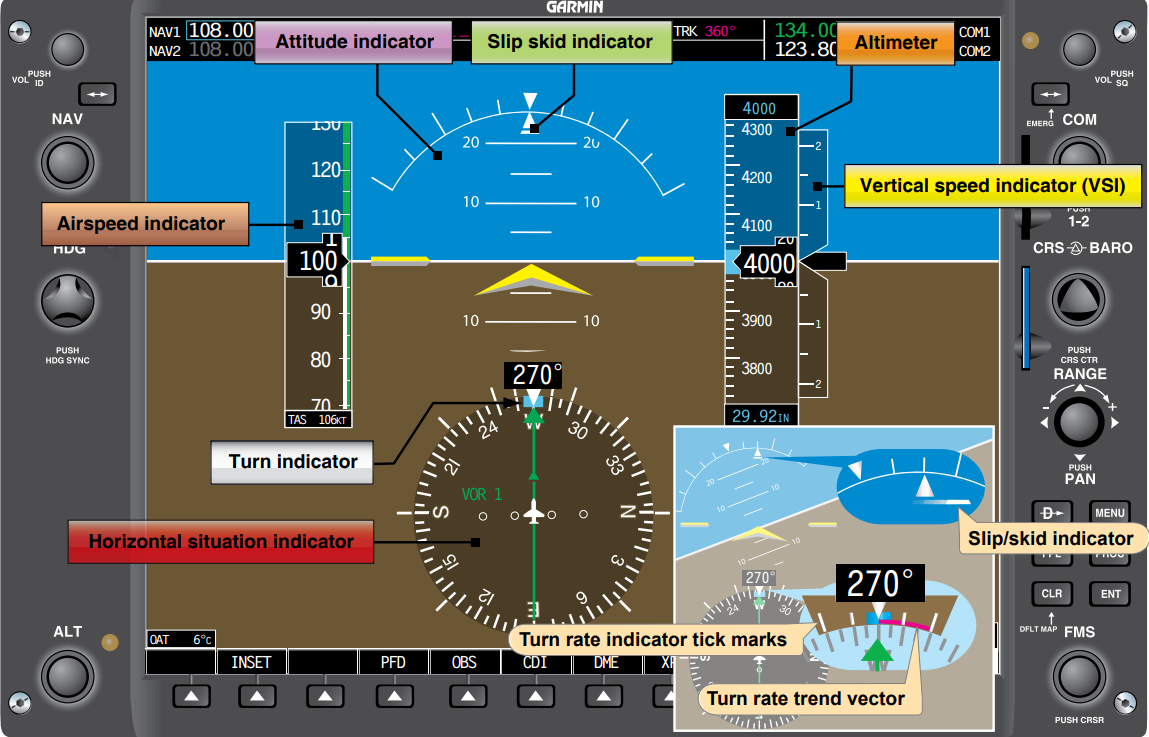
Primary Flight Display (PFD)

In glass cockpits, the flight instruments are shown on monitors. Primary flight display, is given a central place on the panel, superseding the artificial horizon, often, with a horizontal situation indicator next to it or integrated with the PFD. The indicated airspeed, altimeter, and vertical speed indicator are displayed as moving "tapes" with the indicated airspeed to the left of the horizon and the altimeter and the vertical speed to the right in the same layout as in most older style "clock cockpits".

== See also ==
- ICAO recommendations on use of the International System of Units
- Index of aviation articles
- Acronyms and abbreviations in avionics
- Dashboard
- Cockpit
- Control stand
- Glass cockpit
