= Ground speed =

Horizontal speed of an aircraft relative to the ground

Ground speed is the horizontal component of the velocity of an aircraft relative to the Earth’s surface, also referred to as "speed over the ground". It is vital for accurate navigation that the pilot has an estimate of the ground speed that will be achieved during each leg of a flight.

Theoretically, an aircraft diving vertically and unaffected by wind would have a ground speed of zero. Information displayed to passengers through the entertainment system of airline aircraft usually gives the aircraft ground speed rather than airspeed.

Ground speed can be determined by the vector sum of the aircraft's true airspeed and the current wind speed and direction; a headwind subtracts from the ground speed, while a tailwind adds to it. Winds at other angles to the heading will have components of either headwind or tailwind as well as a crosswind component.

An airspeed indicator indicates the aircraft's speed relative to the air mass it is flying through. The air mass may be moving over the ground due to wind, and therefore some additional means to provide position over the ground is required to determine ground speed. This might be through navigation using landmarks, radio aided position location, inertial navigation system, or GPS. When more advanced technology is unavailable, an E6-B flight computer may be used to calculate ground speed. Ground speed radar can measure it directly.

Ground speed is quite different from airspeed. When an aircraft is airborne, its ground speed is not related to the likelihood of a stall, and it doesn't influence the aircraft's performance, such as rate of climb.

== See also ==
- ICAO recommendations on use of the International System of Units
