= True airspeed =

Speed of an aircraft relative to the air mass through which it is flying

An analog true airspeed indicator for an airplane. The pilot sets the pressure altitude and air temperature in the top window using the knob; the needle indicates true airspeed in the lower left window. Here the speed is displayed both in knots (kn) and miles per hour (mph).

The true airspeed (TAS; also KTAS, for knots true airspeed) of an aircraft is the speed of the aircraft relative to the air mass through which it is flying. The true airspeed is important information for accurate navigation of an aircraft. Traditionally it is measured using an analogue TAS indicator, but as GPS has become available for civilian use, the importance of such air-measuring instruments has decreased. Since indicated, as opposed to true, airspeed is a better indicator of margin above the stall, true airspeed is not used for controlling the aircraft; for these purposes the indicated airspeed – IAS or KIAS (knots indicated airspeed) – is used. However, since indicated airspeed only shows true speed through the air at standard sea level pressure and temperature, a TAS meter is necessary for navigation purposes at cruising altitude in less dense air. The IAS meter reads very nearly the TAS at lower altitude and at lower speed. On jet airliners the TAS meter is usually hidden at speeds below 200 knots (370 km/h). Neither provides for accurate speed over the ground, since surface winds or winds aloft are not taken into account.

== Performance ==
TAS is the appropriate speed to use when calculating the range of an airplane. It is the speed normally listed on the flight plan, also used in flight planning, before considering the effects of wind.

== Airspeed sensing errors ==
The airspeed indicator (ASI), driven by ram air into a pitot tube and still air into a barometric static port, shows what is called indicated airspeed (IAS). The differential pressure is affected by air density. The ratio between the two measurements is temperature-dependent and pressure-dependent, according to the ideal gas law.

At sea level in the International Standard Atmosphere (ISA) and at low speeds where air compressibility is negligible (i.e., assuming a constant air density), IAS corresponds to TAS. When the air density or temperature around the aircraft differs from standard sea level conditions, IAS will no longer correspond to TAS, thus it will no longer reflect aircraft performance. The ASI will indicate less than TAS when the air density decreases due to a change in altitude or air temperature. For this reason, TAS cannot be measured directly. In flight, it can be calculated either by using an E6-B flight computer or its equivalent.

For low speeds, the data required are static air temperature, pressure altitude and IAS (or CAS for more precision). Above approximately 100 knots (190 km/h), the compressibility error rises significantly and TAS must be calculated by the Mach speed. Mach incorporates the above data including the compressibility factor. Modern aircraft instrumentation use an air data computer to perform this calculation in real time and display the TAS reading directly on the electronic flight instrument system.

Since temperature variations are of a smaller influence, the ASI error can be estimated as indicating about 2% less than TAS per 1,000 feet (300 m) of altitude above sea level. For example, an aircraft flying at 15,000 feet (4,600 m) in the international standard atmosphere with an IAS of 100 knots (190 km/h), is actually flying at 126 knots (233 km/h) TAS.

== Use in navigation calculations ==
To maintain a desired ground track while flying in the moving airmass, the pilot of an aircraft must use knowledge of wind speed, wind direction, and true air speed to determine the required heading. See also wind triangle.

== Calculating true airspeed ==
=== Low-speed flight ===
At low speeds and altitudes, IAS and CAS are close to equivalent airspeed (EAS).

$\rho_0 (EAS)^2 = \rho (TAS)^2$

TAS can be calculated as a function of EAS and air density:

$\mathrm{TAS} =\frac { \mathrm{EAS}}{\sqrt{\frac{\rho}{\rho_0}}}$

where

$\mathrm{TAS}$ is true airspeed,
$\mathrm{EAS}$ is equivalent airspeed,
$\rho_0$ is the air density at sea level in the International Standard Atmosphere (15 °C and 1013.25 hectopascals, corresponding to a density of 1.225 kg/m^{3}),
$\rho$ is the density of the air in which the aircraft is flying.

=== High-speed flight ===
TAS can be calculated as a function of Mach number and static air temperature:

$\mathrm{TAS} ={a_0} M\sqrt{T\over T_0},$

where

${a_0}$ is the speed of sound at standard sea level (661.47 knots (1,225.04 km/h; 340.29 m/s)),
$M$ is Mach number,
$T$ is static air temperature in kelvins,
$T_0$ is the temperature at standard sea level (288.15 K).

For manual calculation of TAS in knots, where Mach number and static air temperature are known, the expression may be simplified to

$\mathrm{TAS} = 39M\sqrt{T}$

(remembering temperature is in kelvins).

Combining the above with the expression for Mach number gives an expression for TAS as a function of impact pressure, static pressure and static air temperature (valid for subsonic flow):

$\mathrm{TAS} = a_0\sqrt{\frac{5T}{T_0}\left[\left(\frac{q_c}{P} + 1\right)^\frac{2}{7} - 1\right]},$

where:

$q_c$ is impact pressure,
$P$ is static pressure.

Electronic flight instrument systems (EFIS) contain an air data computer with inputs of impact pressure, static pressure and total air temperature. In order to compute TAS, the air data computer must convert total air temperature to static air temperature. This is also a function of Mach number:

$T = \frac{T_\text{t}}{1 + 0.2M^2},$

where

$T_\text{t} =$ total air temperature.

In simple aircraft, without an air data computer or machmeter, true airspeed can be calculated as a function of calibrated airspeed and local air density (or static air temperature and pressure altitude, which determine density). Some airspeed indicators incorporate a slide rule mechanism to perform this calculation. Otherwise, it can be performed using this applet or a device such as the E6-B (a handheld circular slide rule).

== See also ==
- Acronyms and abbreviations in avionics
- ICAO recommendations on use of the International System of Units
- Air speed
- Airspeed indicator
- Calibrated airspeed
- Equivalent airspeed
- Flight instruments
- Flight planning
- Indicated airspeed
