= Airspeed indicator =

Flight instrument

The airspeed indicator (ASI) or airspeed gauge is a flight instrument indicating the airspeed of an aircraft in kilometres per hour (km/h), knots (kn or kt), miles per hour (MPH) and/or metres per second (m/s). The recommendation by ICAO is to use km/h, however knots (kt) is currently the most used unit. The ASI measures the pressure differential between static pressure from the static port, and total pressure from the pitot tube. This difference in pressure is registered with the ASI pointer on the face of the instrument.

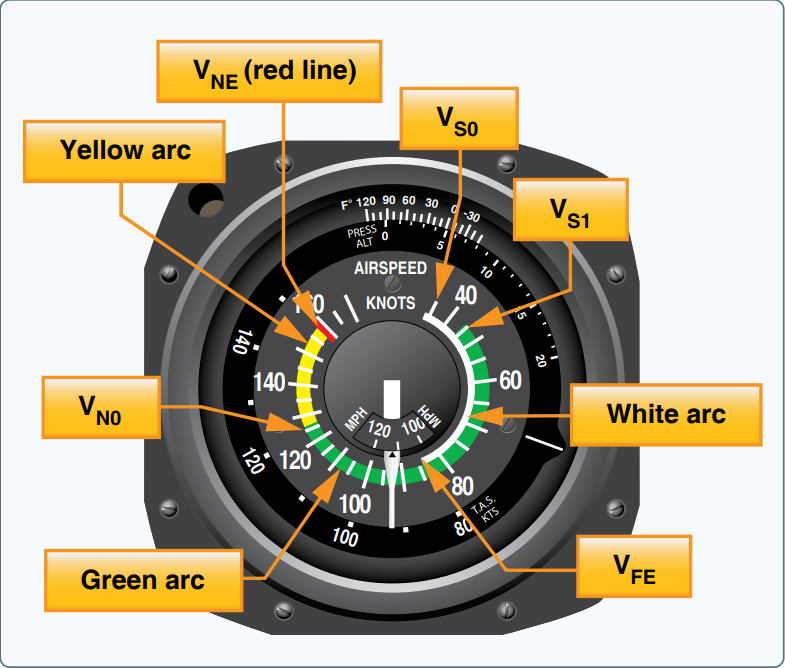
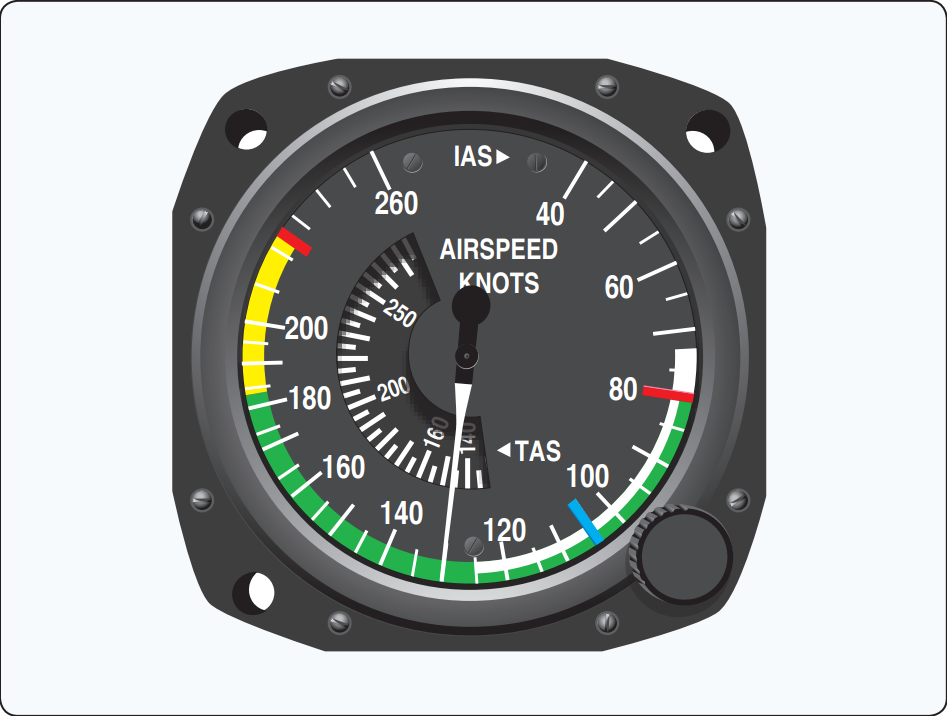
Single-engine ASI (left) with V speeds labelled, and Multi-engine ASI (centre) with blue and red radial lines, as well as (right) showing knots only

== Colour-coded speeds and ranges ==
The ASI has standard colour-coded markings to indicate safe operation within the limitations of the aircraft. At a glance, the pilot can determine a recommended speed (V speeds) or if speed adjustments are needed. Single and multi-engine aircraft have common markings. For instance, the green arc indicates the normal operating range of the aircraft, from V_{S1} to V_{NO}. The white arc indicates the flap operating range, V_{SO} to V_{FE}, used for approaches and landings. The yellow arc cautions that flight should be conducted in this range only in smooth air, while the red line (V_{NE}) at the top of the yellow arc indicates damage or structural failure may result at higher speeds.

The ASI in multi-engine aircraft includes two additional radial markings, one red and one blue, associated with potential engine failure. The radial red line near the bottom of green arc indicates V_{mc}, the minimum indicated airspeed at which the aircraft can be controlled with the critical engine inoperative. The radial blue line indicates V_{YSE}, the speed for best rate of climb with the critical engine inoperative.

== Operation ==
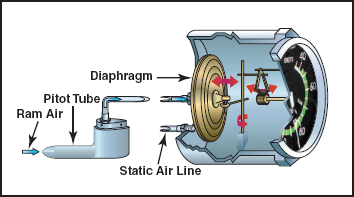
ASI components

The ASI is the only flight instrument that uses both the static system and the pitot system. Static pressure enters the ASI case, while total pressure flexes the diaphragm, which is connected to the ASI pointer via mechanical linkage. The pressures are equal when the aircraft is stationary on the ground, and hence shows a reading of zero. When the aircraft is moving forward, air entering the pitot tube is at a greater pressure than the static line, which flexes the diaphragm, moving the pointer. The ASI is checked before takeoff for a zero reading, and during takeoff that it is increasing appropriately.

The pitot tube may become blocked, because of insects, dirt, ice or failure to remove the pitot cover. A blockage will prevent ram air from entering the system. If the pitot opening is blocked, but the drain hole is open, the system pressure will drop to ambient pressure, and the ASI pointer will drop to a zero reading. If both the opening and drain holes are blocked, the ASI will not indicate any change in airspeed. However, the ASI pointer will show altitude changes, as the associated static pressure changes. If both the pitot tube and the static system are blocked, the ASI pointer will read zero. If the static ports are blocked but the pitot tube remains open, the ASI will operate, but inaccurately.

== Types of airspeeds ==
An airspeed indicator for an aeroplane. Indicated airspeed is displayed on the black background (in this case both in knots (kn) and miles per hour (mph)). The pilot sets the pressure altitude and air temperature in the top window using the knob. Based on that, the white background scale in the lower left window moves to give true airspeed.

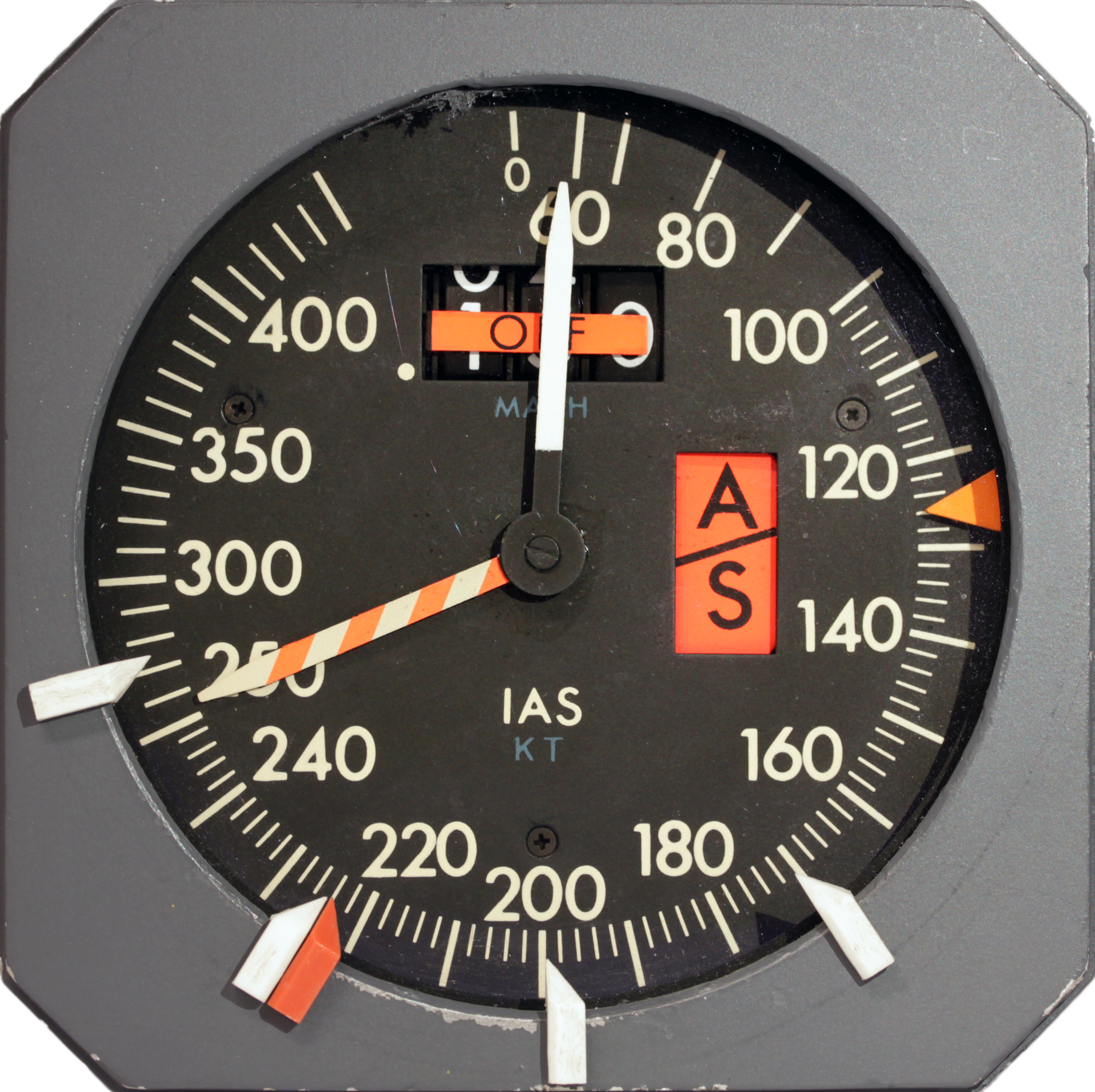
Airspeed indicator with Machmeter, including moveable pointers (bugs) at the bezel. This ASI also has a second hand that indicates the never-exceed speed, which changes with altitude to avoid the onset of transonic shock waves.

There are four types of airspeed that can be remembered with the acronym ICE-T. Indicated airspeed (IAS), is read directly off the ASI. It has no correction for air density variations, installation or instrument errors. Calibrated airspeed (CAS) is corrected for installation and instrument errors. Equivalent airspeed (EAS) is calibrated airspeed (CAS) corrected for the compressibility of air at a non-trivial Mach number. True airspeed (TAS) is CAS corrected for altitude and nonstandard temperature. TAS is used for flight planning. TAS increases as altitude increases, as air density decreases. TAS may be determined via a flight computer, such as the E6-B. Some ASIs have a TAS ring. Alternatively, a rule of thumb is to add 2 percent to the CAS for every 1,000 ft (300 m) of altitude gained.

== Jet aircraft ==
Jet aircraft do not have V_{NO} and V_{NE} like piston-engined aircraft, but instead have a maximum operating speed expressed in knots, V_{MO} and Mach number, M_{MO}. Thus, a pilot of a jet aeroplane needs both an airspeed indicator and a Machmeter, with appropriate red lines. An ASI will include a red-and-white striped pointer, or "barber's pole", that automatically moves to indicate the applicable speed limit at any given altitude.

== Angle of attack and Lift Reserve Indicators ==
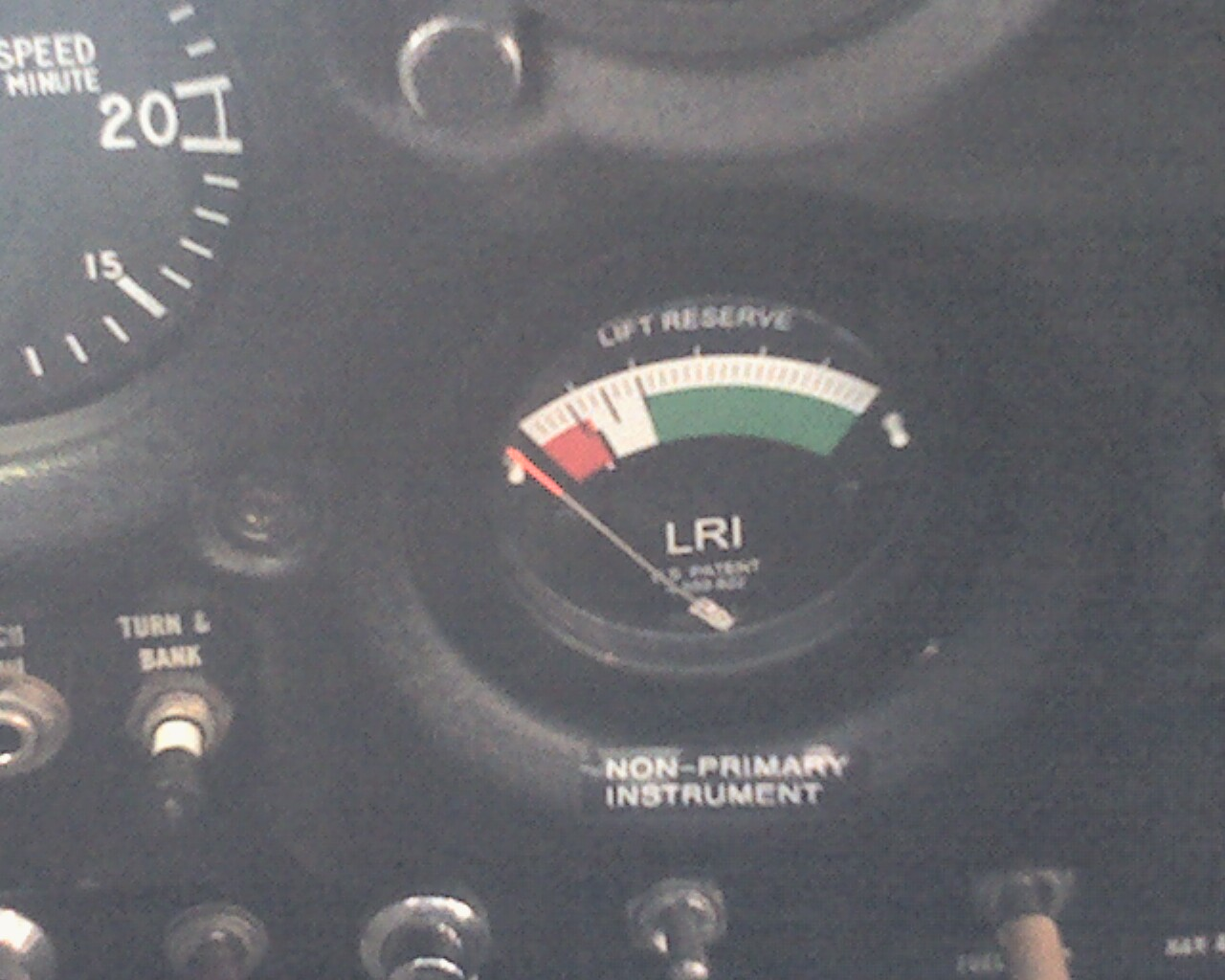
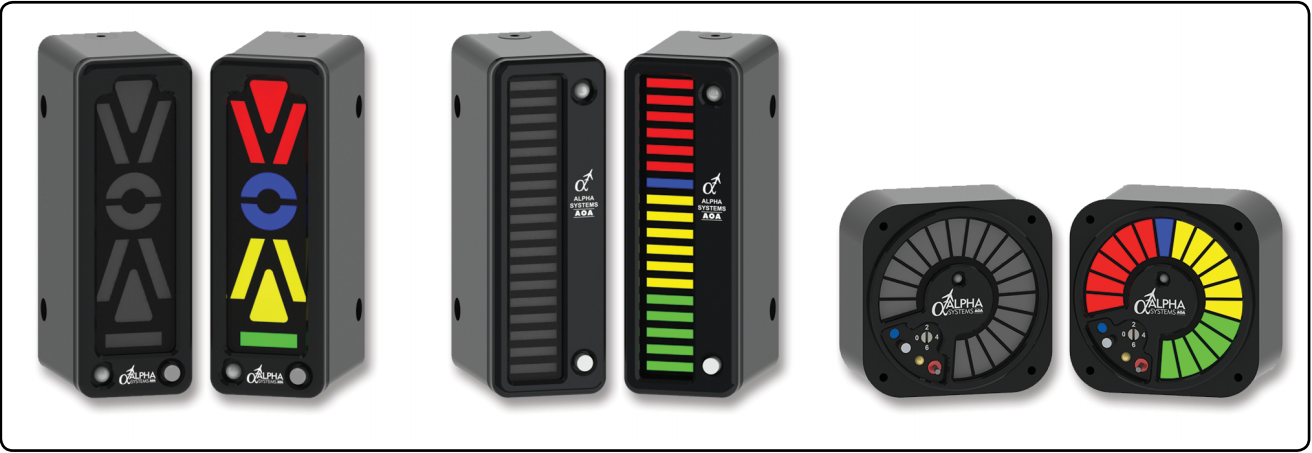
LRI (left) and AOA Indicators (right)

An aeroplane can stall at any speed, so monitoring the ASI alone will not prevent a stall. The critical angle of attack (AOA) determines when an aircraft will stall. For a particular configuration, it is a constant independent of weight, bank angle, temperature, density altitude, and the center of gravity of an aircraft. An AOA indicator provides stall situational awareness as a means for monitoring the onset of the critical AOA. The AOA indicator will show the current AOA and its proximity to the critical AOA.

Similarly, the Lift Reserve Indicator (LRI) provides a measure of the amount of lift being generated. It uses a pressure differential system to provide the pilot with a visual representation of reserve lift available.

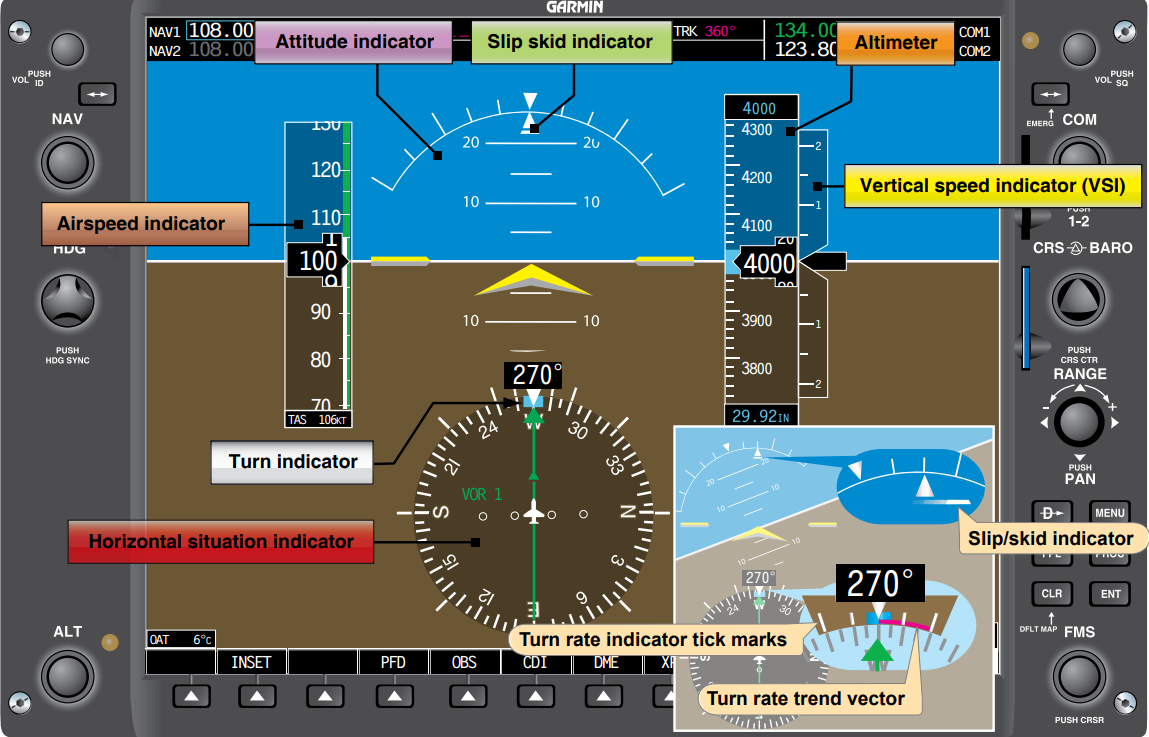
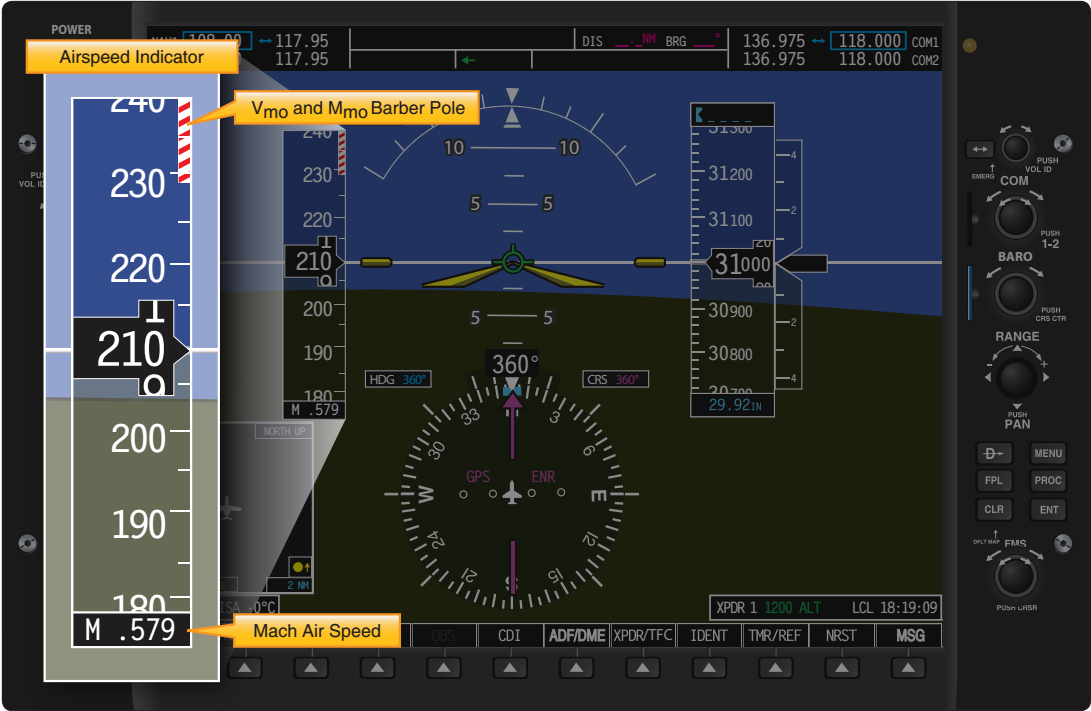
Primary Flight Display (PFD) with the ASI in the form of "Airspeed Tape", including color coded ranges (left), and a combined ASI and Machmeter for a jet aircraft (right)

== See also ==
- Acronyms and abbreviations in avionics
- Flight instruments
- Global Positioning System
- Indicated airspeed
- ICAO recommendations on use of the International System of Units
- Position error
- Speedometer
- V speeds
