= Pitot pressure =

Pitot pressure is the pressure that can be measured by a Pitot tube, with an open-ended tube facing into the oncoming fluid with the other end closed off. The stationary fluid can be connected to a pressure-measuring device, or used in various devices. For subsonic flow, pitot pressure is equal to the stagnation pressure (or total pressure) of the flow, and hence the term pitot pressure is often used interchangeably with these other terms. For supersonic flow, however, pitot pressure is the stagnation pressure of the flow behind the normal shock ahead of the pitot tube. Pitot pressure is named for Henri Pitot, French scientist.
