= Dynamic pressure =

Kinetic energy per unit volume of a fluid

In fluid dynamics, dynamic pressure (denoted by q or Q and sometimes called velocity pressure) is the quantity defined by:

$$q = \frac{1}{2}\rho\, u^2$$

where (in SI units):

- q is the dynamic pressure in pascals (i.e., N/m^{2}),
- ρ (Greek letter rho) is the fluid mass density (e.g. in kg/m^{3}), and
- u is the flow speed in m/s.

It can be thought of as the fluid's kinetic energy per unit volume.

For incompressible flow, the dynamic pressure of a fluid is the difference between its total pressure and static pressure. From Bernoulli's law, dynamic pressure is given by

$$p_0 - p_\text{s} = \frac{1}{2}\rho\, u^2$$

where p_{0} and p_{s} are the total and static pressures, respectively.

== Physical meaning ==
Dynamic pressure is the kinetic energy per unit volume of a fluid. Dynamic pressure is one of the terms of Bernoulli's equation, which can be derived from the conservation of energy for a fluid in motion.

At a stagnation point the dynamic pressure is equal to the difference between the stagnation pressure and the static pressure, so the dynamic pressure in a flow field can be measured at a stagnation point.

Another important aspect of dynamic pressure is that, as dimensional analysis shows, the aerodynamic stress (i.e. stress within a structure subject to aerodynamic forces) experienced by an aircraft travelling at speed $v$ is proportional to the air density and square of $v$, i.e. proportional to $q$. Therefore, by looking at the variation of $q$ during flight, it is possible to determine how the stress will vary and in particular when it will reach its maximum value. The point of maximum aerodynamic load is often referred to as max q and it is a critical parameter in many applications, such as launch vehicles.

Dynamic pressure can also appear as a term in the incompressible Navier-Stokes equation which may be written:

$$\rho\frac{\partial \mathbf{u}}{\partial t} + \rho(\mathbf{u} \cdot \nabla) \mathbf{u} - \rho\nu \,\nabla^2 \mathbf{u} = - \nabla p + \rho\mathbf{g}$$

By a vector calculus identity ($u=| \mathbf{u} |$)

$$\nabla (u^2/2)=(\mathbf{u}\cdot \nabla) \mathbf{u} + \mathbf{u} \times (\nabla \times \mathbf{u})$$

so that for incompressible, irrotational flow ($\nabla \times \mathbf{u}=0$), the second term on the left in the Navier-Stokes equation is just the gradient of the dynamic pressure. In hydraulics, the term $u^2/2g$ is known as the hydraulic velocity head (h_{v}) so that the dynamic pressure is equal to $\rho g h_v$.

== Uses ==
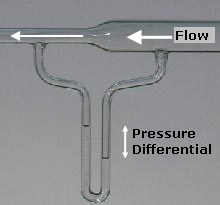
A flow of air through a venturi meter, showing the columns connected in a U-shape (a manometer) and partially filled with water. The meter is "read" as a differential pressure head in cm or inches of water and is equivalent to the difference in velocity head.

The dynamic pressure, along with the static pressure and the pressure due to elevation, is used in Bernoulli's principle as an energy balance on a closed system. The three terms are used to define the state of a closed system of an incompressible, constant-density fluid.

When the dynamic pressure is divided by the product of fluid density and acceleration due to gravity, g, the result is called velocity head, which is used in head equations like the one used for pressure head and hydraulic head. In a venturi flow meter, the differential pressure head can be used to calculate the differential velocity head, which are equivalent in the adjacent picture. An alternative to velocity head is dynamic head.

== Compressible flow ==
Many authors define dynamic pressure only for incompressible flows. (For compressible flows, these authors use the concept of impact pressure.) However, the definition of dynamic pressure can be extended to include compressible flows.

For compressible flow the isentropic relations can be used (also valid for incompressible flow):

$q=p_s\left(1+\frac{\gamma-1}{2}M^2\right)^{\frac{\gamma}{\gamma-1}}-p_s$

Where:

$q\;$	dynamic pressure,
$p_s\;$	static pressure
$M\;$	Mach number (non-dimensional),
$\gamma\;$	ratio of specific heats (non-dimensional; 1.4 for air at sea-level conditions),

== See also ==
- Pressure
- Pressure head
- Hydraulic head
- Total dynamic head
- Drag, lift and pitching moment coefficients
- Derivations of Bernoulli equation
