= Static pressure =

Term in fluid mechanics

In fluid mechanics the term static pressure refers to a term in Bernoulli's equation written as static pressure + dynamic pressure = total pressure. Since pressure measurements at any single point in a fluid always give the static pressure value, the 'static' is often dropped. In the design and operation of aircraft, static pressure is the air pressure in the aircraft's static pressure system.

== Static pressure in fluid dynamics ==
The concept of pressure is central to the study of fluids. A pressure can be identified for every point in a body of fluid, regardless of whether the fluid is in motion. Pressure can be measured using an aneroid, Bourdon tube, mercury column, or various other methods.

The concepts of total pressure and dynamic pressure arise from Bernoulli's equation and are significant in the study of all fluid flows. These two pressures are not pressures in the usual sense - they cannot be measured using a pressure sensor. To avoid potential ambiguity when referring to pressure in fluid dynamics, many authors use the term static pressure to distinguish it from total pressure and dynamic pressure; the term static pressure is identical to the term pressure, and can be identified for every point in a fluid flow field. The static pressure can be measured in flowing fluid using a hole or tube which is perpendicular to the flow.

In Aerodynamics, L.J. Clancy writes: "To distinguish it from the total and dynamic pressures, the actual pressure of the fluid, which is associated not with its motion but with its state, is often referred to as the static pressure, but where the term pressure alone is used it refers to this static pressure."

Bernoulli's equation is foundational to the dynamics of incompressible fluids. In many fluid flow situations of interest, changes in elevation are insignificant and can be ignored. With this simplification, Bernoulli's equation for incompressible flows can be expressed as

$$P + \frac{1}{2} \rho v^2 = P_0,$$

where:

- $P\;$ is static pressure,
- $\frac{1}{2} \rho v^2$ is dynamic pressure, usually denoted by $q\;$,
- $\rho\,$ is the density of the fluid,
- $v\,$ is the flow velocity, and
- $P_0\;$ is total pressure which is constant along any streamline. It is also known as the stagnation pressure.

Every point in a steadily flowing fluid, regardless of the fluid speed at that point, has its own static pressure $P$, dynamic pressure $q$, and total pressure $P_0$. Static pressure and dynamic pressure are likely to vary significantly throughout the fluid but total pressure is constant along each streamline. In irrotational flow, total pressure is the same on all streamlines and is therefore constant throughout the flow.

The simplified form of Bernoulli's equation can be summarised in the following memorable word equation:

static pressure + dynamic pressure = total pressure.

This simplified form of Bernoulli's equation is fundamental to an understanding of the design and operation of ships, low speed aircraft, and airspeed indicators for low speed aircraft – that is aircraft whose maximum speed will be less than about 30% of the speed of sound.

As a consequence of the widespread understanding of the term static pressure in relation to Bernoulli's equation, many authors in the field of fluid dynamics also use static pressure rather than pressure in applications not directly related to Bernoulli's equation.

The British Standards Institution, in its Standard Glossary of Aeronautical Terms, gives the following definition:

4412 Static pressure The pressure at a point on a body moving with the fluid.

== Static pressure in design and operation of aircraft ==
An aircraft's static pressure system is the key input to its altimeter and, along with the pitot pressure system, also drives the airspeed indicator.

The static pressure system is open to the aircraft's exterior through a small opening called the static port, which allows sensing the ambient atmospheric pressure at the altitude at which the aircraft is flying. In flight, the air pressure varies slightly at different positions around the aircraft's exterior, so designers must select the static ports' locations carefully. Wherever they are located, the air pressure that the ports observe will generally be affected by the aircraft's instantaneous angle of attack. The difference between that observed pressure and the actual atmospheric pressure (at altitude) causes a small position error in the instruments' indicated altitude and airspeed. A designer's objective in locating the static port is to minimize the resulting position error across the aircraft's operating range of weight and airspeed.

Many authors describe the atmospheric pressure at the altitude at which the aircraft is flying as the freestream static pressure. At least one author takes a different approach in order to avoid a need for the expression freestream static pressure. Gracey has written "The static pressure is the atmospheric pressure at the flight level of the aircraft". Gracey then refers to the air pressure at any point close to the aircraft as the local static pressure.

== Static pressure in fluid statics ==
The term (hydro)static pressure is sometimes used in fluid statics to refer to the pressure of a fluid at a nominated depth in the fluid. In fluid statics the fluid is stationary everywhere and the concepts of dynamic pressure and total pressure are not applicable. Consequently, there is little risk of ambiguity in using the term pressure, but some authors choose to use static pressure in some situations.

== See also ==
- Pascal's law
- Stagnation pressure
- Standard conditions for temperature and pressure
