= Visual Aural Radio Range =

Radio navigation aid

The Visual Aural Radio Range (VAR) was a short range radio navigation aid, used from about 1940 until 1960, that provided four-course visual and aural track guidance signals at a range of about 100 miles.

The VAR bridged the technological gap between the Low-Frequency Radio Range (LFR) radio navigation system and the VHF omnidirectional range (VOR) navigation system. VAR provided four courses for navigation, two using visual instrument signals functionally and technically similar to the modern localizer and backbeam components used in the ILS system and two using audio signals similar to the LFR system. VAR also used marker beacons similar to the ILS.

== History ==
=== In the United States ===
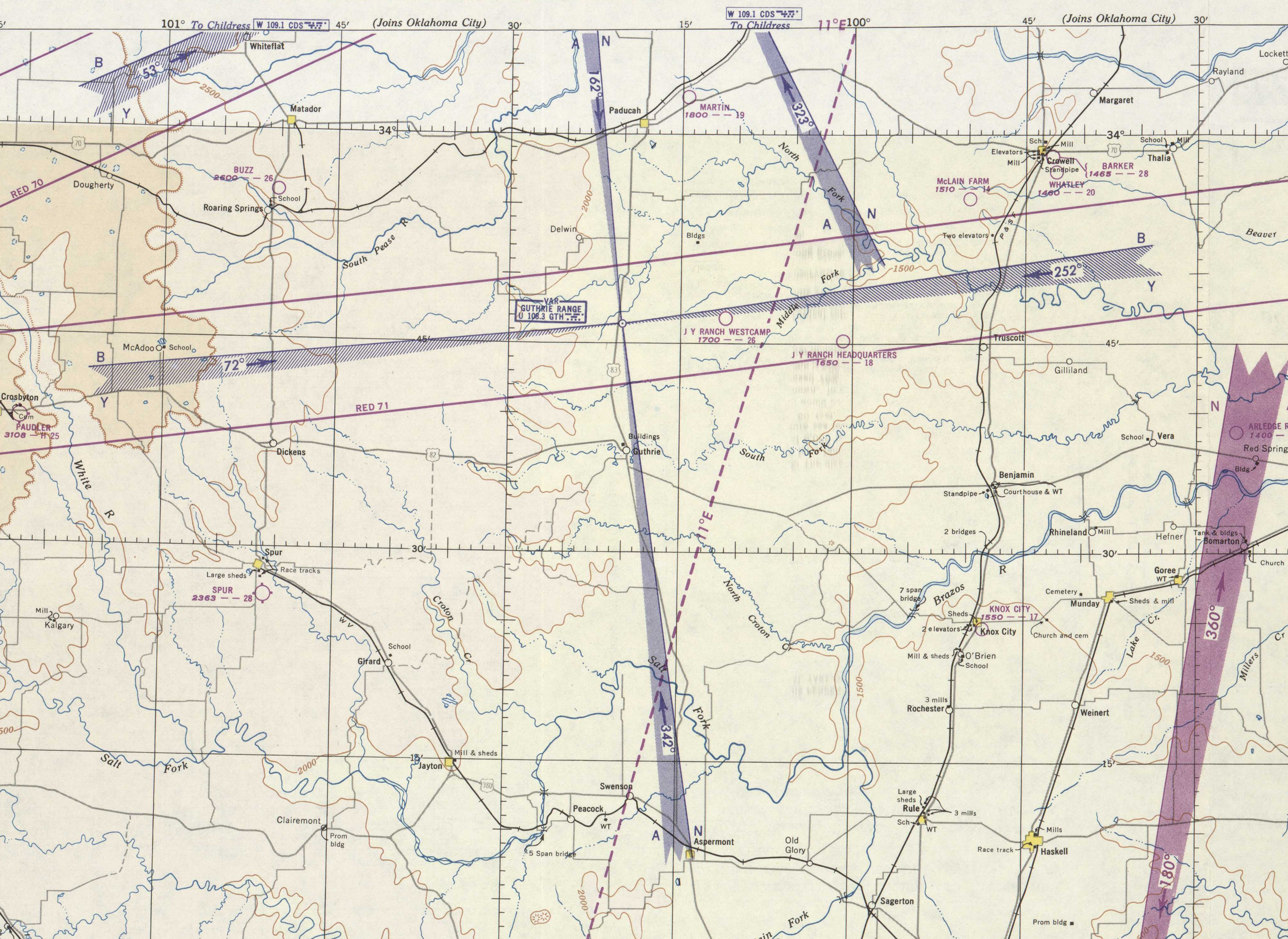
Depiction of a VAR on the 1950 Dallas sectional chart.

The Bureau of Air Commerce created a demonstration version of the VAR in 1937 at an Indianapolis research center. A demonstration version of the VAR system was built in 1941 between Chicago and New York.

Initially, war shortages of VHF radio equipment prevented the system from being widely deployed. The first operational installation of a VAR was in Matawan, New Jersey in 1944. By 1948, the Civil Aeronautics Authority had built 68 VAR installations on various federal airways across the United States. Quickly overtaken by the more advanced VOR system, VARs never replaced LFR as the primary airway navigation system of the United States. The last VAR was decommissioned in 1960.
