= VHF omnidirectional range =

Aviation navigation system

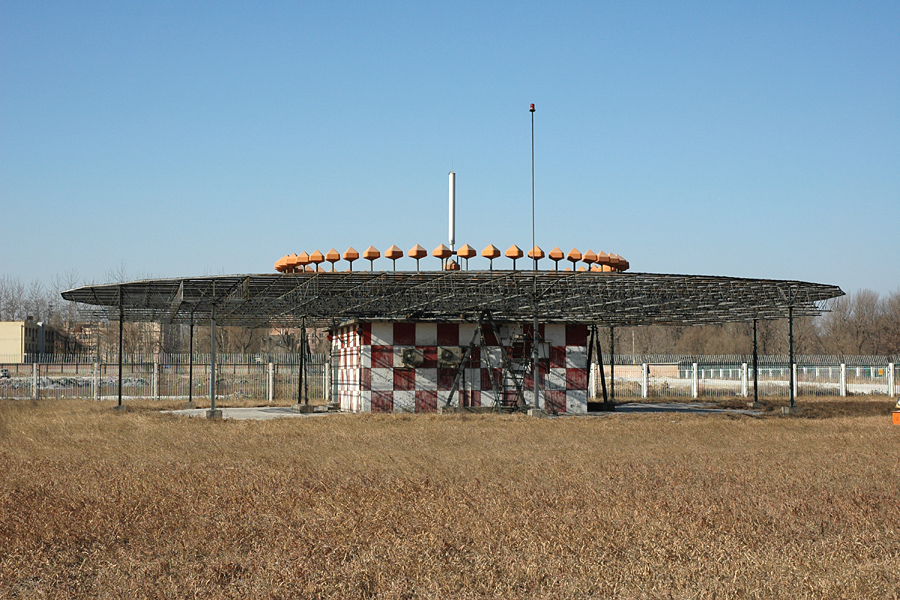
DVOR (Doppler VOR) ground station, collocated with DME.

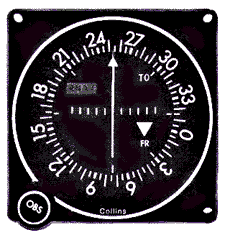
On-board VOR display with CDI

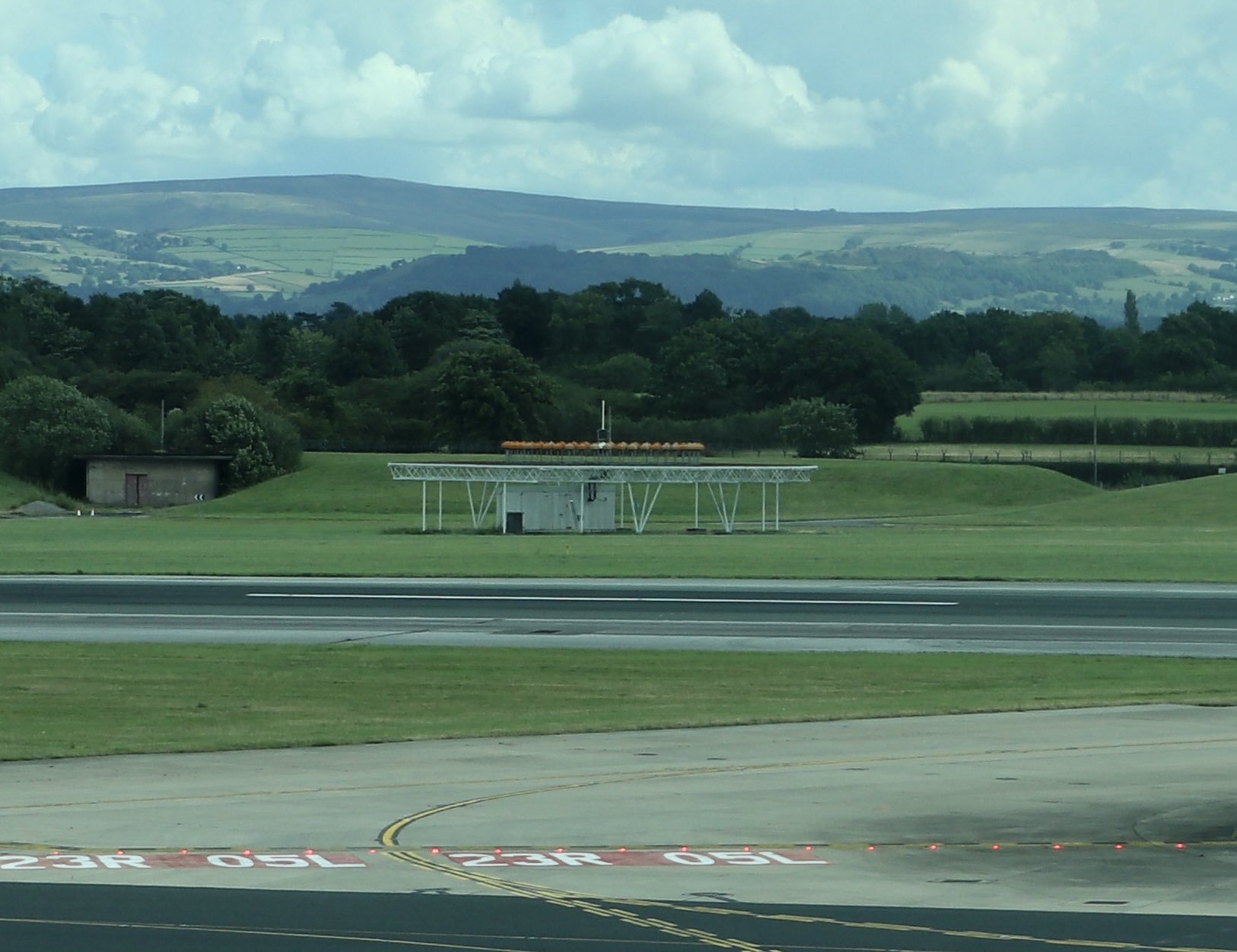
MCT DVOR, Manchester Airport, United Kingdom.

A very high frequency omnidirectional range station (VOR) is a type of short-range VHF radio navigation system for aircraft, enabling aircraft with a VOR receiver to determine the azimuth (also radial), referenced to magnetic north, between the aircraft to/from fixed VOR ground radio beacons. VOR and the first DME_{(1950)} system (referenced to 1950 since different from today's DME/N) to provide the slant range distance, were developed in the United States as part of a U.S. civil/military program for Aeronautical Navigation Aids in 1945. Deployment of VOR and DME_{(1950)} began in 1949 by the U.S. CAA (Civil Aeronautics Administration). ICAO standardized VOR and DME_{(1950)} in 1950 in ICAO Annex, Edition 1. Frequencies for the use of VOR are standardized in the very high frequency (VHF) band between 108.00 and 117.95 MHz. To improve azimuth accuracy of VOR even under difficult siting conditions, Doppler VOR (DVOR) was developed in the 1960s. VOR is according to ICAO rules a primary means navigation system for commercial and general aviation, (D)VOR are gradually decommissioned and replaced by DME-DME RNAV (area navigation)^{7.2.3} and satellite based navigation systems such as GPS in the early 21st century. In 2000 there were about 3,000 VOR stations operating around the world, including 1,033 in the US, but by 2013 the number in the US had been reduced to 967. The United States is decommissioning approximately half of its VOR stations and other legacy navigation aids as part of a move to performance-based navigation, while still retaining a "Minimum Operational Network" of VOR stations as a backup to GPS. In 2015, the UK started to reduce the number of stations from 44 to 19 which it completed in 2020.

A VOR beacon radiates via two or more antennas an amplitude modulated signal and a frequency modulated subcarrier. By comparing the fixed 30 Hz reference signal with the rotating azimuth 30 Hz signal the azimuth from an aircraft to a (D)VOR is detected. The phase difference is indicative of the bearing from the (D)VOR station to the receiver relative to magnetic north. This line of position is called the VOR "radial". While providing the same signal over the air at the VOR receiver antennas. DVOR is based on the Doppler shift to modulate the azimuth dependent 30 Hz signal in space, by continuously switching the signal of about 25 antenna pairs that form a circle around the center 30 Hz reference antenna.

The intersection of radials from two different VOR stations can be used to fix the position of the aircraft, as in earlier radio direction finding (RDF) systems.

VOR stations are short range navigation aids limited to the radio-line-of-sight (RLOS) between transmitter and receiver in an aircraft. Depending on the site elevation of the VOR and altitude of the aircraft Designated Operational Coverages (DOC) of at max. about 200 nautical miles (370 kilometres) ^{Att.C, Fig.C-13} can be achieved. The prerequisite is that the EIRP provides in spite of losses, e.g. due to propagation and antenna pattern lobing, for a sufficiently strong signal at the aircraft VOR antenna that it can be processed successfully by the VOR receiver. Each (D)VOR station broadcasts a VHF radio composite signal, including the mentioned navigation and reference signal, and a station's identifier and optional additional voice. ^{3.3.5} The station's identifier is typically a three-letter string in Morse code. While defined in Annex 10 voice channel is seldomly used today, e.g. for recorded advisories like ATIS. ^{3.3.6}

A VORTAC is a radio-based navigational aid for aircraft pilots consisting of a co-located VHF omnidirectional range and a tactical air navigation system (TACAN) beacon. Both types of beacons provide pilots azimuth information, but the VOR system is generally used by civil aircraft and the TACAN system by military aircraft. However, the TACAN distance measuring equipment is also used for civil purposes because civil DME equipment is built to match the military DME specifications. Most VOR installations in the United States are VORTACs. The system was designed and developed by the Cardion Corporation. The Research, Development, Test, and Evaluation (RDT&E) contract was awarded 28 December 1981.

== Description ==
=== History ===
In 1937, David G. C. Luck filed a patent for a rotating radio beacon on behalf of RCA Corporation, which was issued in 1940. He followed that with two additional patents in 1940 for omnidirectional radio range. Previous radio beacons confined a pilot to a definite course, without information as to how far off course he may be. Luck described his radio range beacon as a radio lighthouse, "All this works like a lighthouse that sends out two kinds of light, one a beam that sweeps around steadily and the other a flash sent out in all directions just as the beam points north. Time the interval from the flash until the beam sweeps over you, and you know your exact direction from the lighthouse."

Developed from earlier Visual Aural Radio Range (VAR) systems, the development of VOR was part of a U.S. civil/military program for aeronautical navigation aids. In 1949 VOR for the azimuth/bearing of an aircraft to/from a VOR installation and UHF DME_{(1950)} and the first ICAO Distance Measuring Equipment standard, were put in operation by the U.S. CAA (Civil Aeronautics Administration). In 1950 ICAO standardized VOR and DME_{(1950)} in Annex 10 ed.1.

The VOR was designed to provide 360 courses to and from the station, selectable by the pilot. Early vacuum tube transmitters with mechanically rotated antennas were widely installed in the 1950s, and began to be replaced with fully solid-state units in the early 1960s. DVOR was gradually implemented and became the major radio navigation system in the 1960s, when they took over from the older radio beacon and four-course (low/medium frequency range) system. Some of the older range stations survived, with the four-course directional features removed, as non-directional low or medium frequency radiobeacons (NDBs).

Aeronautical chart VOR pictograms
VOR

VOR/DME

VORTAC

A worldwide land-based network of "air highways", known in the US as Victor airways (below 18,000 ft or 5,500 m) and "jet routes" (at and above 18,000 feet), was set up linking VORs. An aircraft can follow a specific path from station to station by tuning into the successive stations on the VOR receiver, and then either following the desired course on a Radio Magnetic Indicator, or setting it on a course deviation indicator (CDI) or a horizontal situation indicator (HSI, a more sophisticated version of the VOR indicator) and keeping a course pointer centered on the display.

As of 2005, due to advances in technology, many airports are replacing VOR and NDB approaches with RNAV (GNSS) approach procedures; however, receiver and data update costs are still significant enough that many small general aviation aircraft are not equipped with GNSS equipment certified for primary navigation or approaches.

=== Features ===
VOR signals provide considerably greater accuracy and reliability than NDBs due to a combination of factors. Most significant is that VOR provides a bearing from the station to the aircraft which does not vary with wind or orientation of the aircraft. VHF radio is less vulnerable to diffraction (course bending) around terrain features and coastlines. Phase encoding suffers less interference from thunderstorms.

VOR signals offer a predictable accuracy of 90 m (300 ft), 2 sigma at 2 NM from a pair of VOR beacons; as compared to the accuracy of unaugumented Global Positioning System (GPS) which is less than 13 meters, 95%.

VOR stations, being VHF, operate on "line of sight". This means that if, on a perfectly clear day, you cannot see the transmitter from the receiver antenna, or vice versa, the signal will be either imperceptible or unusable. This limits VOR (and DME) range to the horizon—or closer if mountains intervene. Although the modern solid state transmitting equipment requires much less maintenance than the older units, an extensive network of stations, needed to provide reasonable coverage along main air routes, is a significant cost in operating current airway systems.

Typically, a VOR station's identifier represents a nearby town, city or airport. For example, the VOR station located on the grounds of John F. Kennedy International Airport has the identifier JFK.

=== Operation ===
VORs are assigned radio channels between 108.0 MHz and 117.95 MHz (with 50 kHz spacing); this is in the very high frequency (VHF) range. The first 4 MHz is shared with the instrument landing system (ILS) band. In the United States, frequencies within the pass band of 108.00 to 111.95 MHz which have an even 100 kHz first digit after the decimal point (108.00, 108.05, 108.20, 108.25, and so on) are reserved for VOR frequencies while frequencies within the 108.00 to 111.95 MHz pass band with an odd 100 kHz first digit after the decimal point (108.10, 108.15, 108.30, 108.35, and so on) are reserved for ILS.

The VOR encodes azimuth (direction from the station) as the phase relationship between a reference signal and a variable signal. One of them is amplitude modulated, and one is frequency modulated. On conventional VORs (CVOR), the 30 Hz reference signal is frequency modulated (FM) on a 9,960 Hz subcarrier. On these VORs, the amplitude modulation is achieved by rotating a slightly directional antenna exactly in phase with the reference signal at 30 revolutions per second. Modern installations are Doppler VORs (DVOR), which use a circular array of typically 48 omnidirectional antennas and no moving parts. The active antenna is moved around the circular array electronically to create a doppler effect, resulting in frequency modulation. The amplitude modulated signal is transmitted from a separate omnidirectional antenna. The roles of amplitude and frequency modulation are thus swapped in this type of VOR. Decoding in the receiving aircraft happens in the same way for both types of VORs: the AM and FM 30 Hz components are detected and then compared to determine the phase angle between them.

The VOR signal also contains a modulated continuous wave (MCW) 7 wpm Morse code station identifier, and usually contains an amplitude modulated (AM) voice channel.

This information is then fed over an analog or digital interface to one of four common types of indicators:

1. A typical light-airplane VOR indicator, sometimes called an "omni-bearing indicator" or OBI is shown in the illustration at the top of this entry. It consists of a knob to rotate an "Omni Bearing Selector" (OBS), the OBS scale around the outside of the instrument, and a vertical course deviation indicator or (CDI) pointer. The OBS is used to set the desired course, and the CDI is centered when the aircraft is on the selected course, or gives left/right steering commands to return to the course. An "ambiguity" (TO-FROM) indicator shows whether following the selected course would take the aircraft to, or away from the station. The indicator may also include a glideslope pointer for use when receiving full ILS signals.
2. A radio magnetic indicator (RMI) features a course arrow superimposed on a rotating card that shows the aircraft's current heading at the top of the dial. The "tail" of the course arrow points at the current radial from the station and the "head" of the arrow points at the reciprocal (180° different) course to the station. An RMI may present information from more than one VOR or ADF receiver simultaneously.
3. A horizontal situation indicator (HSI), developed subsequently to the RMI, is considerably more expensive and complex than a standard VOR indicator but combines heading information with the navigation display in a much more user-friendly format, approximating a simplified moving map.
4. An area navigation (RNAV) system is an onboard computer with display and may include an up-to-date navigation database. At least one VOR/DME station is required for the computer to plot aircraft position on a moving map or to display course deviation and distance relative to a waypoint (virtual VOR station). RNAV type systems have also been made to use two VORs or two DMEs to define a waypoint; these are typically referred to by other names such as "distance computing equipment" for the dual-VOR type or "DME-DME" for the type using more than one DME signal.

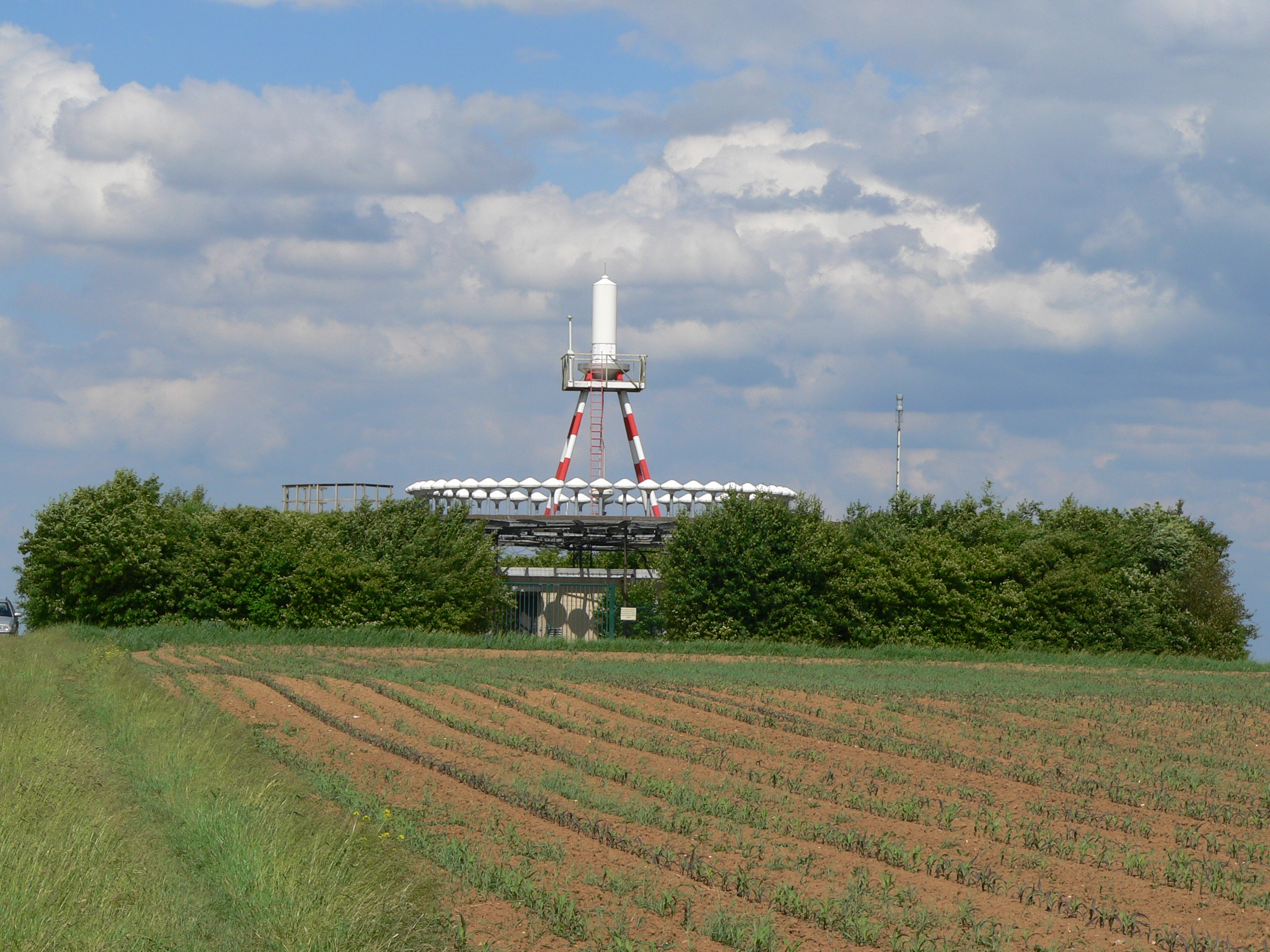
D-VORTAC TGO (TANGO) Germany

In many cases, VOR stations have co-located distance measuring equipment (DME) or military Tactical Air Navigation (TACAN) – the latter includes both the DME distance feature and a separate TACAN azimuth feature that provides military pilots data similar to the civilian VOR. A co-located VOR and TACAN beacon is called a VORTAC. A VOR co-located only with DME is called a VOR-DME. A VOR radial with a DME distance allows a one-station position fix. Both VOR-DMEs and TACANs share the same DME system.

VORTACs and VOR-DMEs use a standardized scheme of VOR frequency to TACAN/DME channel pairing so that a specific VOR frequency is always paired with a specific co-located TACAN or DME channel. On civilian equipment, the VHF frequency is tuned and the appropriate TACAN/DME channel is automatically selected.

While the operating principles are different, VORs share some characteristics with the localizer portion of ILS and the same antenna, receiving equipment and indicator is used in the cockpit for both. When a VOR station is selected, the OBS is functional and allows the pilot to select the desired radial to use for navigation. When a localizer frequency is selected, the OBS is not functional and the indicator is driven by a localizer converter, typically built into the receiver or indicator.

=== Service volumes ===
A VOR station serves a volume of airspace called its Service Volume. Some VORs have a relatively small geographic area protected from interference by other stations on the same frequency—called "terminal" or T-VORs. Other stations may have protection out to 130 nautical miles (240 kilometres) or more. It is popularly thought that there is a standard difference in power output between T-VORs and other stations, but in fact the stations' power output is set to provide adequate signal strength in the specific site's service volume.

In the United States, there are three standard service volumes (SSV): terminal, low, and high (standard service volumes do not apply to published instrument flight rules (IFR) routes).

Additionally, two new service volumes – "VOR low" and "VOR high" – were added in 2021, providing expanded coverage above 5,000 feet AGL. This allows aircraft to continue to receive off-route VOR signals despite the reduced number of VOR ground stations provided by the VOR Minimum Operational Network.

US standard service volumes (from FAA AIM)
SSV class designator	Dimensions
T (terminal)	From 1,000 feet above ground level (AGL) up to and including 12,000 feet AGL at radial distances out to 25 NM.
L (low altitude)	From 1,000 feet AGL up to and including 18,000 feet AGL at radial distances out to 40 NM.
H (high altitude)	From 1,000 feet AGL up to and including 14,500 feet AGL at radial distances out to 40 NM. From 14,500 AGL up to and including 18,000 feet at radial distances out to 100 NM. From 18,000 feet AGL up to and including 45,000 feet AGL at radial distances out to 130 NM. From 45,000 feet AGL up to and including 60,000 feet at radial distances out to 100 NM.
VL (VOR Low)	From 1,000 feet ATH up to but not including 5,000 feet ATH at radial distances out to 40 NM. From 5,000 feet ATH up to but not including 18,000 feet ATH at radial distances out to 70 NM.
VH (VOR High)	From 1,000 feet ATH up to but not including 5,000 feet ATH at radial distances out to 40 NM. From 5,000 feet ATH up to but not including 14,500 feet ATH at radial distances out to 70 NM. From 14,500 ATH up to and including 60,000 feet at radial distances out to 100 NM. From 18,000 feet ATH up to and including 45,000 feet ATH at radial distances out to 130 NM.

=== VORs, airways and the en route structure ===
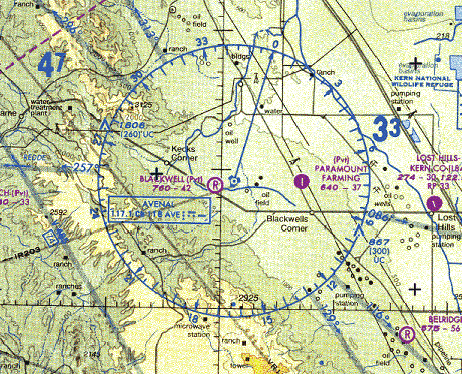
The Avenal VORTAC (at 35.646999,-119.978996) shown on a sectional aeronautical chart. Notice the light blue Victor Airways radiating from the VORTAC. (click to enlarge)

VOR and the older NDB stations were traditionally used as intersections along airways. A typical airway will hop from station to station in straight lines. When flying in a commercial airliner, an observer will notice that the aircraft flies in straight lines occasionally broken by a turn to a new course. These turns are often made as the aircraft passes over a VOR station or at an intersection in the air defined by one or more VORs. Navigational reference points can also be defined by the point at which two radials from different VOR stations intersect, or by a VOR radial and a DME distance. This is the basic form of RNAV and allows navigation to points located away from VOR stations. As RNAV systems have become more common, in particular those based on GPS, more and more airways have been defined by such points, removing the need for some of the expensive ground-based VORs.

In many countries there are two separate systems of airway at lower and higher levels: the lower Airways (known in the US as Victor Airways) and Upper Air Routes (known in the US as Jet routes).

Most aircraft equipped for instrument flight (IFR) have at least two VOR receivers. As well as providing a backup to the primary receiver, the second receiver allows the pilot to easily follow a radial to or from one VOR station while watching the second receiver to see when a certain radial from another VOR station is crossed, allowing the aircraft's exact position at that moment to be determined, and giving the pilot the option of changing to the new radial if they wish.

=== Future ===
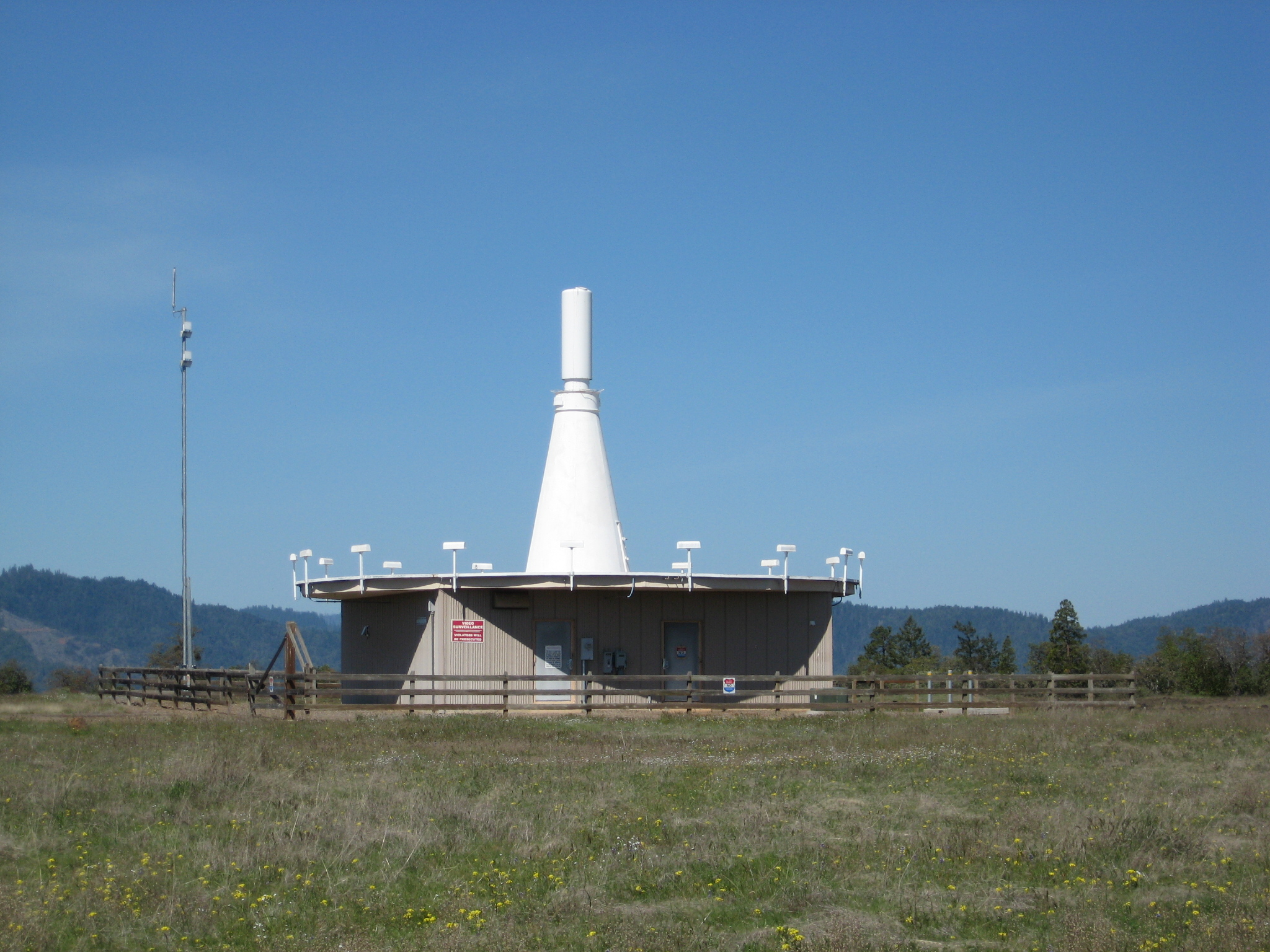
VORTAC located on Upper Table Rock in Jackson County, Oregon

As of 2008, space-based Global Navigation Satellite Systems (GNSS) such as the Global Positioning System (GPS) are increasingly replacing VOR and other ground-based systems. In 2016, GNSS was mandated as the primary needs of navigation for IFR aircraft in Australia.

GNSS systems have a lower transmitter cost per customer and provide distance and altitude data. Future satellite navigation systems, such as the European Union Galileo, and GPS augmentation systems are developing techniques to eventually equal or exceed VOR accuracy. However, low VOR receiver cost, broad installed base and commonality of receiver equipment with ILS are likely to extend VOR dominance in aircraft until space receiver cost falls to a comparable level. As of 2008 in the United States, GPS-based approaches outnumbered VOR-based approaches but VOR-equipped IFR aircraft outnumber GPS-equipped IFR aircraft.

There is some concern that GNSS navigation is subject to interference or sabotage, leading in many countries to the retention of VOR stations for use as a backup. The VOR signal has the advantage of static mapping to local terrain.

The US FAA plans by 2020 to decommission roughly half of the 967 VOR stations in the US, retaining a "Minimum Operational Network" to provide coverage to all aircraft more than 5,000 feet above the ground. Most of the decommissioned stations will be east of the Rocky Mountains, where there is more overlap in coverage between them. On July 27, 2016, a final policy statement was released specifying stations to be decommissioned by 2025. A total of 74 stations are to be decommissioned in Phase 1 (2016–2020), and 234 more stations are scheduled to be taken out of service in Phase 2 (2021–2025).

In the UK, 19 VOR transmitters are to be kept operational until at least 2020. Those at Cranfield and Dean Cross were decommissioned in 2014, with the remaining 25 to be assessed between 2015 and 2020. Similar efforts are underway in Australia, and elsewhere.

In the UK and the United States, DME transmitters are planned to be retained in the near future even after co-located VORs are decommissioned. However, there are long-term plans to decommission DME, TACAN and NDBs.

== Technical specification ==
The VOR signal encodes a morse code identifier, optional voice, and a pair of navigation tones. The radial azimuth is equal to the phase angle between the lagging and leading navigation tone.

=== Constants ===
Standard modulation modes, indices, and frequencies
Description	Formula	Notes	Min	Nom	Max	Units
ident	i(t)	on		1		
ident	i(t)	off		0		
ident	M_{i}	A1 modulation index		0.07		
ident	F_{i}	A1 subcarrier frequency		1020		Hz
voice	a(t)		−1		+1	
voice	M_{a}	A3 modulation index		0.30		
navigation	F_{n}	A0 tone frequency		30		Hz
variable	M_{n}	A3 modulation index		0.30		
reference	M_{d}	A3 modulation index		0.30		
reference	F_{s}	F3 subcarrier frequency		9960		Hz
reference	F_{d}	F3 subcarrier deviation		480		Hz
channel	F_{c}	A3 carrier frequency	108.00		117.95	MHz
channel		carrier spacing	50		50	kHz
speed of light	C			299.79		Mm/s
radial azimuth	A	relative to magnetic north	0		359	deg

=== Variables ===
Symbols
Description	Formula	Notes
time signal left	t	center transmitter
time signal left	t_{+}(A,t)	higher frequency revolving transmitter
time signal left	t_{−}(A,t)	lower frequency revolving transmitter
signal strength	c(t)	isotropic
signal strength	g(A,t)	anisotropic
signal strength	e(A,t)	received

=== CVOR ===
Conventional VOR red(F3-) green(F3) blue(F3+) black(A3-) grey(A3) white(A3+)

The conventional signal encodes the station identifier, i(t), optional voice a(t), navigation reference signal in c(t), and the isotropic (i.e. omnidirectional) component. The reference signal is encoded on an F3 subcarrier (colour). The navigation variable signal is encoded by mechanically or electrically rotating a directional, g(A,t), antenna to produce A3 modulation (grey-scale). Receivers (paired colour and grey-scale trace) in different directions from the station paint a different alignment of F3 and A3 demodulated signal.

$$\begin{array}{rcl}
e(A,t) & = & \cos( 2 \pi F_c t ) ( 1 + c(t) + g(A,t) ) \\
c(t) & = & M_i \cos ( 2 \pi F_i t ) ~ i(t) \\
& + & M_a ~ a(t) \\
& + & M_d \cos ( 2 \pi \int_0^t ( F_s + F_d \cos ( 2 \pi F_n t ) ) dt ) \\
g(A,t) & = & M_n \cos ( 2 \pi F_n t - A ) \\
\end{array}$$

=== DVOR ===
Doppler VOR red(F3-) green(F3) blue(F3+) black(A3-) grey(A3) white (A3+) USB transmitter offset is exaggerated LSB transmitter is not shown

The doppler signal encodes the station identifier, $\ i(t)\ ,$ optional audio voice, $\ a(t)\ ,$ navigation variable signal in $\ c(t)\ ,$ and the isotropic (i.e. omnidirectional) component. The navigation variable signal is A3 modulated (greyscale). The navigation reference signal is delayed, $\ t_{+}\ , t_{-}\ ,\$ by electrically revolving a pair of transmitters. The cyclic doppler blue shift, and corresponding doppler red shift, as a transmitter closes on and recedes from the receiver results in F3 modulation (colour). The pairing of transmitters offset equally high and low of the isotropic carrier frequency produce the upper and lower sidebands. Closing and receding equally on opposite sides of the same circle around the isotropic transmitter produce F3 subcarrier modulation, $\ g(A,t) ~.$

$$\begin{array}{rcl}
t & = & t_{+}(A,t) - \frac{\ R\ }{ C }\ \sin\!\left(\ 2 \pi\ F_n\ t_{+}(A,t) + A\ \right) \\
t & = & t_{-}(A,t) + \frac{\ R\ }{ C }\ \sin\!\left(\ 2 \pi\ F_n\ t_{-}(A,t) + A\ \right) \\
\\
e(A,t) & = & \left(\ 1 + c(t)\ \right)\ \cos\!\left(\ 2 \pi\ F_c\ t\ \right) ~+~ g(A,t) \\
\\
c(t) & = & M_i \cos\!\left(\ 2 \pi\ F_i\ t\ \right)\ i(t) ~+~ M_a\ a(t) ~+~ M_n \cos\!\left(\ 2 \pi\ F_n\ t\ \right) \\
\\
g(A,t) & = & \tfrac{1}{2}\ M_d\ \cos\!\left(\ 2 \pi \left( F_c + F_s \right)\ t_{+}(A,t)\ \right)
\\
& + & \tfrac{1}{2}\ M_d\ \cos\!\left(\ 2 \pi \left( F_c - F_s \right)\ t_{-}(A,t)\ \right) \\
\end{array}$$

where the revolution radius $\ R = \frac{\ F_d\ C\ }{\ 2 \pi\ F_n\ F_c\ }\$ is 6.76 ± 0.3 m .

The transmitter acceleration $\ 4 \pi^2\ F_n^2\ R\$ (24,000 g) makes mechanical revolution impractical, and halves (gravitational redshift) the frequency change ratio compared to transmitters in free-fall.

The mathematics to describe the operation of a DVOR is far more complex than indicated above. The reference to "electronically rotated" is a vast simplification. The primary complication relates to a process that is called "blending".

Another complication is that the phase of the upper and lower sideband signals have to be locked to each other. The composite signal is detected by the receiver. The electronic operation of detection effectively shifts the carrier down to 0 Hz, folding the signals with frequencies below the Carrier, on top of the frequencies above the carrier. Thus the upper and lower sidebands are summed. If there is a phase shift between these two, then the combination will have a relative amplitude of 1 + cos φ . If φ was 180°, then the aircraft's receiver would not detect any sub-carrier (signal A3).

"Blending" describes the process by which a sideband signal is switched from one antenna to the next. The switching is not discontinuous. The amplitude of the next antenna rises as the amplitude of the current antenna falls. When one antenna reaches its peak amplitude, the next and previous antennas have zero amplitude.

By radiating from two antennas, the effective phase center becomes a point between the two. Thus the phase reference is swept continuously around the ring – not stepped as would be the case with antenna to antenna discontinuous switching.

In the electromechanical antenna switching systems employed before solid state antenna switching systems were introduced, the blending was a by-product of the way the motorized switches worked. These switches brushed a coaxial cable past 48 or 50 antenna feeds. As the cable moved between two antenna feeds, it would couple signal into both.

But blending accentuates another complication of a DVOR.

Each antenna in a DVOR uses an omnidirectional antenna. These are usually Alford Loop antennas (see Andrew Alford). Unfortunately, the sideband antennas are very close together, so that approximately 55% of the energy radiated is absorbed by the adjacent antennas. Half of that is re-radiated, and half is sent back along the antenna feeds of the adjacent antennas. The result is an antenna pattern that is no longer omnidirectional. This causes the effective sideband signal to be amplitude modulated at 60 Hz as far as the aircraft's receiver is concerned. The phase of this modulation can affect the detected phase of the sub-carrier. This effect is called "coupling".

Blending complicates this effect. It does this because when two adjacent antennas radiate a signal, they create a composite antenna.

Imagine two antennas that are separated by half their wavelength. In the transverse direction the two signals will sum, but in the tangential direction they will cancel. Thus as the signal "moves" from one antenna to the next, the distortion in the antenna pattern will increase and then decrease. The peak distortion occurs at the midpoint. This creates a half-sinusoidal 1500 Hz amplitude distortion in the case of a 50 antenna system, (1,440 Hz in a 48 antenna system). This distortion is itself amplitude modulated with a 60 Hz amplitude modulation (also some 30 Hz as well). This distortion can add or subtract with the above-mentioned 60 Hz distortion depending on the carrier phase. In fact one can add an offset to the carrier phase (relative to the sideband phases) so that the 60 Hz components tend to null one another. There is a 30 Hz component, though, which has some pernicious effects.

DVOR designs use all sorts of mechanisms to try to compensate these effects. The methods chosen are major selling points for each manufacturer, with each extolling the benefits of their technique over their rivals.

Note that ICAO Annex 10 limits the worst case amplitude modulation of the sub-carrier to 40%. A DVOR that did not employ some technique to compensate for coupling and blending effects would not meet this requirement.

=== Accuracy and reliability ===
The predicted accuracy of the VOR system is ±1.4°. However, test data indicates that 99.94% of the time a VOR system has less than ±0.35° of error. Internal monitoring of a VOR station will shut it down, or change over to a standby system if the station error exceeds some limit. A Doppler VOR beacon will typically change over or shut down when the bearing error exceeds 1.0°. National air space authorities may often set tighter limits. For instance, in Australia, a Primary Alarm limit may be set as low as ±0.5° on some Doppler VOR beacons.

ARINC 711 – 10 January 30, 2002, states that receiver accuracy should be within 0.4° with a statistical probability of 95% under various conditions. Any receiver compliant with this standard can be expected to perform within these tolerances.

All radio navigation beacons are required to monitor their own output. Most have redundant systems, so that the failure of one system will cause automatic change-over to one or more standby systems. The monitoring and redundancy requirements in some instrument landing systems (ILS) can be very strict.

The general philosophy followed is that no signal is preferable to a poor signal.

VOR beacons monitor themselves by having one or more receiving antennas located away from the beacon. The signals from these antennas are processed to monitor many aspects of the signals. The signals monitored are defined in various US and European standards. The principal standard is European Organisation for Civil Aviation Equipment (EuroCAE) Standard ED-52. The five main parameters monitored are the bearing accuracy, the reference and variable signal modulation indices, the signal level, and the presence of notches (caused by individual antenna failures).

Note that the signals received by these antennas, in a Doppler VOR beacon, are different from the signals received by an aircraft. This is because the antennas are close to the transmitter and are affected by proximity effects. For example, the free space path loss from nearby sideband antennas will be 1.5 dB different (at 113 MHz and at a distance of 80 m) from the signals received from the far side sideband antennas. For a distant aircraft there will be no measurable difference. Similarly the peak rate of phase change seen by a receiver is from the tangential antennas. For the aircraft these tangential paths will be almost parallel, but this is not the case for an antenna near the DVOR.

The bearing accuracy specification for all VOR beacons is defined in the International Civil Aviation Organization Convention on International Civil Aviation Annex 10, Volume 1.

This document sets the worst case bearing accuracy performance on a Conventional VOR (CVOR) to be ±4°. A Doppler VOR (DVOR) is required to be ±1°.

All radio-navigation beacons are checked periodically to ensure that they are performing to the appropriate International and National standards. This includes VOR beacons, distance measuring equipment (DME), instrument landing systems (ILS), and non-directional beacons (NDB).

Their performance is measured by aircraft fitted with test equipment. The VOR test procedure is to fly around the beacon in circles at defined distances and altitudes, and also along several radials. These aircraft measure signal strength, the modulation indices of the reference and variable signals, and the bearing error. They will also measure other selected parameters, as requested by local/national airspace authorities. Note that the same procedure is used (often in the same flight test) to check distance measuring equipment (DME).

In practice, bearing errors can often exceed those defined in Annex 10, in some directions. This is usually due to terrain effects, buildings near the VOR, or, in the case of a DVOR, some counterpoise effects. Note that Doppler VOR beacons utilize an elevated groundplane that is used to elevate the effective antenna pattern. It creates a strong lobe at an elevation angle of 30° which complements the 0° lobe of the antennas themselves. This groundplane is called a counterpoise. A counterpoise though, rarely works exactly as one would hope. For example, the edge of the counterpoise can absorb and re-radiate signals from the antennas, and it may tend to do this differently in some directions than others.

National air space authorities will accept these bearing errors when they occur along directions that are not the defined air traffic routes. For example, in mountainous areas, the VOR may only provide sufficient signal strength and bearing accuracy along one runway approach path.

Doppler VOR beacons are inherently more accurate than conventional VORs because they are less affected by reflections from hills and buildings. The variable signal in a DVOR is the 30 Hz FM signal; in a CVOR it is the 30 Hz AM signal. If the AM signal from a CVOR beacon bounces off a building or hill, the aircraft will see a phase that appears to be at the phase centre of the main signal and the reflected signal, and this phase center will move as the beam rotates. In a DVOR beacon, the variable signal, if reflected, will seem to be two FM signals of unequal strengths and different phases. Twice per 30 Hz cycle, the instantaneous deviation of the two signals will be the same, and the phase locked loop will get (briefly) confused. As the two instantaneous deviations drift apart again, the phase locked loop will follow the signal with the greatest strength, which will be the line-of-sight signal. If the phase separation of the two deviations is small, however, the phase locked loop will become less likely to lock on to the true signal for a larger percentage of the 30 Hz cycle (this will depend on the bandwidth of the output of the phase comparator in the aircraft). In general, some reflections can cause minor problems, but these are usually about an order of magnitude less than in a CVOR beacon.

== Using a VOR ==
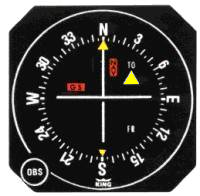
A mechanical cockpit VOR indicator

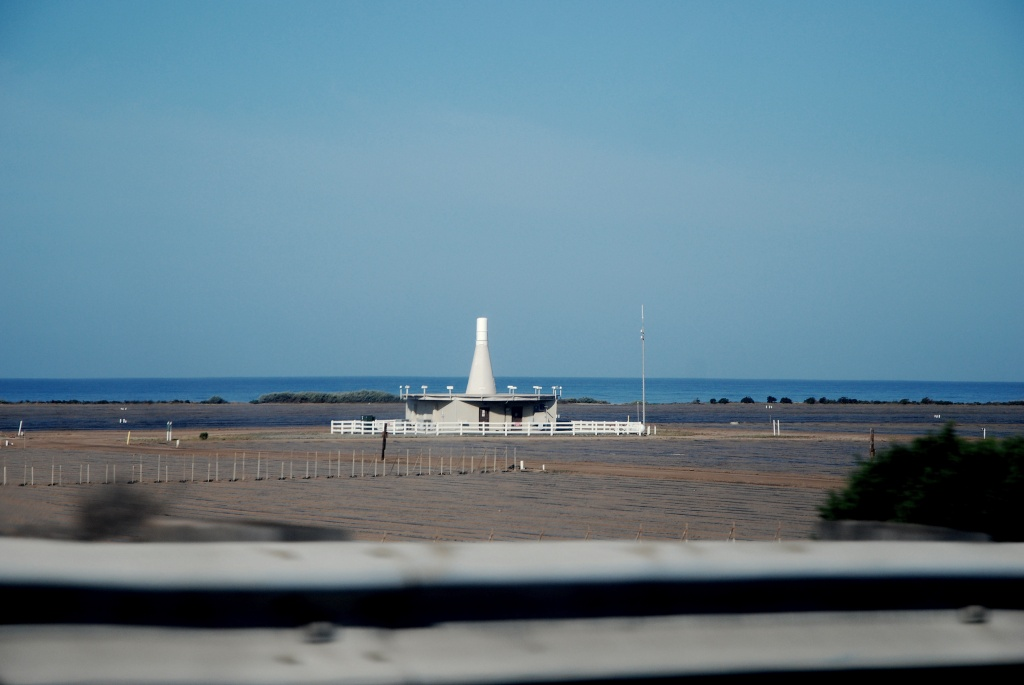
Oceanside VORTAC in California

If a pilot wants to approach the VOR station from due east then the aircraft will have to fly due west to reach the station. The pilot will use the OBS to rotate the compass dial until the number 27 (270°) aligns with the pointer (called the primary index) at the top of the dial. When the aircraft intercepts the 90° radial (due east of the VOR station) the needle will be centered and the To/From indicator will show "To". Notice that the pilot sets the VOR to indicate the reciprocal; the aircraft will follow the 90° radial while the VOR indicates that the course "to" the VOR station is 270°. This is called "proceeding inbound on the 090 radial." The pilot needs only to keep the needle centered to follow the course to the VOR station. If the needle drifts off-center the aircraft would be turned towards the needle until it is centered again. After the aircraft passes over the VOR station the To/From indicator will indicate "From" and the aircraft is then proceeding outbound on the 270° radial. The CDI needle may oscillate or go to full scale in the "cone of confusion" directly over the station but will recenter once the aircraft has flown a short distance beyond the station.

In the illustration on the right, notice that the heading ring is set with 360° (north) at the primary index, the needle is centred and the To/From indicator is showing "TO". The VOR is indicating that the aircraft is on the 360° course (north) to the VOR station (i.e. the aircraft is south of the VOR station). If the To/From indicator were showing "From" it would mean the aircraft was on the 360° radial from the VOR station (i.e. the aircraft is north of the VOR). Note that there is absolutely no indication of what direction the aircraft is flying. The aircraft could be flying due West and this snapshot of the VOR could be the moment when it crossed the 360° radial.

=== Testing ===
Before using a VOR indicator for the first time, it can be tested and calibrated at an airport with a VOR test facility, or VOT. A VOT differs from a VOR in that it replaces the variable directional signal with another omnidirectional signal, in a sense transmitting a 360° radial in all directions. The NAV receiver is tuned to the VOT frequency, then the OBS is rotated until the needle is centred. If the indicator reads within four degrees of 000 with the FROM flag visible or 180 with the TO flag visible, it is considered usable for navigation. The FAA requires testing and calibration of a VOR indicator no more than 30 days before any flight under IFR.

VOR ground receiver checkpoint marking, with the arrow pointing at the VOR facility

VORs may be checked using other methods, such as using certified airborne checkpoints and airways, certified checkpoints on the airport surface, and dual VOR receivers cross-checks.

=== Intercepting VOR radials ===
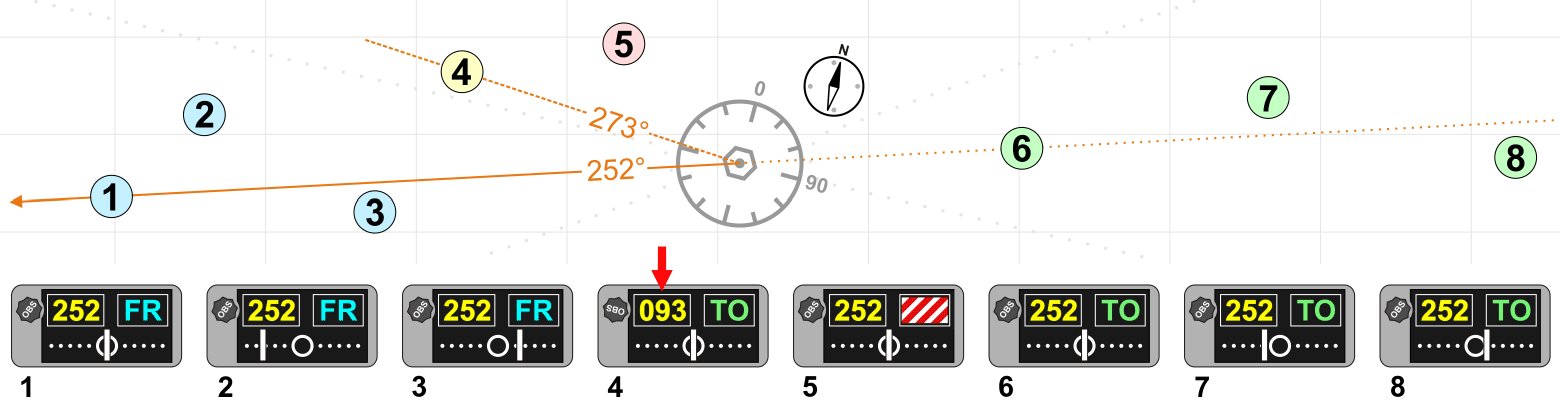
On the course deviation indicator the radial is selected, and together the needle and TO/FR flag show the aircraft's position.

There are many methods available to determine what heading to fly to intercept a radial from the station or a course to the station. The most common method involves the acronym T-I-T-P-I-T. The acronym stands for Tune – Identify – Twist – Parallel – Intercept – Track. Each of these steps are quite important to ensure the aircraft is headed where it is being directed. First, tune the desired VOR frequency into the navigation radio, second and most important, Identify the correct VOR station by verifying the Morse code heard with the sectional chart. Third, twist the VOR OBS knob to the desired radial (FROM) or course (TO) the station. Fourth, bank the aircraft until the heading indicator indicates the radial or course set in the VOR. The fifth step is to fly towards the needle. If the needle is to the left, turn left by 30–45° and vice versa. The last step is once the VOR needle is centred, turn the heading of the aircraft back to the radial or course to track down the radial or course flown. If there is wind, a wind correction angle will be necessary to maintain the VOR needle centred.

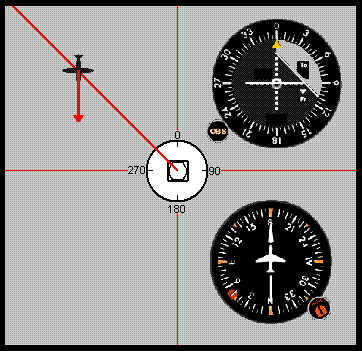
Aircraft in NW quadrant with VOR indicator shading heading from 360 to 090 degrees

Another method to intercept a VOR radial exists and more closely aligns itself with the operation of an HSI (Horizontal Situation Indicator). The first three steps above are the same; tune, identify and twist. At this point, the VOR needle should be displaced to either the left or the right. Looking at the VOR indicator, the numbers on the same side as the needle will always be the headings needed to return the needle back to centre. The aircraft heading should then be turned to align itself with one of those shaded headings. If done properly, this method will never produce reverse sensing. Using this method will ensure quick understanding of how an HSI works as the HSI visually shows what we are mentally trying to do.

In the adjacent diagram, an aircraft is flying a heading of 180° while located at a bearing of 315° from the VOR. After twisting the OBS knob to 360°, the needle deflects to the right. The needle shades the numbers between 360 and 090. If the aircraft turns to a heading anywhere in this range, the aircraft will intercept the radial. Although the needle deflects to the right, the shortest way of turning to the shaded range is a turn to the left.

== See also ==
- Index of aviation articles
- Airway (aviation)
- Direction finding (DF)
- Distance measuring equipment (DME)
- Global Positioning System (GPS)
- Head-up display (HUD)
- Instrument flight rules (IFR)
- Instrument landing system (ILS)
- Non-directional beacon (NDB)
- Performance-based navigation
- TACAN
- Transponder landing system (TLS)
- Victor airways
- Wide Area Augmentation System (WAAS)
