= Victor airways =

Low altitude flight corridors in Canada and the United States

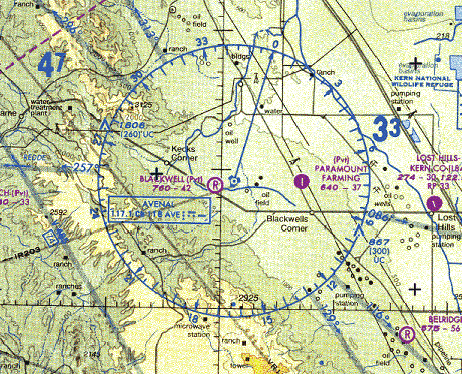
The VOR station shown on this chart has airways shown at bearings of 086, 116, 129, 257, 296, and 313. Another airway emanating from a different station also crosses the south-west corner of the map.

In the United States and Canada, Victor airways are low-altitude airways. They are defined in straight-line segments, each of which is based on a straight line between either two VHF omnidirectional range (VOR) stations, or a VOR and a VOR intersection, hence the beginning letter V (pronounced as Victor in the ICAO phonetic alphabet).

== United States ==
In the United States, Victor airways are designated by the FAA in FAA Order JO 7400.11. They are available for flight up to, but not including, 18,000ft MSL (above mean sea level) under either instrument flight rules (IFR) or visual flight rules (VFR).

Victor airways have minimum (and possibly maximum) altitudes for IFR operations established. For VFR operations, victor airways are just a subset of so-called Federal airways (which also include so-called colored airways), which are designated as Class E, and hence are extended from 1,200 feet (370 m) above ground level (AGL) up to, but not including, 18,000 feet (5,500 m) above mean sea level (AMSL).

Victor airways are depicted as black solid lines on IFR Low-Altitude Enroute charts and as thick faded blue lines on VFR Terminal and Sectional Area charts. They are identified by a number, similar to an interstate highway (for example, a pilot could say that he/she is "flying Victor Eight").

The width of the victor corridor depends on the distance from the navigational aids (such as VORs):

- When VORs are less than 102 nautical miles (NM) (189 km) from each other, the airway extends 4 NM (7.4 km) on either side of the centerline (8 NM (14.8 km) total width).
- When VORs are more than 102 NM from each other, the width of the airway in the middle increases to account for the increased margin of error in the VOR signal. The width of the airway beyond 51 NM from a navaid is 4.5 degrees on either side of the centerline (at 51 NM from a navaid, 4.5 degrees from the centerline of a radial is equivalent to 4 NM). The maximum width of the airway is at a designated changeover point between the two navaids, usually half way.

== Canada ==
Controlled low-level airways extend upwards from 2,200 ft AGL up to, but not including 18,000 ft ASL.

=== VHF/UHF airways ===
The basic VHF/UHF airway width is at least 4 NM on each side of the centerline prescribed for such an airway, and is expanded along a line diverging 4.5° on each side of the centerline from the designated facility.

=== LF/MF airways ===
The basic LF/MF airway width is at least 4.34 NM on each side of the centerline prescribed for such an airway, and is expanded along a line diverging 5° on each side of the centerline from the designated facility.

=== Mixed airways ===
Where a Victor airway is established based on a VOR/VORTAC and NDB, the boundaries of that airway will be those of an LF/MF airway.

=== T-routes ===
Low-level controlled fixed RNAV routes have dimensions of 4 NM of primary obstacle protection area, plus 2 NM of secondary obstacle protection area on each side of the centreline. The airspace associated with RNAV T-routes is 10 NM on each side of the centreline. RNAV T-route airspace and protection areas do not splay with distance from the waypoint.

== External references ==
- FAA Order JO 7400.2L, Procedures for Handling Airspace Matters (PDF). FAA. (cited as 7400.2)
- FAA Order JO 7400.11B, Airspace Designations and Reporting Points (PDF). FAA. (cited as 7400.11)
- FAA Order 8260.3C, United States Standard for Terminal Instrument Procedures (TERPS) (PDF). FAA. (cited as TERPS)
- FAA Order 8260.19H, Flight Procedures and Airspace (PDF). FAA. (cited as 8260.19)
- Pilot's Handbook of Aeronautical Knowledge. FAA. 2016. (cited as PHAK)
