= Non-directional beacon =

Radio transmitter which emits radio waves in all directions

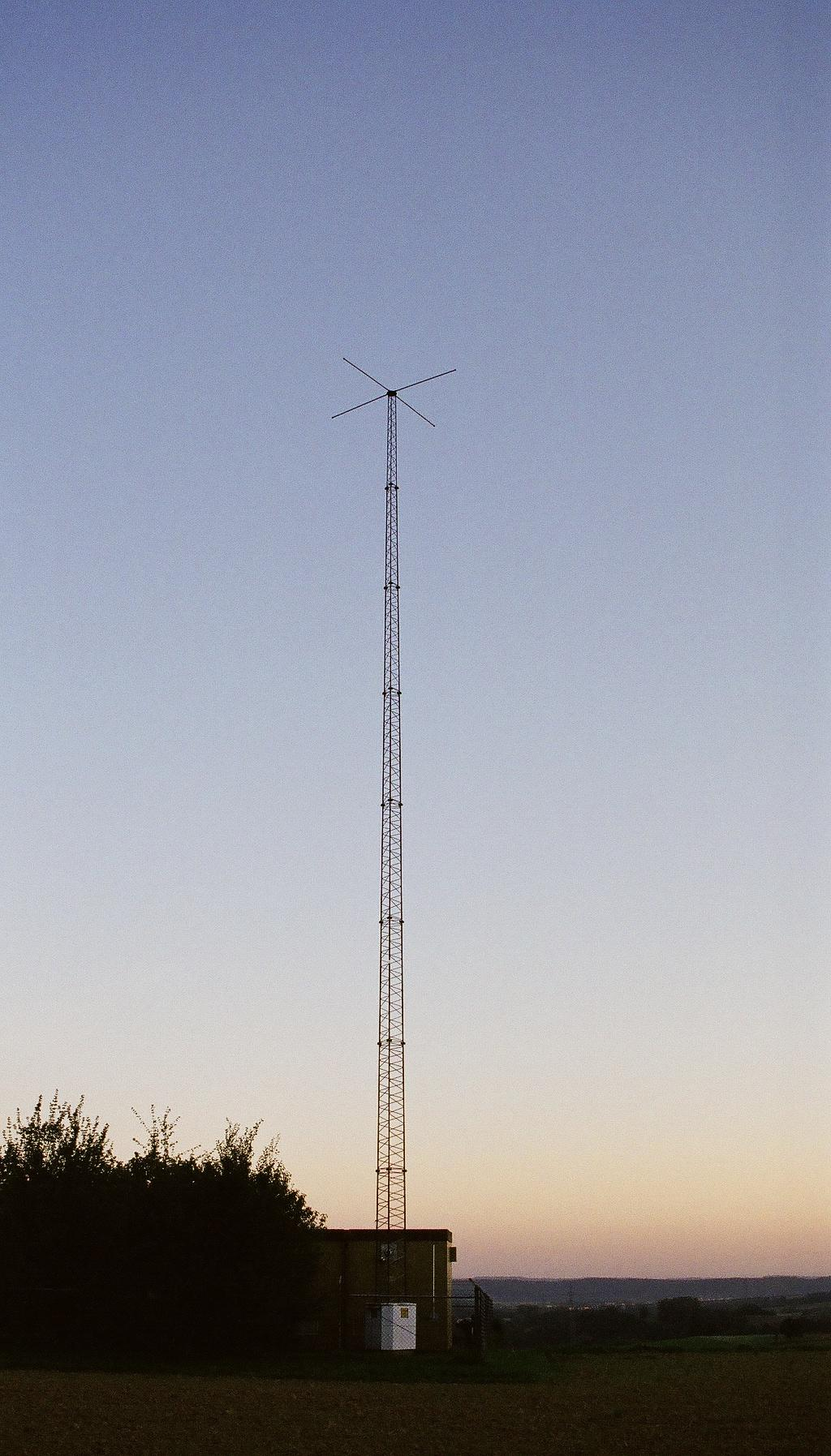
Radio tower of NKR Leimen-Ochsenbach, Germany

This symbol denotes an NDB on an aeronautical chart. A hollow square superimposed on this symbol indicates a collocated distance measuring equipment (DME) installation.

A non-directional beacon (NDB) or non-directional radio beacon is a radio beacon which does not include inherent directional information. Radio beacons are radio transmitters at a known location, used as an aviation or marine navigational aid. NDB are in contrast to directional radio beacons and other navigational aids, such as low-frequency radio range, VHF omnidirectional range (VOR) and tactical air navigation system (TACAN).

NDB signals follow the curvature of the Earth, so they can be received at much greater distances at lower altitudes, a major advantage over VOR. However, NDB signals are also affected more by atmospheric conditions, mountainous terrain, coastal refraction and electrical storms, particularly at long range. The system, developed by United States Army Air Corps (USAAC) Captain Albert Francis Hegenberger, was used to fly the world's first instrument approach on May 9, 1932.

== Types of NDBs ==
NDBs used for aviation are standardised by the International Civil Aviation Organization (ICAO) Annex 10 which specifies that NDBs be operated on a frequency between 190 kHz and 1750 kHz, although normally all NDBs in North America operate between 190 kHz and 535 kHz. Each NDB is identified by a one, two, or three-letter Morse code callsign. In Canada, privately owned NDB identifiers consist of one letter and one number.

Non-directional beacons in North America are classified by power output: "low" power rating is less than 50 watts; "medium" from 50 W to 2,000 W; and "high" at more than 2,000 W.

There are four types of non-directional beacons in the aeronautical navigation service:

- En route NDBs, used to mark airways
- Approach NDBs
- Localizer beacons
- Locator beacons

The last two types are used in conjunction with an instrument landing system (ILS).

== Automatic direction finder equipment ==
Automatic direction finder (ADF) equipment points to the direction of an NDB.

NDB navigation consists of two parts — the automatic direction finder (ADF) equipment on the aircraft that detects an NDB's signal, and the NDB transmitter. The ADF can also locate transmitters in the standard AM medium wave broadcast band (530 kHz to 1700 kHz at 10 kHz increments in the Americas (Note: Frequencies in this band are not authorized for navigation. NDB stations do not continuously identify themselves, and these waves are more likely to be subject to skywave propagation, especially during the night time.), 531 kHz to 1602 kHz at 9 kHz increments in the rest of the world).

ADF equipment determines the direction or bearing to the NDB station relative to the aircraft by using a combination of directional and non-directional antennae to sense the direction in which the combined signal is strongest. This bearing may be displayed on a relative bearing indicator (RBI). This display looks like a compass card with a needle superimposed, except that the card is fixed with the 0 degree position corresponding to the centreline of the aircraft. In order to track toward an NDB (with no wind), the aircraft is flown so that the needle points to the 0 degree position. The aircraft will then fly directly to the NDB. Similarly, the aircraft will track directly away from the NDB if the needle is maintained on the 180 degree mark. With a crosswind, the needle must be maintained to the left or right of the 0 or 180 position by an amount corresponding to the drift due to the crosswind.

The formula to determine the compass heading to an NDB station (in a no wind situation) is to take the relative bearing between the aircraft and the station, and add the magnetic heading of the aircraft; if the total is greater than 360 degrees, then 360 must be subtracted. This gives the magnetic bearing that must be flown: (RB + MH) mod 360 = MB.

When tracking to or from an NDB, it is also usual that the aircraft track on a specific bearing. To do this it is necessary to correlate the RBI reading with the compass heading. Having determined the drift, the aircraft must be flown so that the compass heading is the required bearing adjusted for drift at the same time as the RBI reading is 0 or 180 adjusted for drift. An NDB may also be used to locate a position along the aircraft's current track (such as a radial path from a second NDB or a VOR). When the needle reaches an RBI reading corresponding to the required bearing, then the aircraft is at the position. However, using a separate RBI and compass, this requires considerable mental calculation to determine the appropriate relative bearing.

To simplify this task, a compass card driven by the aircraft's magnetic compass is added to the RBI to form a radio magnetic indicator (RMI). The ADF needle is then referenced immediately to the aircraft's magnetic heading, which reduces the necessity for mental calculation. Many RMIs used for aviation also allow the device to display information from a second radio tuned to a VOR station; the aircraft can then fly directly between VOR stations (so-called "Victor" routes) while using the NDBs to triangulate their position along the radial, without the need for the VOR station to have a collocated distance measuring equipment (DME). This display, along with the omni bearing indicator (OBI) for VOR/ILS information, was one of the primary radio navigation instruments prior to the introduction of the horizontal situation indicator (HSI) and subsequent digital displays used in glass cockpits.

The principles of ADFs are not limited to NDB usage; such systems are also used to detect the locations of broadcast signals for many other purposes, such as finding emergency beacons.

== Uses ==
=== Airways ===
NDB transmitter at 49°12′21″N 002°13′12″W Callsign JW – 'Jersey West'. 329.0 kHz.

A bearing is a line passing through the station that points in a specific direction, such as 270 degrees (due west). NDB bearings provide a charted, consistent method for defining paths aircraft can fly. In this fashion, NDBs can, like VORs, define airways in the sky. Aircraft follow these pre-defined routes to complete a flight plan. Airways are numbered and standardized on charts. Colored airways are used for low to medium frequency stations like the NDB and are charted in brown on sectional charts. Green and red airways are plotted east and west, while amber and blue airways are plotted north and south. As of September 2022, only one colored airway is left in the continental United States, located off the coast of North Carolina and is called G13 or Green 13. Alaska is the only other state in the United States to make use of the colored airway systems. Pilots follow these routes by tracking bearings across various navigation stations, and turning at some. While most airways in the United States are based on VORs, NDB airways are common elsewhere, especially in the developing world and in lightly populated areas of developed countries, like the Canadian Arctic, since they can have a long range and are much less expensive to operate than VORs.

All standard airways are plotted on aeronautical charts, such as the United States sectional charts, issued by the National Oceanic and Atmospheric Administration (NOAA).

=== Fixes ===
NDBs have long been used by aircraft navigators, and previously mariners, to help obtain a fix of their geographic location on the surface of the Earth. Fixes are computed by extending lines through known navigational reference points until they intersect. For visual reference points, the angles of these lines can be determined by compass; the bearings of NDB radio signals are found using radio direction finder (RDF) equipment.

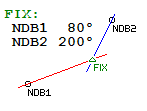
Airspace Fix Diagram

Plotting fixes in this manner allow crews to determine their position. This usage is important in situations where other navigational equipment, such as VORs with distance measuring equipment (DME), have failed. In marine navigation, NDBs may still be useful should Global Positioning System (GPS) reception fail.

=== Determining distance from an NDB station ===
To determine the distance to an NDB station, the pilot uses this method:

1. Turns the aircraft so that the station is directly off one of the wingtips.
2. Flies that heading, timing how long it takes to cross a specific number of NDB bearings.
3. Uses the formula: Time to station = 60 × number of minutes flown / degrees of bearing change
4. Computes the distance the aircraft is from the station; time × speed = distance

=== NDB approaches ===
A runway equipped with NDB or VOR (or both) as the only navigation aid is called a non-precision approach runway; if it is equipped with ILS, it is called a precision approach runway.

=== Instrument landing systems ===
NDBs are most commonly used as markers or "locators" for an instrument landing system (ILS) approach or standard approach. NDBs may designate the starting area for an ILS approach or a path to follow for a standard terminal arrival route, or STAR. In the United States, an NDB is often combined with the outer marker beacon in the ILS approach (called a locator outer marker, or LOM); in Canada, low-powered NDBs have replaced marker beacons entirely. Marker beacons on ILS approaches are now being phased out worldwide with DME ranges or GPS signals used, instead, to delineate the different segments of the approach.

=== Naval operational uses ===
German Navy U-boats during World War II were equipped with a Telefunken Spez 2113S homing beacon. This transmitter could operate on 100 kHz to 1500 kHz with a power of 150 W. It was used to send the submarine's location to other submarines or aircraft, which were equipped with DF receivers and loop antennas.

== Antenna and signal characteristics ==
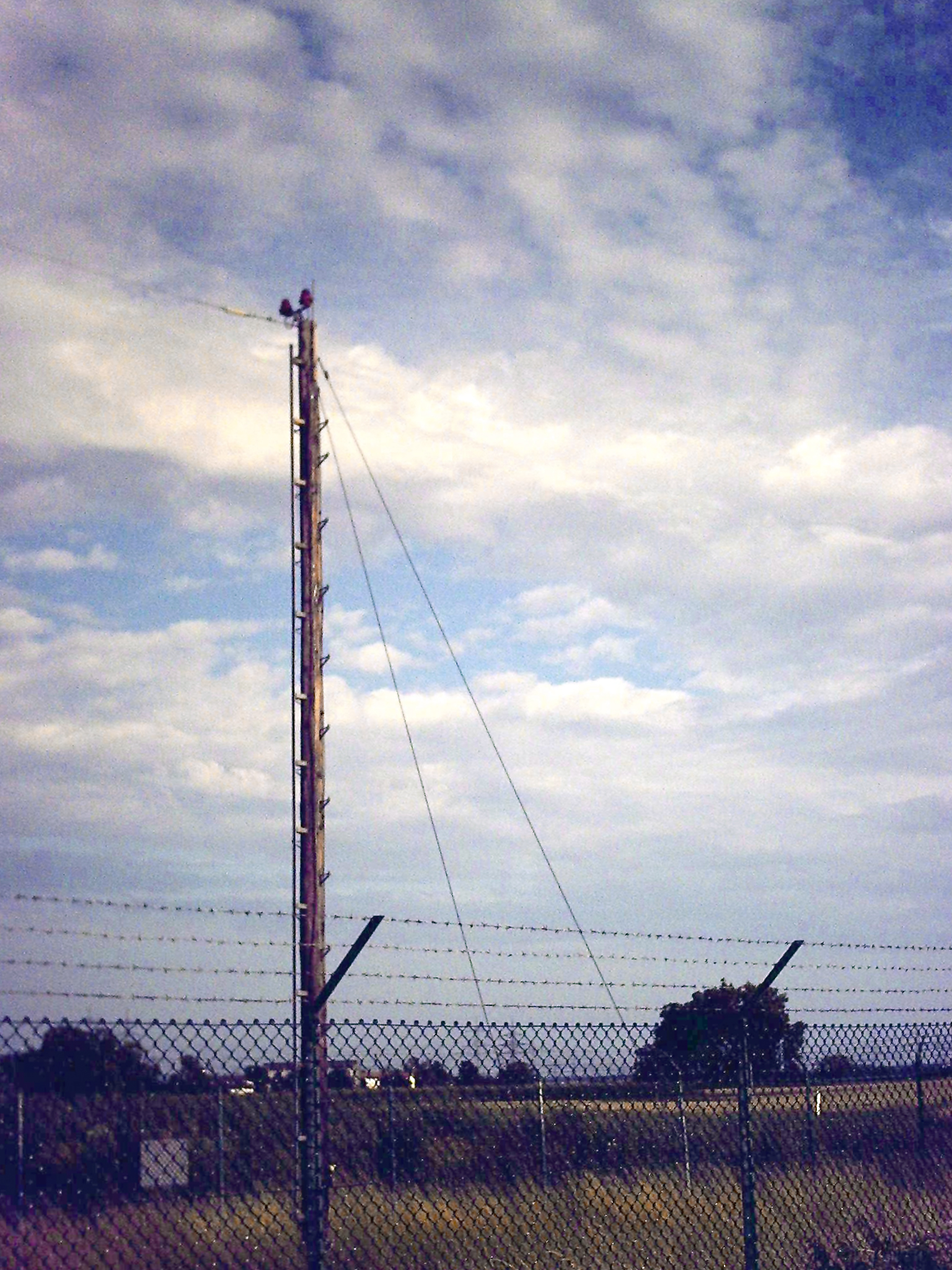
One of the wooden poles of NDB HDL at Plankstadt, Germany

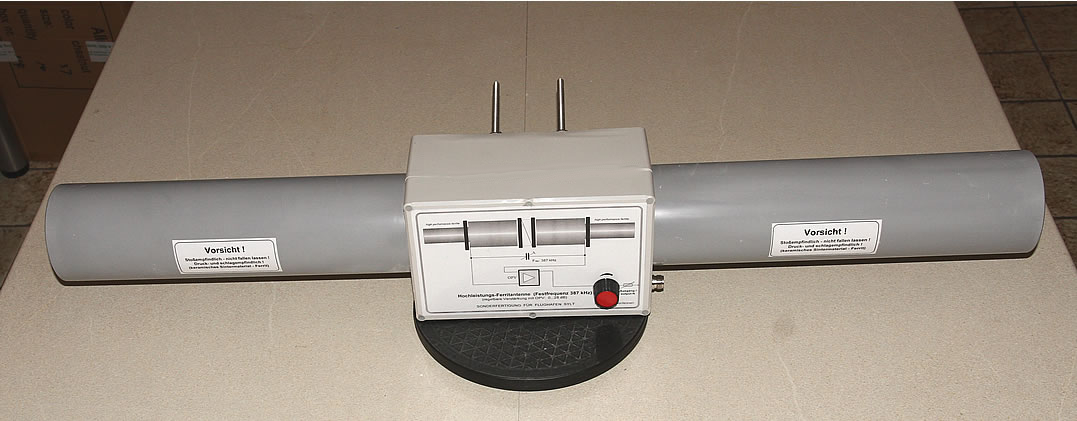
Ferrite antenna for non-directional beacon (NDB), frequency range 255–526.5 kHz

NDBs typically operate in the frequency range from 190 kHz to 535 kHz (although they are allocated frequencies from 190 to 1750 kHz) and transmit a carrier modulated by either 400 or 1020 Hz. NDBs can also be collocated with a DME in a similar installation for the ILS as the outer marker, only in this case, they function as the inner marker. NDB owners are mostly governmental agencies and airport authorities.

NDB radiators are vertically polarised. NDB antennas are usually too short for resonance at the frequency they operate – typically perhaps 20 metres length compared to a wavelength around 1000 m. Therefore, they require a suitable matching network that may consist of an inductor and a capacitor to "tune" the antenna. Vertical NDB antennas may also have a T-antenna, nicknamed a top hat, which is an umbrella-like structure designed to add loading at the end and improve its radiating efficiency. Usually a ground plane or counterpoise is connected underneath the antenna.

=== Other information transmitted by an NDB ===
The sound of non directional beacon WG, on 248 kHz, located at 49°53′57.12″N 97°20′57.11″W, near Winnipeg's main airport

Apart from Morse code identity of either 400 Hz or 1020 Hz, the NDB may broadcast:

- Automatic terminal information service (ATIS)
- Automatic weather information service (AWIS), or, in an emergency i.e. air-to-ground communication failure, an air traffic controller using a push-to-talk (PTT) function, may modulate the carrier with voice. The pilot uses their ADF receiver to hear instructions from the control tower.
- Automated weather observing system (AWOS)
- Automated surface observing system (ASOS)
- VOLMET (meteorological information for aircraft in flight) or meteorological information broadcast
- Transcribed weather broadcast (TWEB)
- PIP monitoring. If an NDB has a problem, e.g. lower than normal power output, failure of mains power or standby transmitter is in operation, the NDB may be programmed to transmit an extra 'PIP' (a Morse dot), to alert pilots and others that the beacon may be unreliable for navigation.

== Common adverse effects ==
Navigation using an ADF to track NDBs is subject to several common effects:

Night effect
Radio waves reflected back by the ionosphere can cause signal strength fluctuations 30 to 60 NM (56 to 111 km; 35 to 69 mi) from the transmitter, especially just before sunrise and just after sunset. This is more common on frequencies above 350 kHz. Because the returning sky waves travel over a different path, they have a different phase from the ground wave. This has the effect of suppressing the aerial signal in a fairly random manner. The needle on the indicator will start wandering. The indication will be most erratic during twilight at dusk and dawn.
Terrain effect
High terrain like mountains and cliffs can reflect radio waves, giving erroneous readings. Magnetic deposits can also cause erroneous readings
Thunderstorm effect
Water droplets and ice crystals circulating within a storm cloud, generate wideband noise. This high power noise may affect the accuracy of the ADF bearing. Lightning, due to the high power output will cause the needle of the RMI/RBI to point for a moment to the bearing of the lightning.
Shoreline effect
Radio waves speed up over water, causing the wave front to bend away from its normal path and pull it towards the coast. Refraction is negligible perpendicular (90°) to the coast, but increases as the angle of incidence decreases. The effect can be minimised by flying higher or by using NDBs situated nearer the coast.
Station interference
Due to congestion of stations in the LF and MF bands, there is the possibility of interference from stations on or near the same frequency. This will cause bearing errors. By day, the use of an NDB within the DOC will normally afford protection from interference. However, at night one can expect interference even within the DOC because of skywave contamination from stations out of range by day. Therefore, positive identification of the NDB at night should always be carried out.
Dip (bank) angle
During banking turns in an aircraft, the horizontal part of the loop aerial will no longer be horizontal and detect a signal. This causes displacement of the null in a way similar to the night effect giving an erroneous reading on the indicator which means that the pilot should not obtain a bearing unless the aircraft is wings-level.

While pilots study these effects during initial training, trying to compensate for them in flight is very difficult; instead, pilots generally simply choose a heading that seems to average out any fluctuations.

Radio-navigation aids must keep a certain degree of accuracy, given by international standards, Federal Aviation Administration (FAA), ICAO, etc.; to assure this is the case, Flight inspection organizations periodically check critical parameters with properly equipped aircraft to calibrate and certify NDB precision. The ICAO minimum accuracy for NDBs is ±5°

== Monitoring NDBs ==
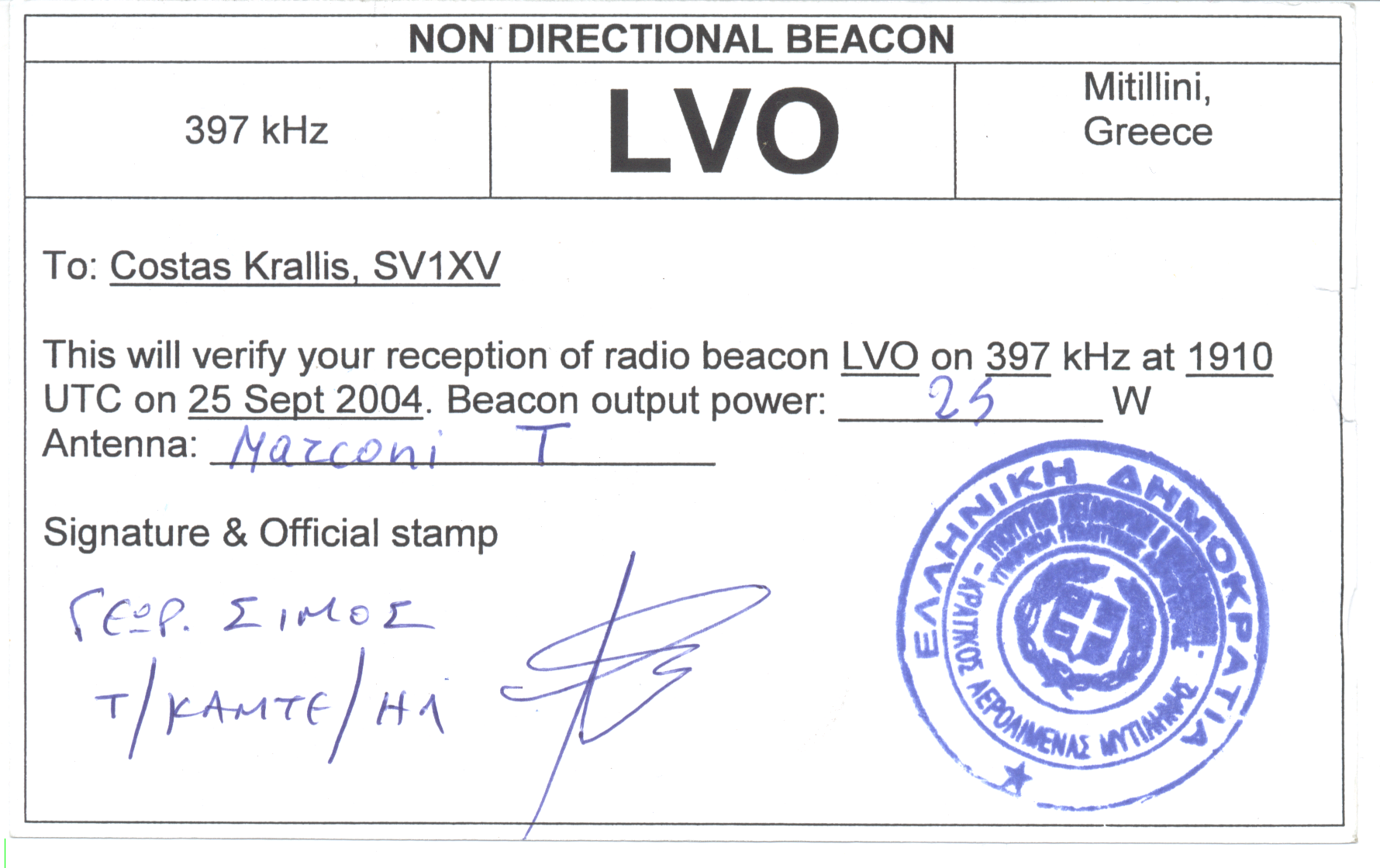
A PFC QSL card from an NDB

Besides their use in aircraft navigation, NDBs are also popular with long-distance radio enthusiasts (DXers). Because NDBs are generally low-power (usually 25 watts, some can be up to 5 kW), they normally cannot be heard over long distances, but favorable conditions in the ionosphere can allow NDB signals to travel much farther than normal. Because of this, radio DXers interested in picking up distant signals enjoy listening to faraway NDBs. Also, since the band allocated to NDBs is free of broadcast stations and their associated interference, and because most NDBs do little more than transmit their Morse code callsign, they are very easy to identify, making NDB monitoring an active niche within the DXing hobby.

In North America, the NDB band is from 190 to 435 kHz and from 510 to 530 kHz. In Europe, there is a longwave broadcasting band from 150 to 280 kHz, so the European NDB band is from 280 kHz to 530 kHz with a gap between 495 and 505 kHz because 500 kHz was the international maritime distress (emergency) frequency.

The beacons that transmit between 510 kHz and 530 kHz can sometimes be heard on AM radios that can tune below the beginning of the medium wave (MW) broadcast band. However, reception of NDBs generally requires a radio receiver that can receive frequencies below 530 kHz. Often "general coverage" shortwave radios receive all frequencies from 150 kHz to 30 MHz, and so can tune to the frequencies of NDBs. Specialized techniques (receiver preselectors, noise limiters and filters) are required for the reception of very weak signals from remote beacons.

The best time to hear NDBs that are very far away is the last three hours before sunrise. Reception of NDBs is also usually best during the fall and winter because during the spring and summer, there is more atmospheric noise on the LF and MF bands.

== Beacon closures ==
As the adoption of satellite navigation systems such as GPS progressed, several countries began to decommission beacon installations such as NDBs and VOR. The policy has caused controversy in the aviation industry.

Airservices Australia began shutting down a number of ground-based navigation aids in May 2016, including NDBs, VORs and DMEs.

In the United States as of 2017, there were more than 1,300 NDBs, of which fewer than 300 were owned by the Federal Government. The FAA had begun decommissioning stand-alone NDBs. As of April 2018, the FAA had disabled 23 ground-based navaids including NDBs, and plans to shut down more than 300 by 2025. The FAA has no sustaining or acquisition system for NDBs and plans to phase out the existing NDBs through attrition, citing decreased pilot reliance on NDBs as more pilots use VOR and GPS navigation.

== See also ==
- Cardioid
- Differential Global Positioning System (DGPS)
- Electric beacon
- Instrument flight rules (IFR)
- Transponder landing system (TLS)
