= Horizontal situation indicator =

Aircraft heading flight instrument

Illustration of the face of a horizontal situation indicator showing the key elements of the display

The horizontal situation indicator (commonly called the HSI) is an aircraft flight instrument normally mounted below the artificial horizon in place of a conventional heading indicator. It combines a heading indicator with a VHF omnidirectional range-instrument landing system (VOR-ILS) display.

== Advantage ==
The HSI can reduce pilot workload by lessening the number of elements in the pilot's instrument scan to the six basic flight instruments. Among other advantages, the HSI offers freedom from the confusion of reverse sensing on an instrument landing system localizer back course approach. As long as the needle is set to the localizer front course, the instrument will indicate whether to fly left or right, in either direction of travel.

== Display ==
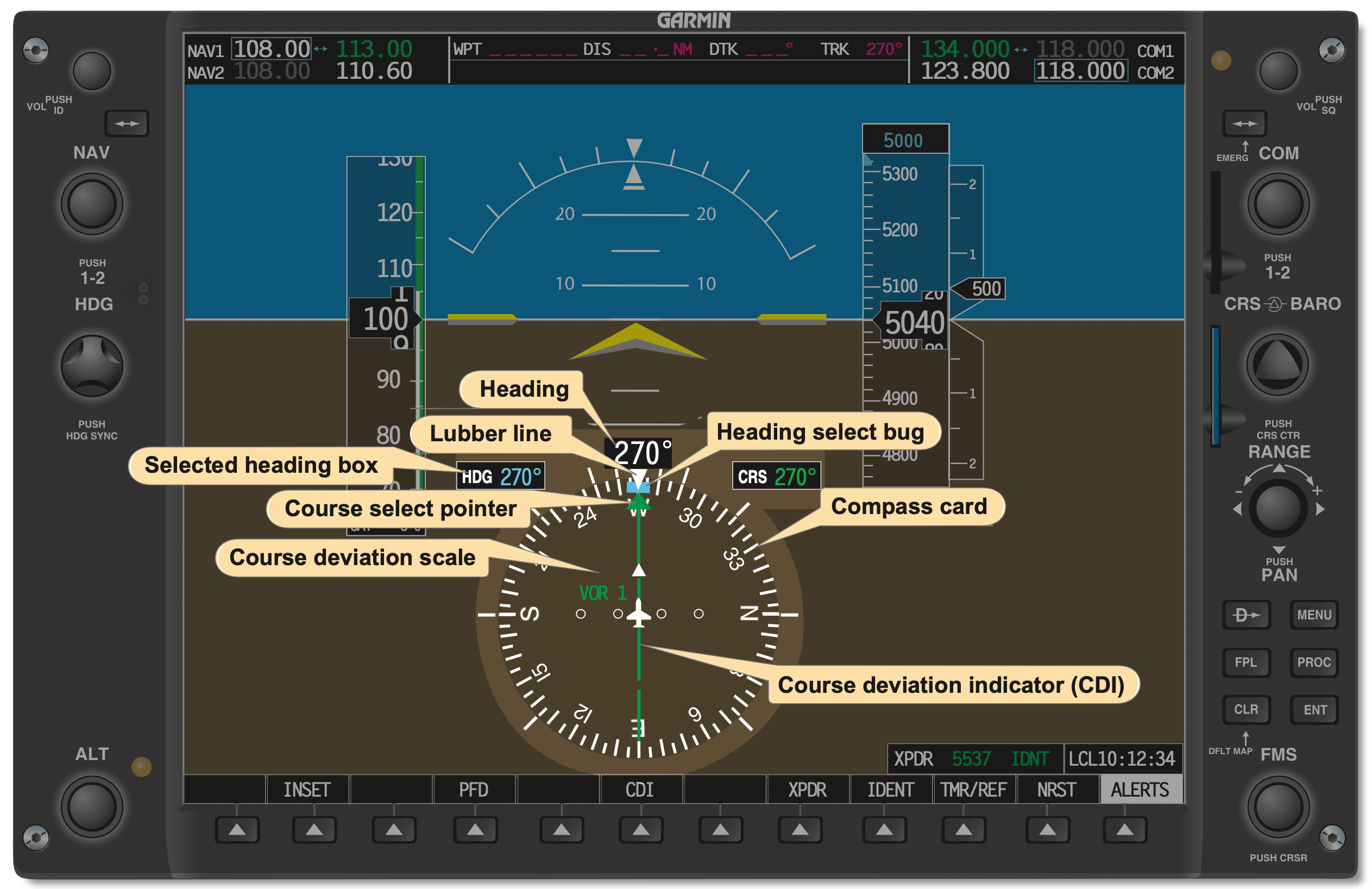
An electronic HSI on a primary flight display

On the HSI, the aircraft is represented by a schematic figure in the centre of the instrument – the VOR-ILS display is shown in relation to this figure. The heading indicator is usually slaved to a remote compass and the HSI is frequently interconnected with an autopilot capable of following the heading select bug and of executing an ILS approach by following the localizer and glide slope.

On a conventional VOR indicator, left–right and to–from must be interpreted in the context of the selected course. When an HSI is tuned to a VOR station, left and right always mean left and right and TO/FROM is indicated by a simple triangular arrowhead pointing to the VOR. If the arrowhead points to the same side as the course selector arrow, it means TO, and if it points behind to the side opposite the course selector, it means FROM. The HSI illustrated here is a type designed for smaller airplanes and is the size of a standard 3 ¼-inch instrument. Airline and jet aircraft HSIs are larger and may include more display elements.

The most modern HSI displays are electronic and often integrated with electronic flight instrument systems into so-called "glass cockpit" systems.

== Remote indicating compass ==
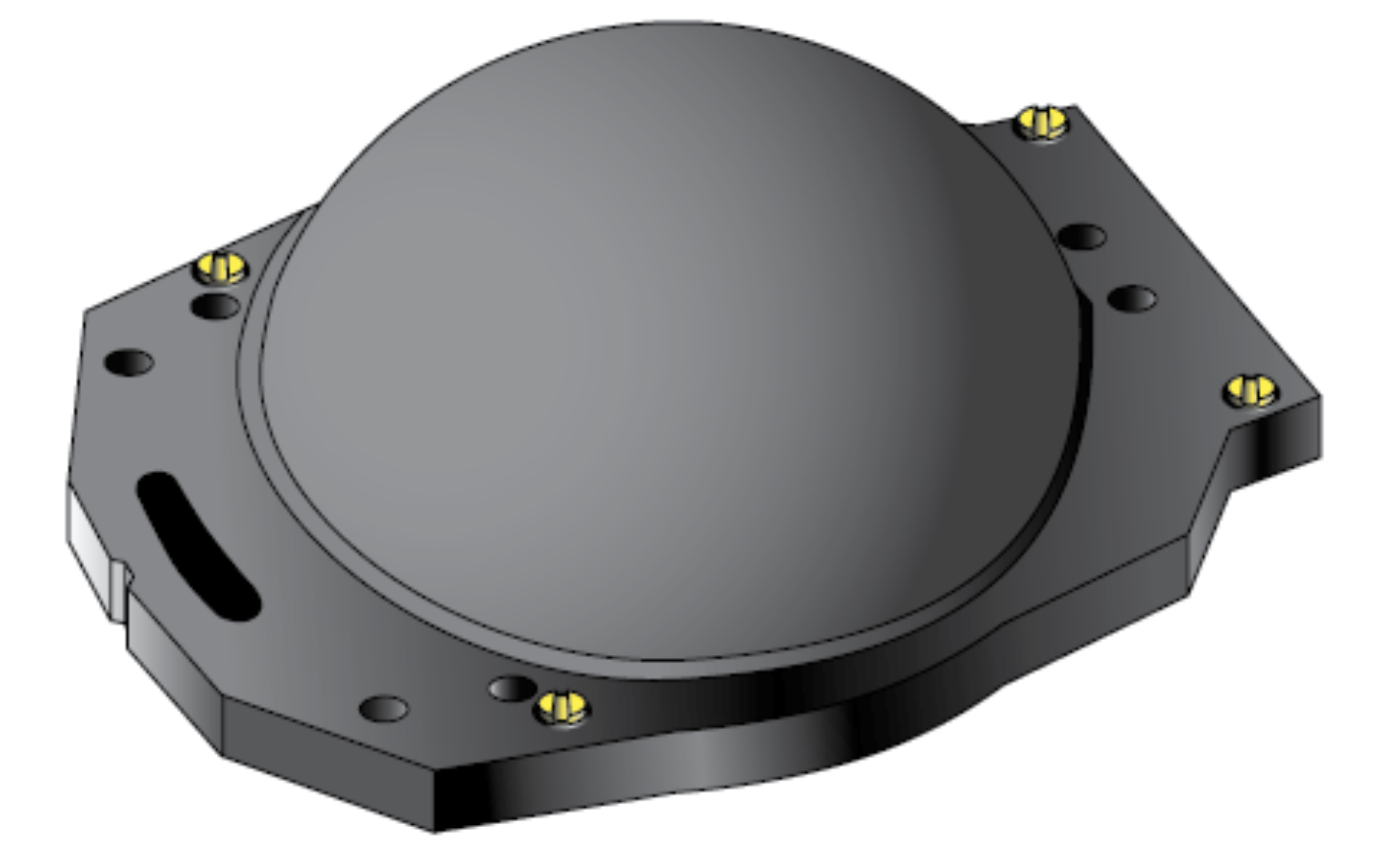
A magnetic slaving transmitter in a remote indicating compass detects the magnetic field of the Earth via a fluxgate magnetometer.

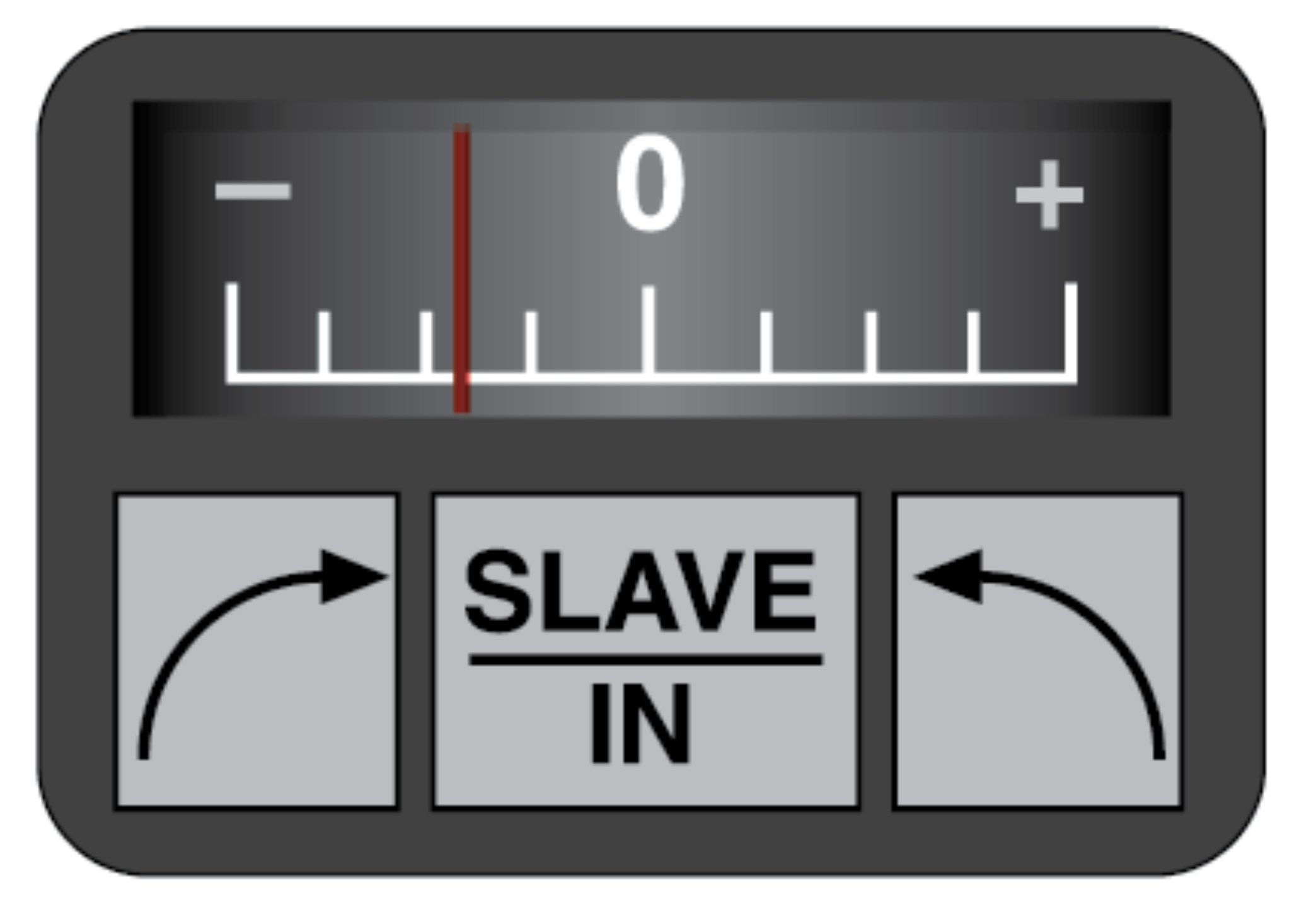
A slaving control and compensator unit evaluates the data from the slaving transmitter and corrects the heading in HSI when the "slave gyro" mode is enabled.

HSI is part of a remote indicating compass system, which was developed to compensate for the errors and limitations of the older type of heading indicators. The two panel-mounted components of a typical system include the HSI and a slaving control and compensator unit, which pilots can set to auto-correct the gyro error using readings from a remotely mounted magnetic slaving transmitter when the system is set to "slave gyro" mode. In a "free gyro" mode, pilots have to manually adjust their HSI.

== See also ==
- Acronyms and abbreviations in avionics
- Flight instruments
- Radio magnetic indicator
