= Airway (aviation) =

Designated route along which aircraft travel between airports

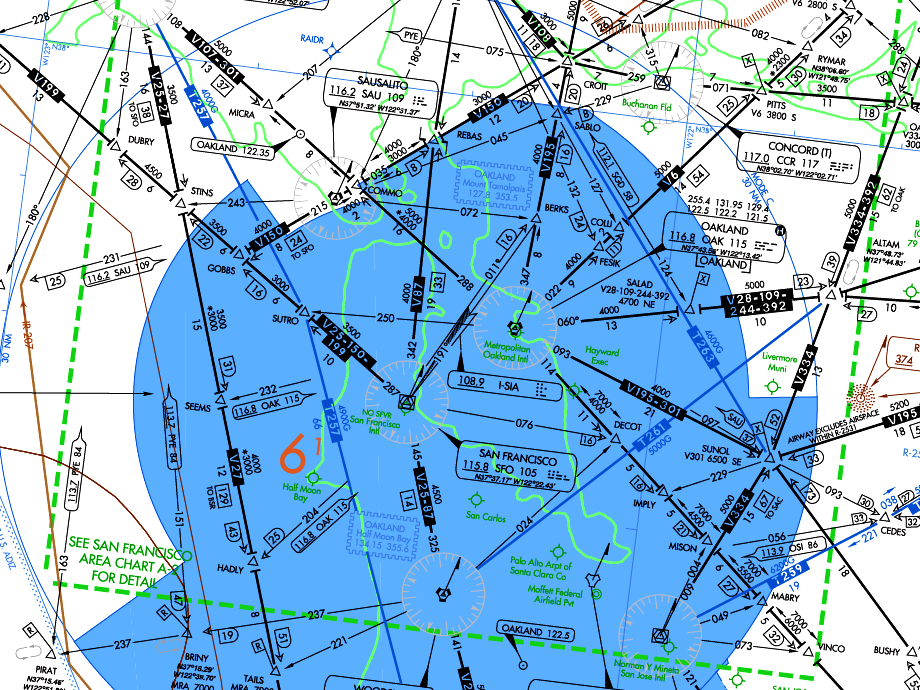
This instrument flight rules chart shows low-altitude airways in the Oakland Area Control Center (near San Francisco, California).

Airways, air routes or flight paths are designated routes that aeroplanes fly to aid in navigation and help with separation to avoid accidents. (Note: The term airway is used by aviation professionals including the International Civil Aviation Organization (ICAO), but other terms have been used or misused by non-specialist sources, sometimes to mean the same thing.)

Airways are defined with segments within a specific altitude block, corridor width, and between fixed geographic coordinates for satellite navigation system, or between ground-based radio transmitter navigational aids (navaids; such as VORs or NDBs) or the intersection of specific radials of two navaids.

== United States ==
In the United States, airways are defined by the Federal Aviation Administration (FAA) in two ways:

"VOR Federal airways and Low/Medium Frequency (L/MF) (Colored) Federal airways"

=== History ===
To guide airmail pilots on their delivery routes, the United States Postal Service constructed the first airways in the United States, the Contract Air Mail routes. These airways were between major cities and identified at night by a series of flashing lights and beacons which pilots flew over in sequence to get from one city to the next. Intermediate fields were located every 30 miles (48 km) in case of emergencies, with at least two landing strips a minimum of 2,000 feet (610 m) in length, and 600 feet (180 m) in width. Rotating airway beacons were erected every 10 miles (16 km). However, these visual airways required the pilots to be in visual contact with the ground, which precluded flying in fog or clouds. Subsequently, the Department of Commerce funded the development of other means of airway navigation.

The first airways delineated by radio frequency were based on the old Low-frequency radio range also called the "Four Course Radio Range" or "A/N" system. The pilot listened for the stronger of the Morse code transmitters ("· –" for "A" and "– ·" for "N", indicating left or right of the course); the objective was to be centered on course hearing a steady tone (the A and N Morse codes merge to form a steady tone when the receiver is equidistant from both transmitters).

Later airways were based on low/medium frequency ground stations, like the beat frequency oscillator (BFO) and the non-directional beacon (NDB). These L/M frequency airways were the colored airways. Colored airways still exist, mostly in Alaska. There are only a few colored airways remaining in the contiguous United States. There is one colored airway on the coast of North Carolina called G13 (Green 13). There is one Canadian colored airway designated A16 (Amber 16) that transits through US airspace in northwestern Washington State and is visible on the Seattle sectional chart. Additionally, there are several colored airways connecting to, and transitioning through, the Florida Keys. B9 (Blue 9) connects the Southern Florida mainland to Marathon Key. B646 (Blue 646) connects Mérida, Mexico to Nassau, Bahamas and transitions through the Florida Keys. A portion of B646 connects Key West to Marathon Key and serves as a bypass for aircraft unable to meet the 15,000-foot minimum altitude along that portion of V3. Finally, G765 (Green 765) connects Key West to Cozumel, Mexico. Colored airways are all depicted in brown on low and high altitude charts produced by the FAA's Aeronautical Navigation Products.

=== Boundary ===
Federal airways is defined to be 8 nmi (15 km; 9.2 mi) wide and usually have a floor of 1,200 ft (370 m) above the ground. It does not include the airspace of a prohibited area. Aerobatic flights are prohibited within federal airways.

=== Victor airways ===
Low altitude airways (below 18,000 feet (5,500 m) MSL) that are based on VOR stations, appear on sectional charts, world aeronautical charts, and en route low altitude charts and are designated with the prefix "V" (pronounced victor, hence, victor airways). Victor airways are usually assigned odd route numbers for north–south routes and even route numbers for east–west routes. Route numbers are listed serially when more than one airway shares the same route segment.

=== Jet routes ===
High altitude airways (from 18,000 feet (5,500 m) MSL to FL450) based on VOR stations are called jet routes; they appear on high altitude charts (that usually do not show topography, as the low altitude charts do) and are prefixed by the letter "J". VOR-based routes are depicted in black on low and high altitude charts produced by the FAA's Aeronautical Navigation Products.

=== RNAV routes ===
With the invention of RNAV routes, airway structure no longer has to be based on ground-based navaids; a new naming convention is used. RNAV routes not based on VOR routes at low altitudes are preceded by the letter "T"; high airway routes are designated with the letter "Q". RNAV routes are depicted in blue on low- and high-altitude charts produced by the FAA's Aeronautical Navigation Products. In addition to the published RNAV routes, if radar monitoring and traffic flow allow, air traffic controllers may approve random RNAV routes for IFR flights.

== Europe ==
Airways are corridors 10 nautical miles (19 km) wide of controlled airspace with a defined lower base, usually FL070–FL100, extending to FL195. They link major airports giving protection to IFR flights during the climb and descent phases and, for non-jet aircraft, often during the cruise phase of flight. Historically, they were laid out between VORs; however, advances in navigational technology mean this is no longer a necessity. Each airway has a designator containing one letter and one to three numbers. All airspace above FL195 is class C controlled airspace, the equivalent to airways being called Upper Air Routes and having designators prefixed with the letter "U". If an upper air route follows the same track as an airway, its designator is the letter "U" prefix and the designator of the underlying airway.

In the UK, airways are all class A below FL195 and, therefore, VFR flights are prohibited.

== Air corridor ==
An air corridor is a designated region of airspace that an aircraft must remain in during its transit through a given region. Air corridors are typically imposed by military or diplomatic requirements. During the Berlin Blockade, for example, pilots flying across Soviet-controlled German airspace were required to maintain very specific positioning within air corridors defined by the commander in charge of the airlift. Subsequent flights, both military and civilian, between West Germany and West Berlin during the Cold War were required to remain within their designated corridor or risk being shot down.

Air corridors should not be confused with airways. Airways are navigational aids that a pilot generally may deviate from when circumstances warrant, while compliance with a designated air corridor is mandatory.
