= Telltale =

Telltale or tell-tale may refer to:

Advisory devices in vehicles:

- Tell-tale (spacecraft), a status indicator in a spacecraft control system
- Tell-tale (sailing), a piece of fabric attached as a guide for adjusting a sail
- Tell-tale (bridges), cords or chains suspended from bridges to warn vehicle drivers of low clearance
- Tell-tale (automotive), a light to signal a problem in a vehicle
- Yaw string, or telltale, a short string to indicate aircraft movement
- A hole in the firebox of a steam engine to warn of corrosion
- A warning device, for the guard, on the end of railway carriage linked to the communication cord to indicate in which carriage the communication cord has been pulled.

Other:

- Telltale (TV series), a 1993 ITV miniseries, starring Bernard Hill and Nigel Harrison
- Tell-Tale (film), a 2009 film based on "The Tell-Tale Heart" by Edgar Allan Poe
- Telltale Games, a video game developer
- Tell-Tale TV, an entertainment news publication
