= Standard rate turn =

Reference for aircraft maneuvering

A standard rate turn in aircraft maneuvering, also known as a rate one turn (ROT), is defined as a turn at 3° per second.

Executing a standard rate turn completes a 360° turn in 2 minutes. This is known as a 2-minute turn, or rate one (180°/min). Fast airplanes, or aircraft on certain precision approaches, use a half-standard-rate ('rate half' in some countries), completing a 360° turn in 4 minutes.

== Usage ==
Image showing the face of a turn coordinator during a standard rate coordinated right turn.

Standardized turn rates are often employed in approaches and holding patterns to provide a reference for controllers and pilots so that each will know what the other is expecting. The pilot banks the airplane such that the turn and slip indicator points to the mark appropriate for that aircraft and then uses a clock to time the turn. The pilot can roll out at any desired direction depending on the length of time in the turn.

During a constant-bank level turn, increasing airspeed decreases the rate of turn, and increases the turn radius. A rate half turn (1.5° per second) is normally used when flying faster than 250 kn. The term rate two turn (6° per second) is used on some low-speed aircraft.

=== Instrumentation ===
Instruments, either the turn and slip indicator or the turn coordinator, have the standard rate or half standard rate turn clearly marked. Slower aircraft are equipped with 2-minute turn indicators while faster aircraft are often equipped with 4-minute turn indicators.

== Formulae ==
=== Angle of bank formula ===
The formula for calculating the angle of bank for a specific true airspeed (TAS) in SI units (or other coherent system) is:

$\phi = \arctan \frac{v_\mathrm{t}^2}{rg}$

where $\phi$ is the angle of bank, $v_\mathrm{t}$ is true airspeed, $r$ is the radius of the turn, and $g$ is the acceleration due to gravity.

For a rate-one turn and velocity in knots (nautical miles per hour, symbol kn), this comes to

$\phi = \arctan \frac{\{v_\mathrm{t}\}_\mathrm{kn}} {364}$.

A convenient approximation for the bank angle in degrees is

$\phi / ^\circ \approx \frac{\{v_\mathrm{t}\}_\mathrm{kn}} {10} + 7$

For aircraft holding purposes, the International Civil Aviation Organization (ICAO) mandates that all turns should be made, "at a bank angle of 25° or at a rate of 3° per second, whichever requires the lesser bank." By the above formula, a rate-one turn at a TAS greater than 180 knots would require a bank angle of more than 25°. Therefore, faster aircraft just use 25° for their turns.

=== Radius of turn formula ===
One might also want to calculate the radius $r$ of a Rate 1, 2 or 3 turn at a specific TAS.

$\{r\}_\mathrm{nmi} = \frac{\{v_\mathrm{t}\}_\mathrm{kn}} {20 \pi \{\omega_\mathrm{turn}\}_{^\circ / \mathrm{s}} }$

Where $\omega_\mathrm{turn}$ is the rate of turn.

If the velocity and the angle of bank is given,

$r\; = \frac{v_\mathrm{t}^2} {g \tan \phi}$

where g is the gravitational acceleration. This is a simplified formula that ignores slip and returns zero for 90° of bank.

In metres (where gravity is approximately 9.81 metres per second per second, and velocity is given in metres per second):

$\{r\}_\mathrm{m} = \frac{\{v_\mathrm{t}\}_\mathrm{\mathrm{m/s}}^2} {9.81 \tan \phi}$

Or in feet (where velocity is given in knots):

$\{r\}_\mathrm{ft} = \frac{\{v_\mathrm{t}\}_\mathrm{kn}^2} {11.294 \tan \phi}$
