= Yaw string =

Device for indicating a slip or skid in an aircraft in flight

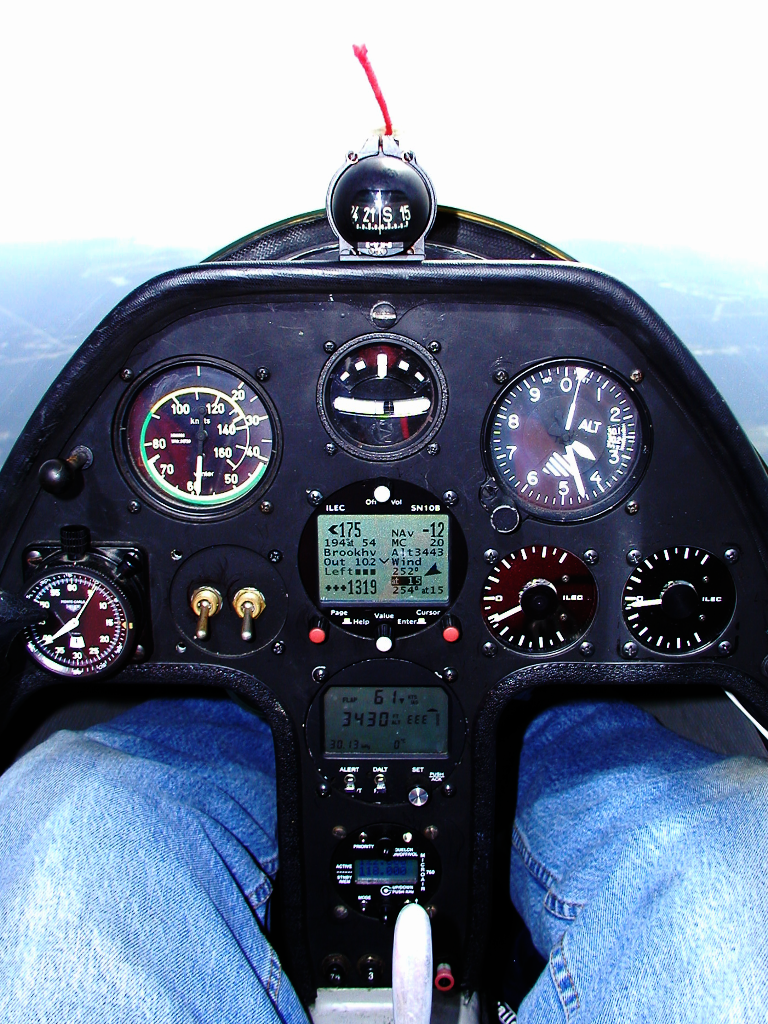
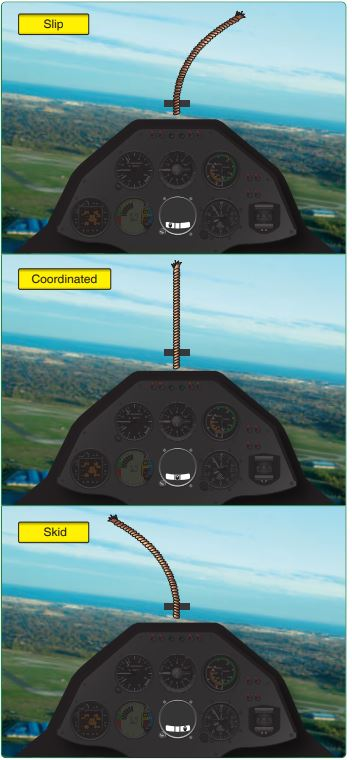
LEFT: A red yarn yaw string on the canopy of a Schempp-Hirth Janus-C glider as seen by the pilot in flight. The yaw string and slip-skid indicator ball show a slight slip with a positive sideslip angle. The pilot should apply right rudder pressure to correct. RIGHT TOP: Left turn slip should be corrected with left rudder pressure. RIGHT BOTTOM: Left turn skid should be corrected with right rudder pressure.

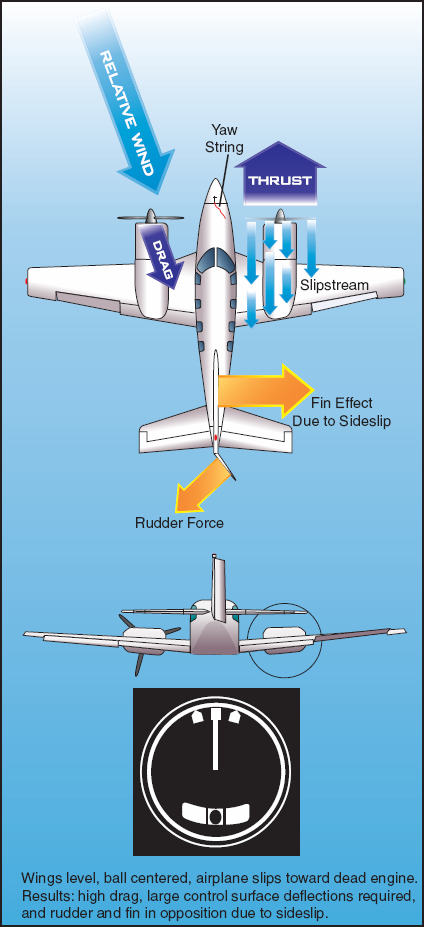
Diagram showing yaw string deflection on a multi-engine airplane flown incorrectly with wings level after an engine failure.

The yaw string, also known as a slip string, is a simple device for indicating a slip or skid in an aircraft in flight. It performs the same function as the slip-skid indicator ball, but is more sensitive, and does not require the pilot to look down at the instrument panel. Technically, it measures sideslip angle, not yaw angle, but this indicates how the aircraft must be yawed to return the sideslip angle to zero.

It is typically constructed from a short piece or tuft of yarn placed in the free air stream where it is visible to the pilot. In closed-cockpit aircraft, it is usually taped to the aircraft canopy. It may also be mounted on the aircraft's nose, either directly on the skin, or elevated on a mast, in which case it may also be fitted with a small paper cone at the trailing end. They are commonly used on gliders, but may also be found on jet aircraft (especially fighters), ultralight aircraft, light-sport aircraft, autogyros, airplanes and helicopters. Its usefulness on airplanes with a tractor configuration (single propeller at the nose) is limited because the propeller creates turbulence and the spiral slipstream displaces the string to one side.

The yaw string is considered a primary flight reference instrument on gliders, which must be flown with near zero sideslip angle to reduce drag as much as possible. It is valued for its high sensitivity, and the fact that it is presented in a head-up display. Even the most sophisticated modern racing sailplanes are fitted with yaw strings by their pilots, who reference them constantly throughout the flight.

== History ==
The yaw string dates from the earliest days of aviation, and actually was the first flight instrument. The Wright Brothers used a yaw string on their 1902 glider tied on their front mounted elevator. Wilbur Wright is credited with its invention, having applied it concurrently with the movable rudder invented by his brother Orville in October 1902, although others may have used it before. Glenn Curtiss also used it on his early airplanes.

== Operation ==
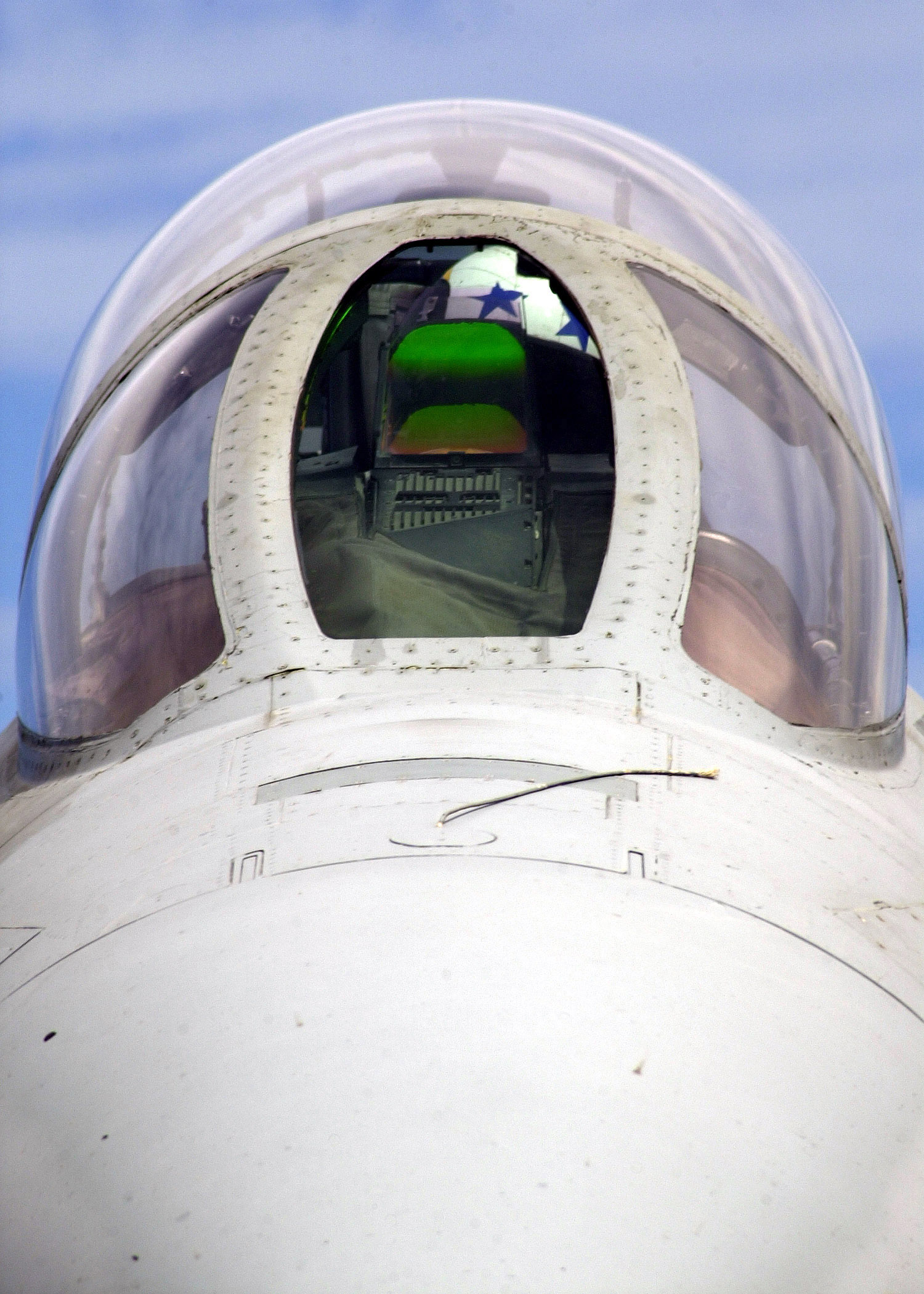
Yaw string used in front of the cockpit of an F-14D Tomcat

In flight, pilots are instructed to step on the head of the yaw string; the head is the front of the string, where the string is attached to the aircraft. If the head of the yaw string is to the right of the yaw string tail, then the pilot should apply right rudder pressure. If the head of the yaw string is to the left of the yaw string tail, then the pilot should apply left rudder pressure. Or pilots may be instructed to view the attached point of the yaw string as an arrowhead pointing to the rudder pedal needing application of pressure. According to Helmut Reichmann, "...rudder against the string and/or aileron toward the string."

In a spin the yaw string always points in the direction of spin. Inclinometers do not work in spins because they follow the local centrifugal direction. In a spin, only turn needles and yaw strings are reliable. Turn coordinators work if erect but not when inverted.

== Use on powered aircraft ==
Yaw strings are also fitted to the Lockheed U-2 high-altitude surveillance aircraft and variants of the Grumman F-14 Tomcat. A flat spin, caused by excessive sideslip even in level flight, happens much more easily at high altitudes. Some light twin-engine airplane pilots place yaw strings on their aircraft to help maintain control in the event of an engine failure, because the slip-skid indicator ball is not accurate in this case. In a multiengine airplane with an inoperative engine, the centered ball is no longer the indicator of zero sideslip due to asymmetrical thrust. The yaw string is the only flight instrument that will directly tell the pilot the flight conditions for zero sideslip.

Yaw strings are also used on some (especially smaller) helicopters.

== Side string ==
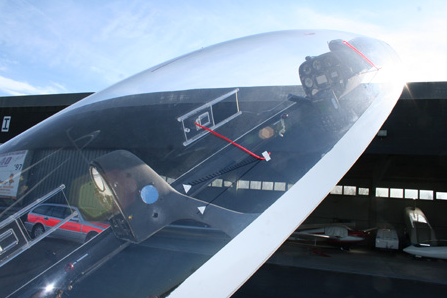
Side string

A variation of the yaw string is the side string, used in gliders for a determination of the angle of attack. In this way the speed for best glide angle, the best thermalling speed and the stall speed can be observed independently of other parameters like air speed, aircraft weight, acceleration due to turning, stick movements, and gusts.

Investigations of the side string and on its use in glider flight were performed by the Akaflieg Köln.

== See also ==
- Glider (sailplane)
- Gliding
- Sideslip angle
- Slip (aerodynamic)
- Tuft
- Tell-tale (sailing)
- Critical engine
