= Tuft (aeronautics) =

Device to reveal air flow

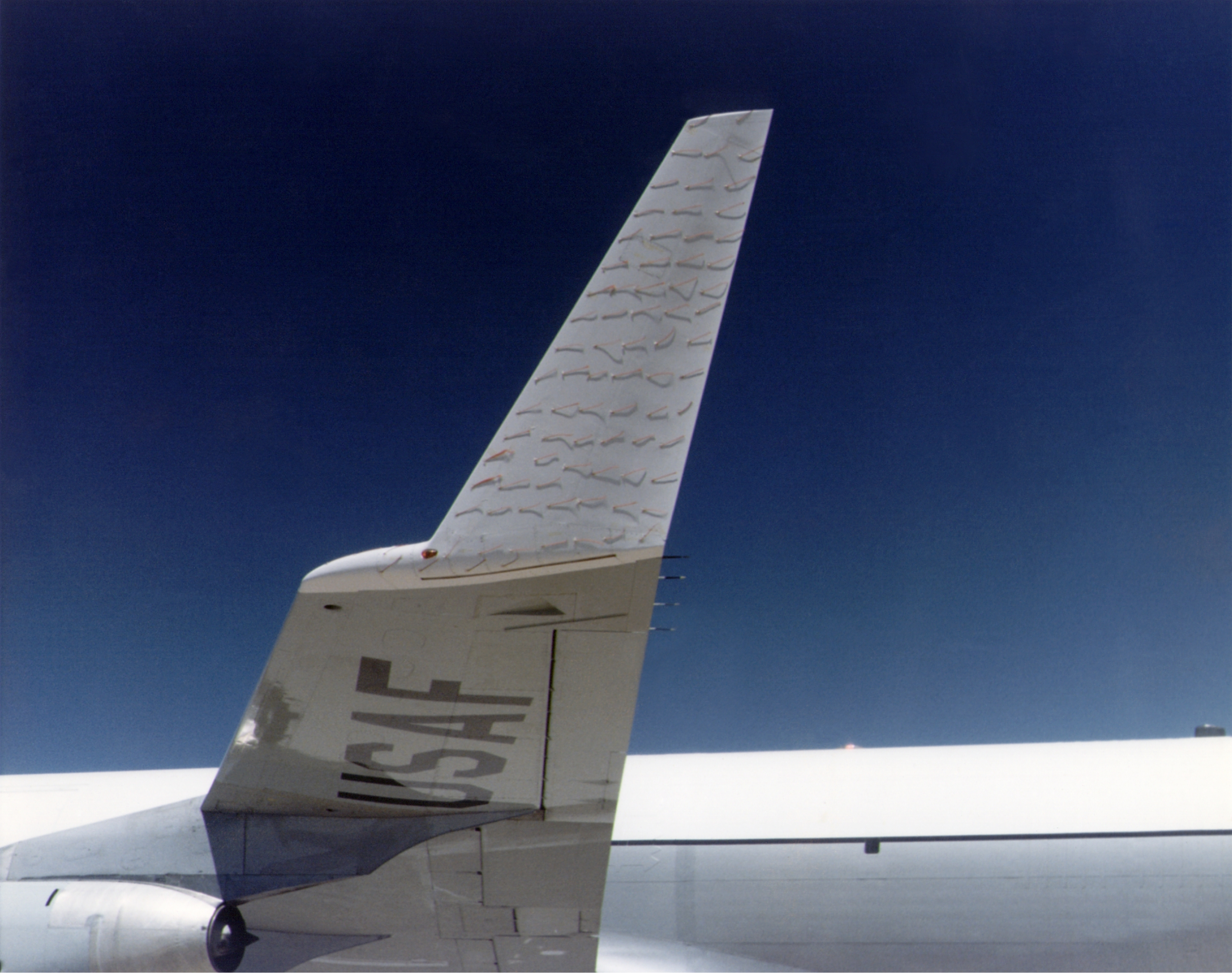
A winglet on a KC-135 Stratotanker with attached tufts showing airflow during NASA tests in 1979–80.

In aeronautics, tufts are pieces of yarn or string, typically around 15 cm (6 in) long, attached to an aircraft surface in a grid pattern and imaged during flight. Their motion can be observed and recorded to locate air flow features such as boundary layer separation and reattachment. Tufting is, therefore, a technique for flow visualization. They are used during flight testing to study air flow direction, strength, and boundary layer properties.

The world's largest bed of tufts (18.6 m by 18.6 m, 61 feet by 61 feet) was created at NASA Ames Research Center to study air flow fields involving a helicopter's rotor disk.

== See also ==
- Yaw string
