= Tell-tale (spacecraft) =

In space systems a tell-tale is a single-bit status indicator that is included in telemetry or is used within the spacecraft's on-board software to signal conditions that must be tracked or acted upon, especially when the status changes. A tell-tale may continually change as the status it is tracking changes, or, it may change once upon change of status and then remain at that value until deliberately cleared. The latter type of tell-tale is known as a "sticky-bit" because its value "sticks", that is, remains constant, once it has been set.

The Phoenix spacecraft contains another type of tell-tale, developed by the University of Aarhus in Denmark, as part of its Meteorological Station. It is a small tube that is deflected by the martian wind, similar to a sailing tell-tale. The science payload's stereo camera recorded images of its motion to be used to determine wind direction and speed.
