= Coordinated flight =

Flight of an aircraft without sideslip

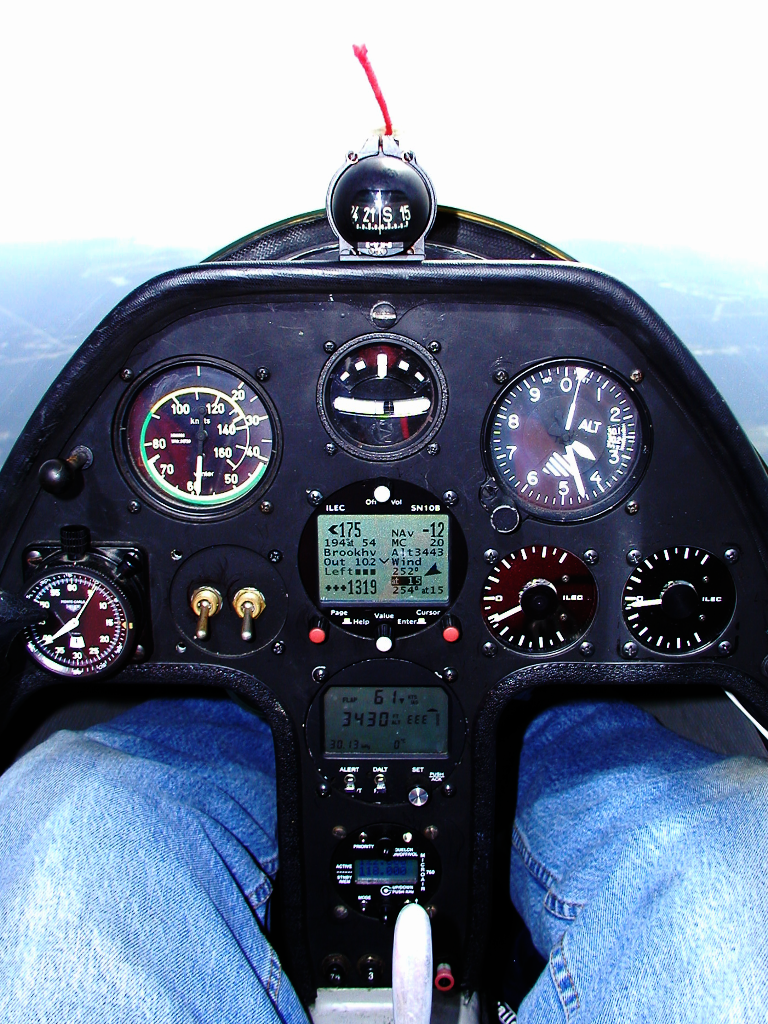
Pilot's view of a Schempp-Hirth Janus-C glider. The yaw string (red wool) on the canopy and the turn and bank indicator (top center of the instrument panel) both show the glider is not in coordinated flight. The glider is slipping slightly nose-left. Coordinated flight can be restored by the pilot applying pressure to the right rudder pedal.

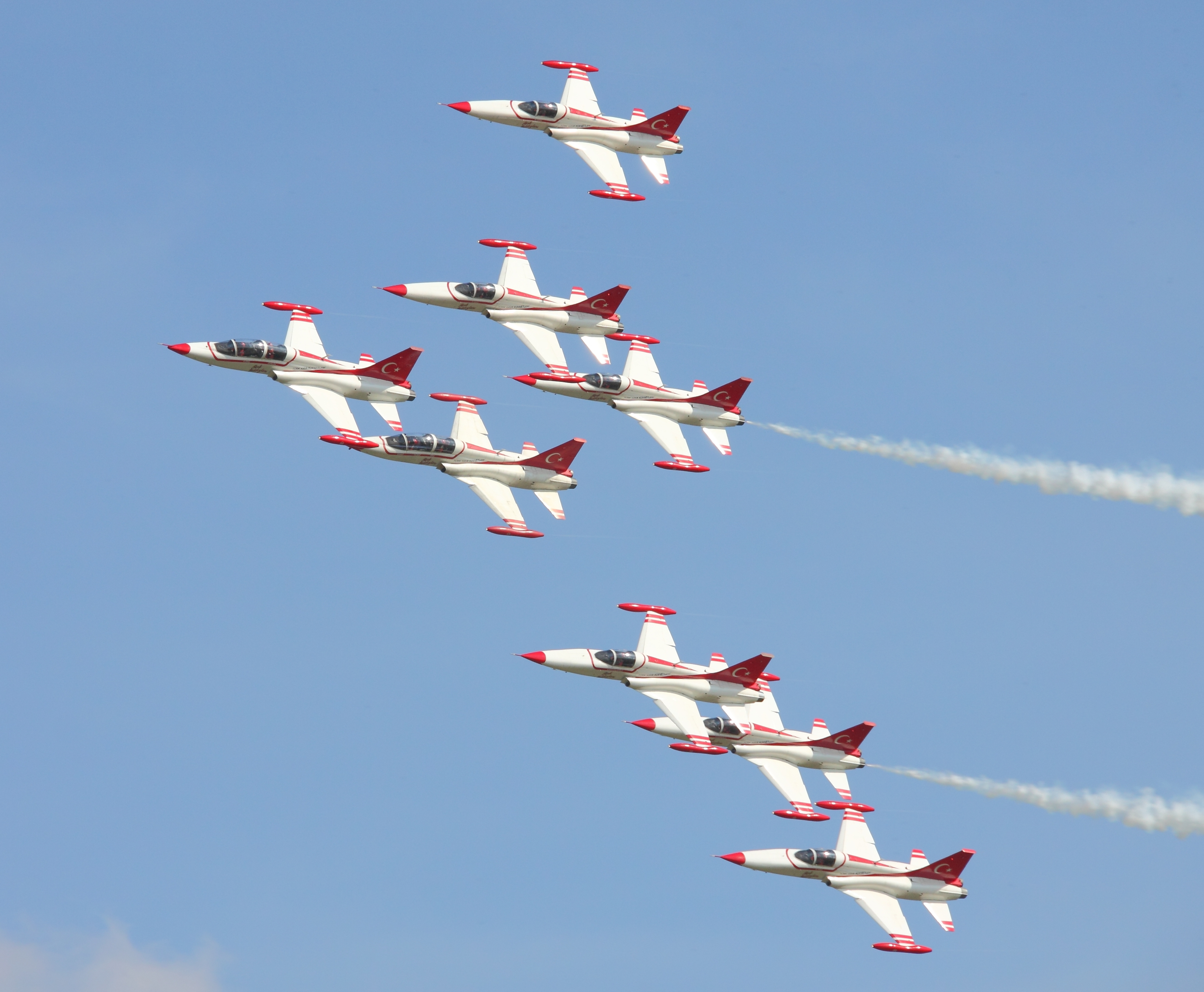
The Türk Yıldızları performing a coordinated turn. In team aerobatics the notion is especially important, as sideslip may likely result in an in-flight collision.

In aviation, coordinated flight of an aircraft is flight without sideslip.

When an aircraft is flying with zero sideslip a turn and bank indicator installed on the aircraft's instrument panel usually shows the ball in the center of the spirit level. The occupants perceive no lateral acceleration of the aircraft and their weight to be acting straight downward into their seats.

Particular care to maintain coordinated flight is required by the pilot when entering and leaving turns.

== Advantages ==
Coordinated flight is usually preferred over uncoordinated flight for the following reasons:

- it is more comfortable for the occupants
- it minimises the drag force on the aircraft
- it causes fuel to be drawn equally from tanks in both wings
- it minimises the risk of entering a spin

== Instrumentation ==
Airplanes and helicopters are usually equipped with a turn and bank indicator to provide their pilots with a continuous display of the lateral balance of their aircraft so the pilots can ensure coordinated flight.

Glider pilots attach a piece of coloured string to the outside of the canopy to sense the sideslip angle and assist in maintaining coordinated flight.

== Axes of rotation ==
An airplane has three axes of rotation:

1. Pitch – in which the nose of the airplane moves up or down. This is typically controlled by the elevator at the rear of the airplane.
2. Yaw – in which the nose of the airplane moves left or right. This is typically controlled by the rudder at the rear of the airplane.
3. Roll (bank) – in which one wing of the airplane moves up and the other moves down. This is typically controlled by ailerons on the wings of the airplane.

Coordinated flight requires the pilot to use pitch, roll and yaw control simultaneously. See also flight dynamics.

== Coordinating the turn ==
If the pilot were to use only the rudder to initiate a turn in the air, the airplane would tend to "skid" to the outside of the turn.

If the pilot were to use only the ailerons to initiate a turn in the air, the airplane would tend to "slip" toward the lower wing.

If the pilot were to fail to use the elevator to increase the angle of attack throughout the turn, the airplane would also tend to "slip" toward the lower wing.

However, if the pilot makes appropriate use of the rudder, ailerons and elevator to enter and leave the turn such that sideslip and lateral acceleration are zero the airplane will be in coordinated flight.

== See also ==
- Adverse yaw
