= Liquid capacitive inclinometer =

Liquid capacitive inclinometers are inclinometers (or clinometers) whose sensing elements are made with a liquid-filled differential capacitor; they sense the local direction of acceleration due to gravity (or movement). A capacitive inclinometer has a disc-like cavity that is partly filled with a dielectric liquid. One of the sides of the cavity has an etched conductor plate that is used to form one of the conductors of a variable parallel plate capacitor. The liquid along with the other side of the cavity forms the other plate of the capacitor. In operation, the sensor is mounted so that the disc is in a vertical plane with its axis horizontal. Gravity then acts on the liquid pulling it down in the cavity forming a semicircle. As the sensor is rotated the liquid remains in this semicircular pattern covering a different area of the etched plate. This change in area results in a change in the capacitance. The change in capacitance is then electronically converted into an output signal that is linear with respect to the input angle.
