= Tilt detector =

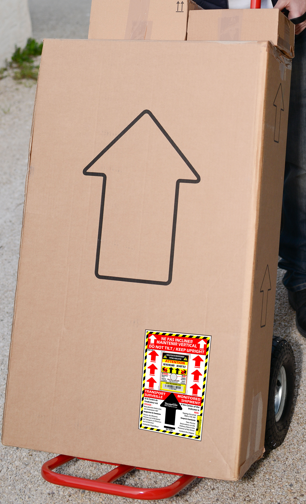
Package with one tilt indicator

A tilt detector or tilt indicator is a device which indicates whether a tilt has occurred. Tilt detectors can be used on shipments of tilt sensible items to indicate whether a potentially damaging tilt have occurred. They are also used in the field of electronics or automotive on some models to detect if a change in vehicle inclination has occurred.

== Overview ==
Tilts are often specified by the angle formed by the object considered with a horizontal plane. This is usually expressed in degrees (or radian). Depending on the application, the accuracy of the tilt sensor must be adapted to the sensitivity of the object it is intended to monitor.

Indeed, they can indicate precisely the level of inclination with a digital dial ( as for the inclination sensors on some vehicles) or simply have an indicator that changes color when an inclination beyond the reference threshold has been exceeded.

== Technologies ==
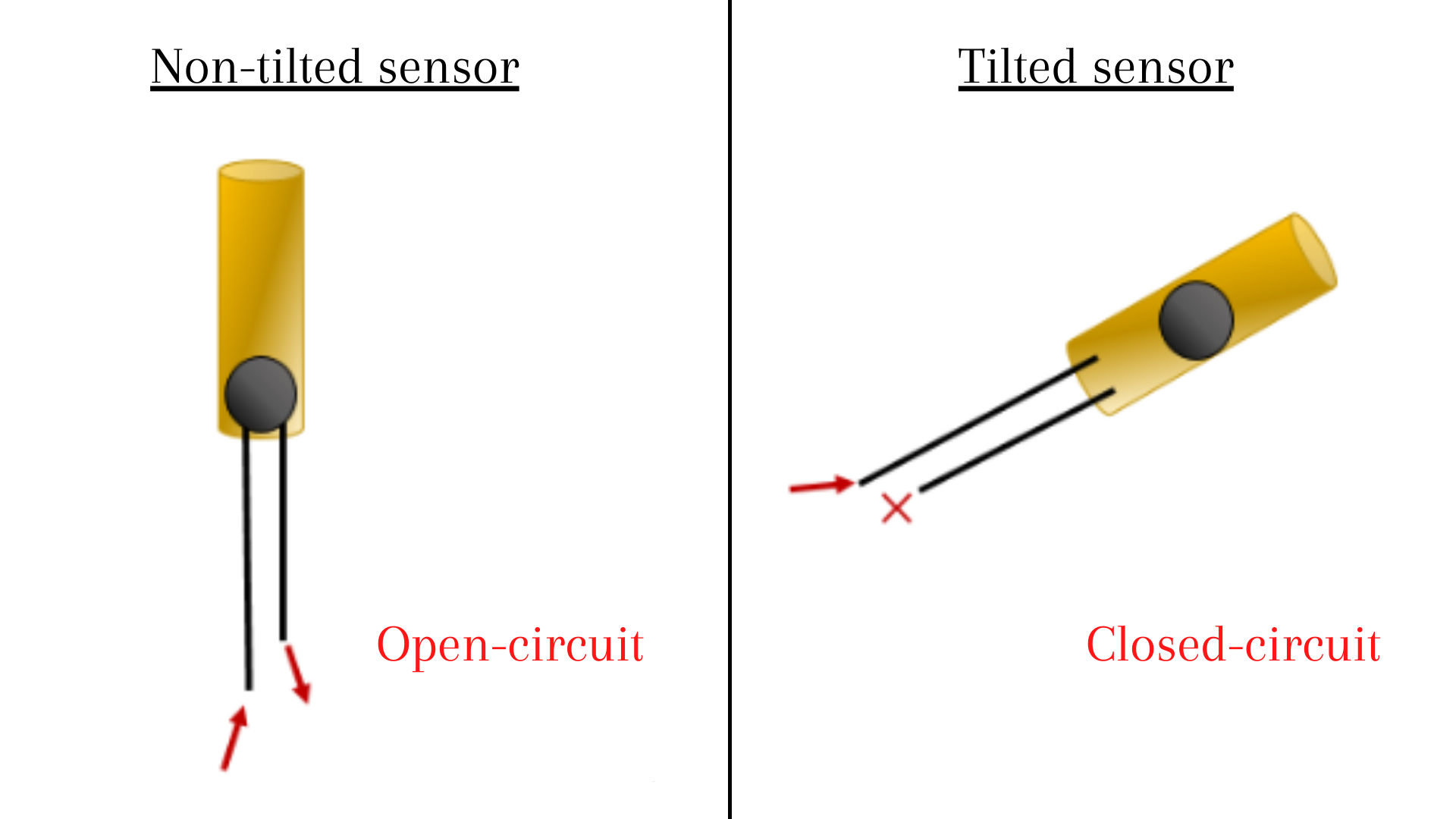
Circuit diagram of a tilt sensor in the case of electronic components

There is a wide variety of technologies of this type of device. Here is a list of the main technologies :

- When the sensor is powered, a rolling ball drops to the bottom of the sensor to make an electrical connection with a conductive plate underneath. When the sensor is titled, the ball does not fall to the bottom so that current cannot flow through the two end terminals of the sensor.
- When the indicator suffers a reversal beyond its reference threshold, a metal pellet, initially blocked in a cockpit, dislodges and leaves a red background irreversibly.
- It can be the same principle as the point above but with powder.
- When the electrolytic sensor tilts, the fluid surface remains level due to gravity. The fluid is electrically conductive, and the conductivity between the two electrodes is proportional to the length of electrode immersed in the fluid.

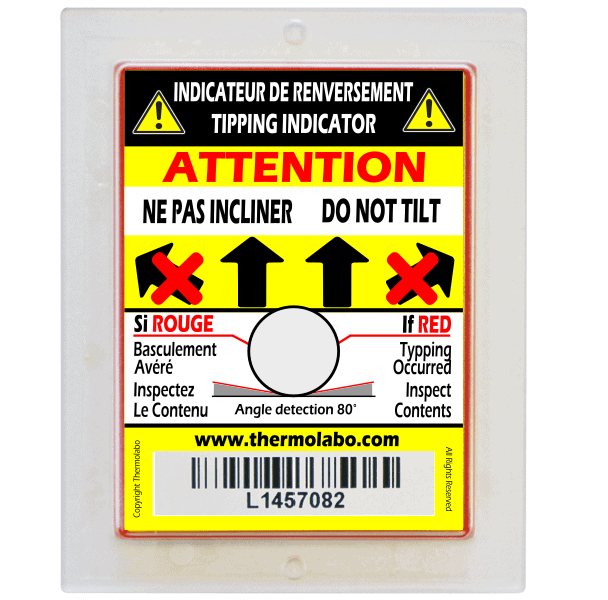
Tilt indicator

== Transport and logistics ==
In general, it is a single-use device that allows supply chain operators to check if the package has been tilted, which could lead to its deterioration. It is positioned thanks to an adhesive backing from the device.

Its appearance deliberately attracts the attention of the links in the supply chain in order to encourage them to take particular care during handling.

The recipient can express reservations to protect its interests or even reject the shipment when the indicator is triggered. The cost of an indicator is usually modest. The most common indicators in the market are 45° and 80°. Another tilt indicator detects starting from 30 degrees, and every 10 degrees is detected up to 80 degrees, and also 180 degree detection.

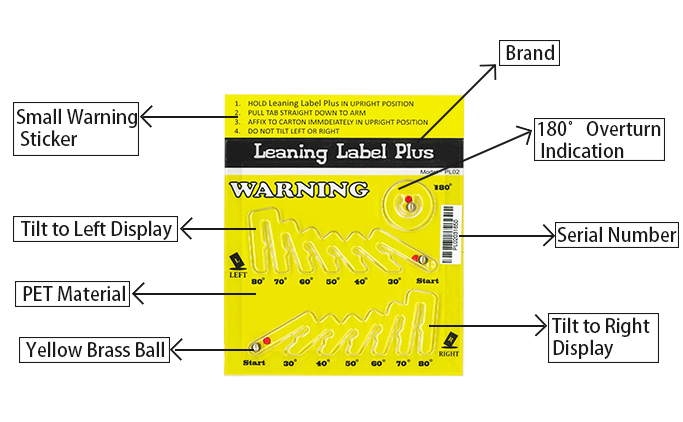
Leaning Label Plus detects tilt direction, set degree and overturn.

When in use, since only one-axis detection is possible, place 2 PCS on each adjacent side because it detect left and right/ front and back.

== Heavy plant machinery and automobile ==
Tilts sensors play an important role in preventing rollovers in the construction industry. For example, measuring the chassis angle ensures that the base of the MEWP is within a safe angle for vehicle operation. This sensor can also indicate that the vehicle is in a dangerous position.

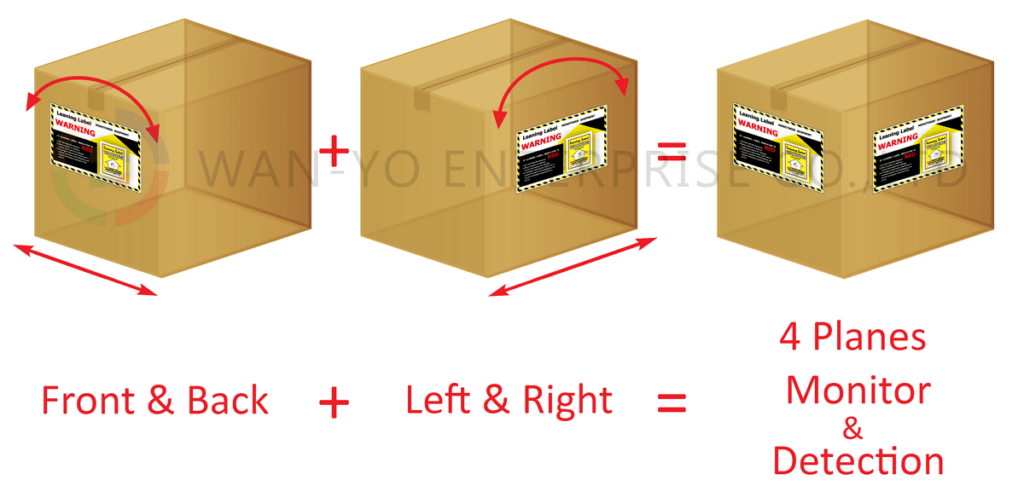
Place 2 PCS on each adjacent side because it detect left and right/ front and back.

A tilt sensor on a vehicle determines the orientation of the vehicle when it makes a tight turn or is in danger of tipping over.

== Electronics ==
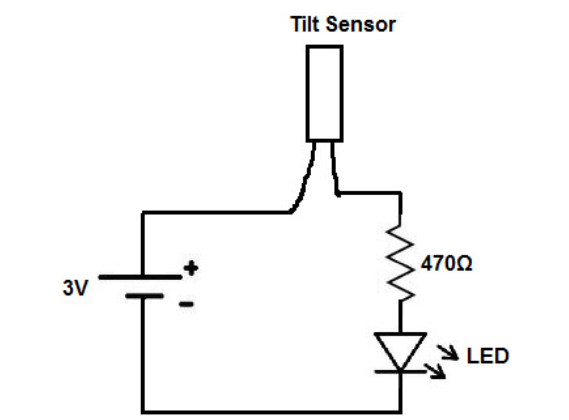
Basic circuit using a tilt sensor

Tilt or rollover sensors are devices that produce an electrical signal that varies with angular motion. These sensors are used to measure slope and tilt within a limited range of motion.<

Sometimes tilt sensors are incorrectly called inclinometers because the sensors simply generate a signal (as opposed to inclinometers that generate a reading and a signal).

A basic circuit using a tilt sensor is shown here. For this assembly, the components used are: a tilt sensor, a 470 Ohms resistor, a LED and a 3V power supply.
