= Inclinometer =

Instrument used to measure the inclination of a surface relative to local gravity

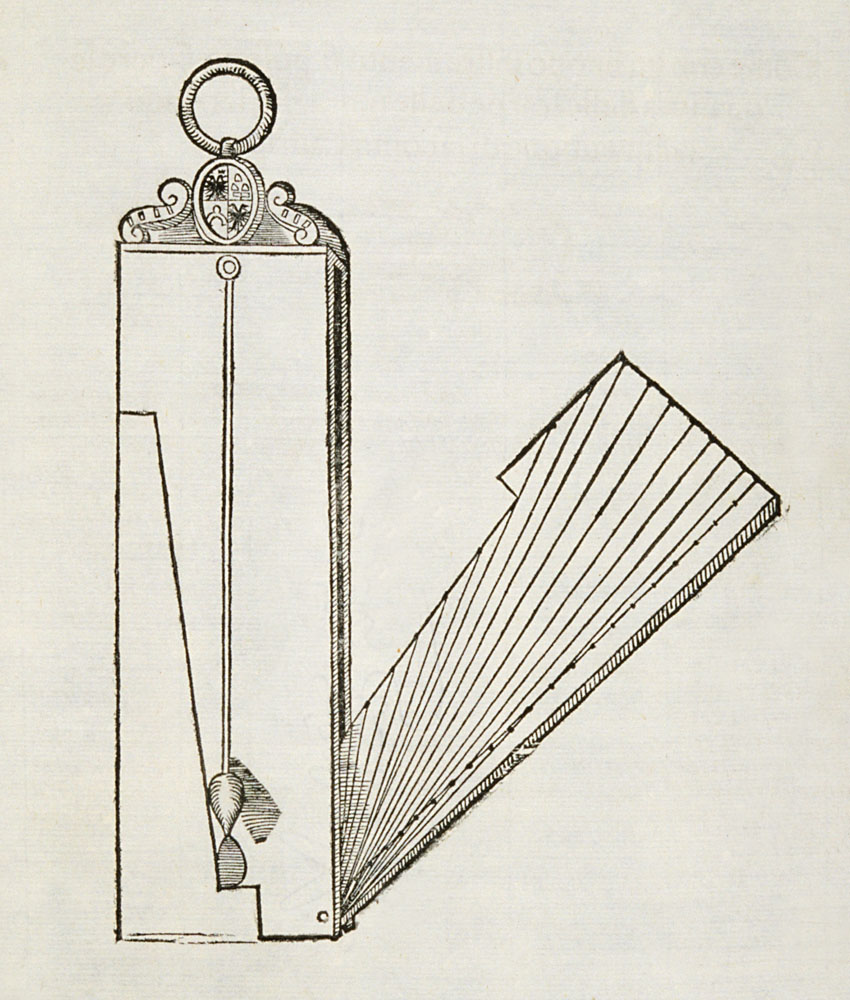
Drawing of an inclinometer, Museo Galileo, Florence

Measuring slope with a clinometer

An inclinometer or clinometer is an instrument used for measuring angles of slope, elevation, or depression of an object with respect to gravity's direction. It is also known as a tilt indicator, tilt sensor, tilt meter, slope alert, slope gauge, gradient meter, gradiometer, level gauge, level meter, declinometer, and pitch & roll indicator. Clinometers measure both inclines and declines using three different units of measure: degrees, percentage points, and topos. The astrolabe is an example of an inclinometer that was used for celestial navigation and location of astronomical objects from ancient times to the Renaissance.

A tilt sensor can measure the tilting in often two axes of a reference plane in two axes. In contrast, a full motion would use at least three axes and often additional sensors. One way to measure tilt angle with reference to the earth's ground plane, is to use an accelerometer. Typical applications can be found in the industry and in game controllers. In aircraft, the "ball" in turn coordinators or turn and bank indicators is sometimes referred to as an inclinometer.

== History ==
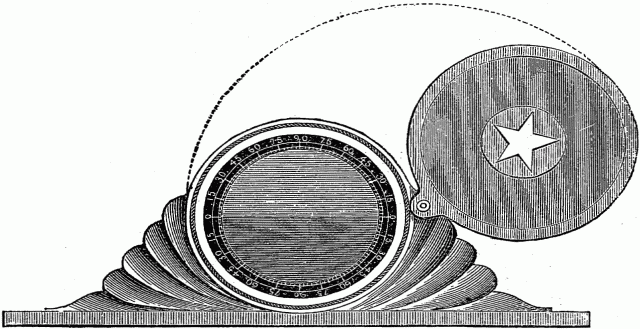
The Well's clinometer

Inclinometers include examples such as Well's in-clinometer, the essential parts of which are a flat side, or base, on which it stands, and a hollow disc just half filled with some heavy liquid. The glass face of the disc is surrounded by a graduated scale that marks the angle at which the surface of the liquid stands, with reference to the flat base. The zero line is parallel to the base, and when the liquid stands on that line, the flat side is horizontal; the 90 degree is perpendicular to the base, and when the liquid stands on that line, the flat side is perpendicular or plumb. Intervening angles are marked, and, with the aid of simple conversion tables, the instrument indicates the rate of fall per set distance of horizontal measurement, and set distance of the sloping line.

Al-Biruni, a Persian polymath, once wanted to measure the height of the sun. He lacked the necessary equipment to measure this height. He was forced to create a calibrated arc on the back of a counting board, which he then used as a makeshift quadrant with the help of a plumb line. He determined the location's latitude using the measurements taken with this rudimentary tool. This quadrant was most likely an inclinometer based on the quarter-circle panel.

The Abney level is a handheld surveying instrument developed in the 1870s that includes a sighting tube and inclinometer, arranged so that the surveyor may align the sighting tube (and its crosshair) with the reflection of the bubble in the spirit level of the inclinometer when the line of sight is at the angle set on the inclinometer.

One of the more famous inclinometer installations was on the panel of the Ryan NYP "The Spirit of St. Louis" aircraft built for the first nonstop transatlantic flight—in 1927 Charles Lindbergh chose the lightweight Rieker Inc P-1057 Degree Inclinometer to give him climb and descent angle information.

== Uses ==
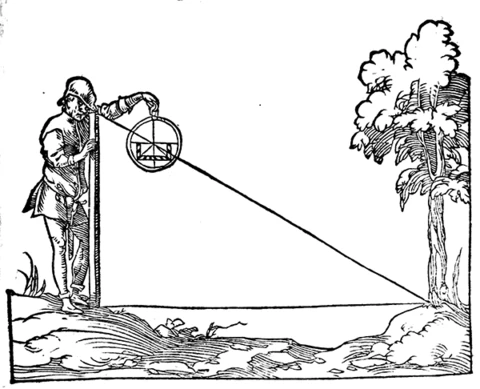
Measuring the distance across a stream

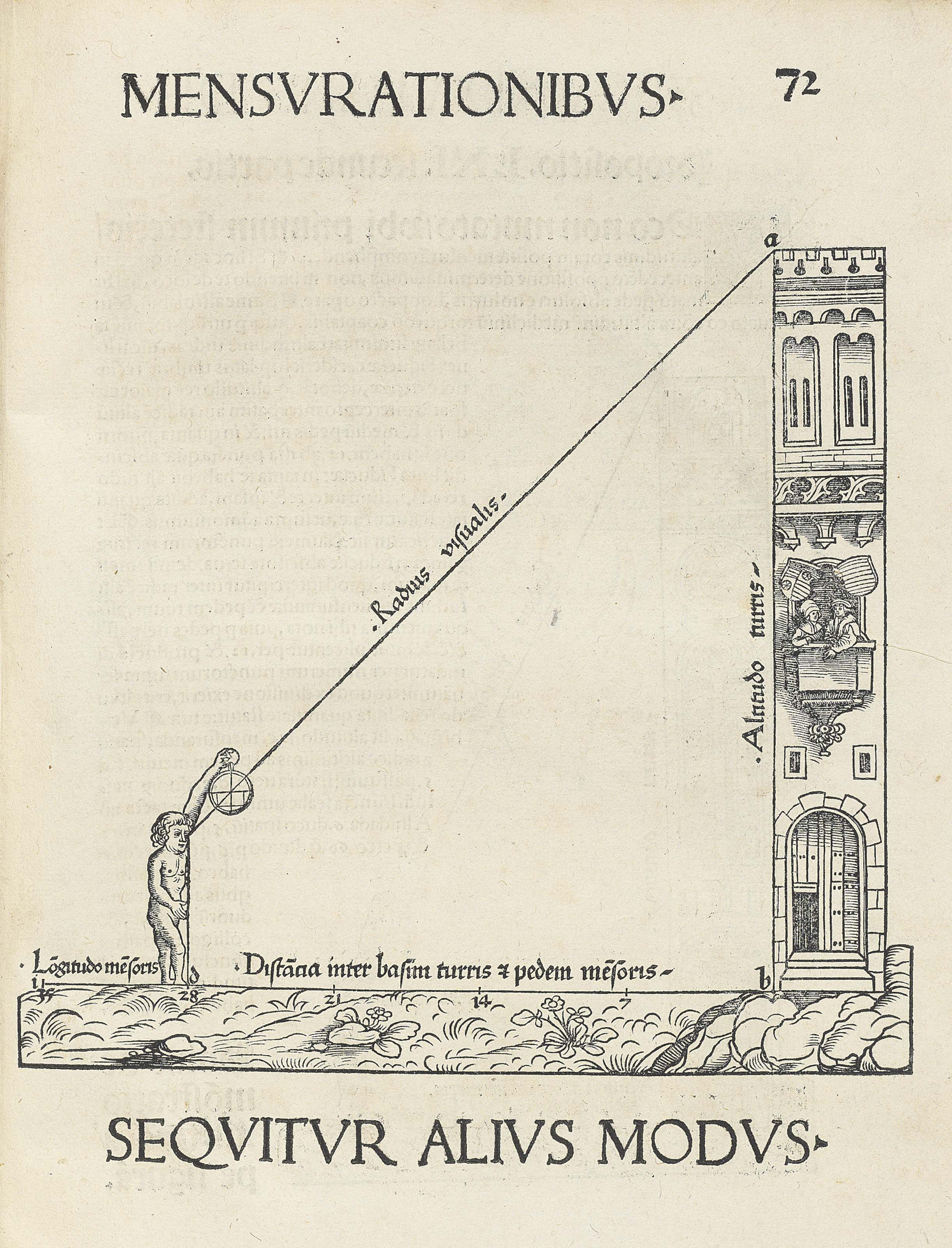
Measuring a building's height

Hand-held clinometers are used for a variety of surveying and measurement tasks. In land surveying and mapping, a clinometer can provide a rapid measurement of the slope of a geographic feature, or used for cave survey. In prospecting for minerals, clinometers are used to measure the strike and dip of geologic formations. In forestry, tree height measurement can be done with a clinometer using standardized methods including triangulation. Major artillery guns may have an associated clinometer used to facilitate aiming of shells over long distances.

Permanently-installed tiltmeters are emplaced at major earthworks such as dams to monitor the long-term stability of the structure.

== Accuracy ==
Certain highly sensitive electronic inclinometer sensors can achieve an output resolution to 0.0001°; depending on the technology and angle range, it may be limited to 0.001°. An inclinometer sensor's true or absolute accuracy (which is the combined total error), however, is a combination of initial sets of sensor zero offset and sensitivity, sensor linearity, hysteresis, repeatability, and the temperature drifts of zero and sensitivity—electronic inclinometers accuracy can typically range from ±0.01–2° depending on the sensor and situation. Typically in room ambient conditions the accuracy is limited to the sensor linearity specification.

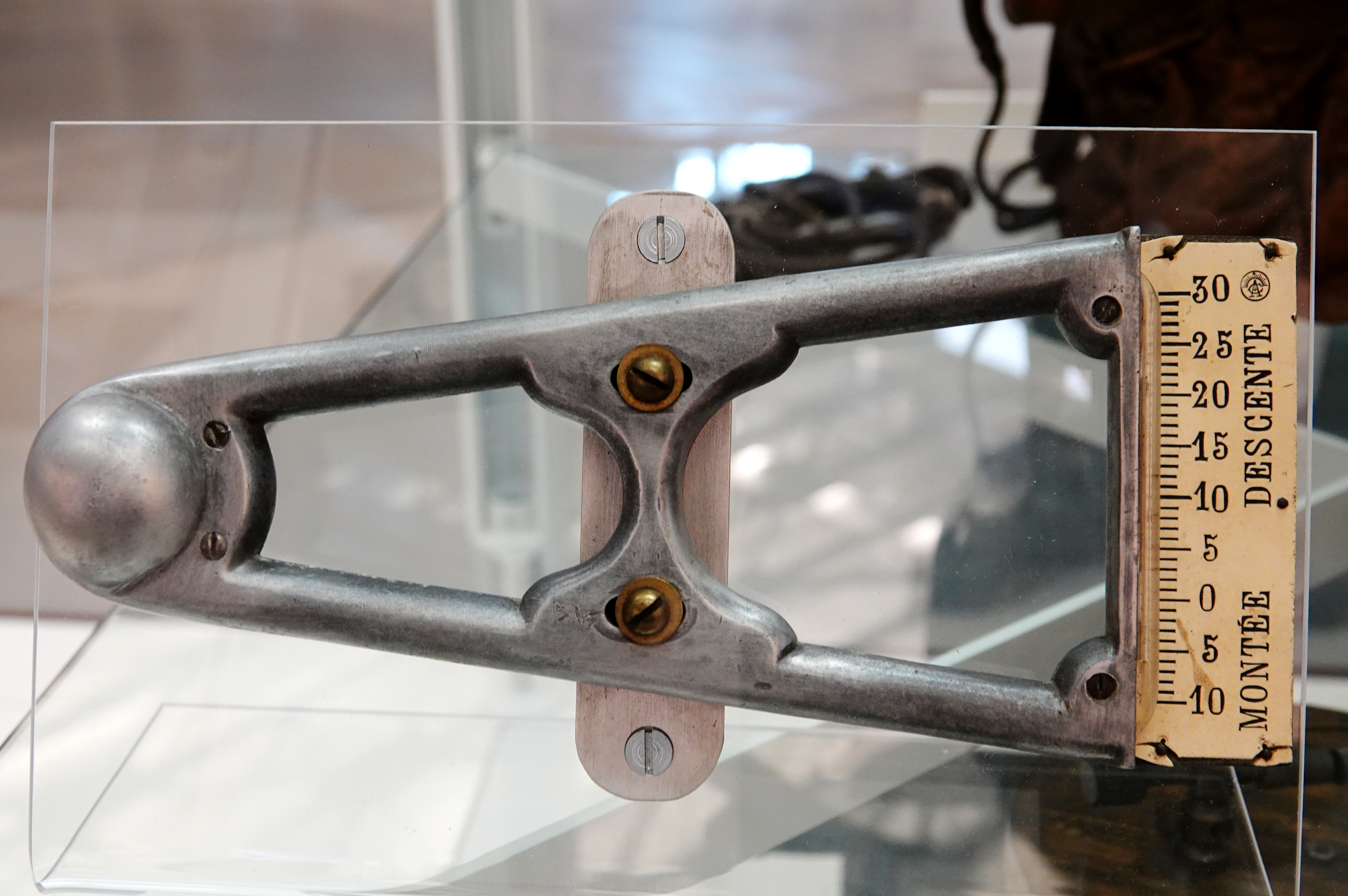
Blériot Monoplane Inclinometer

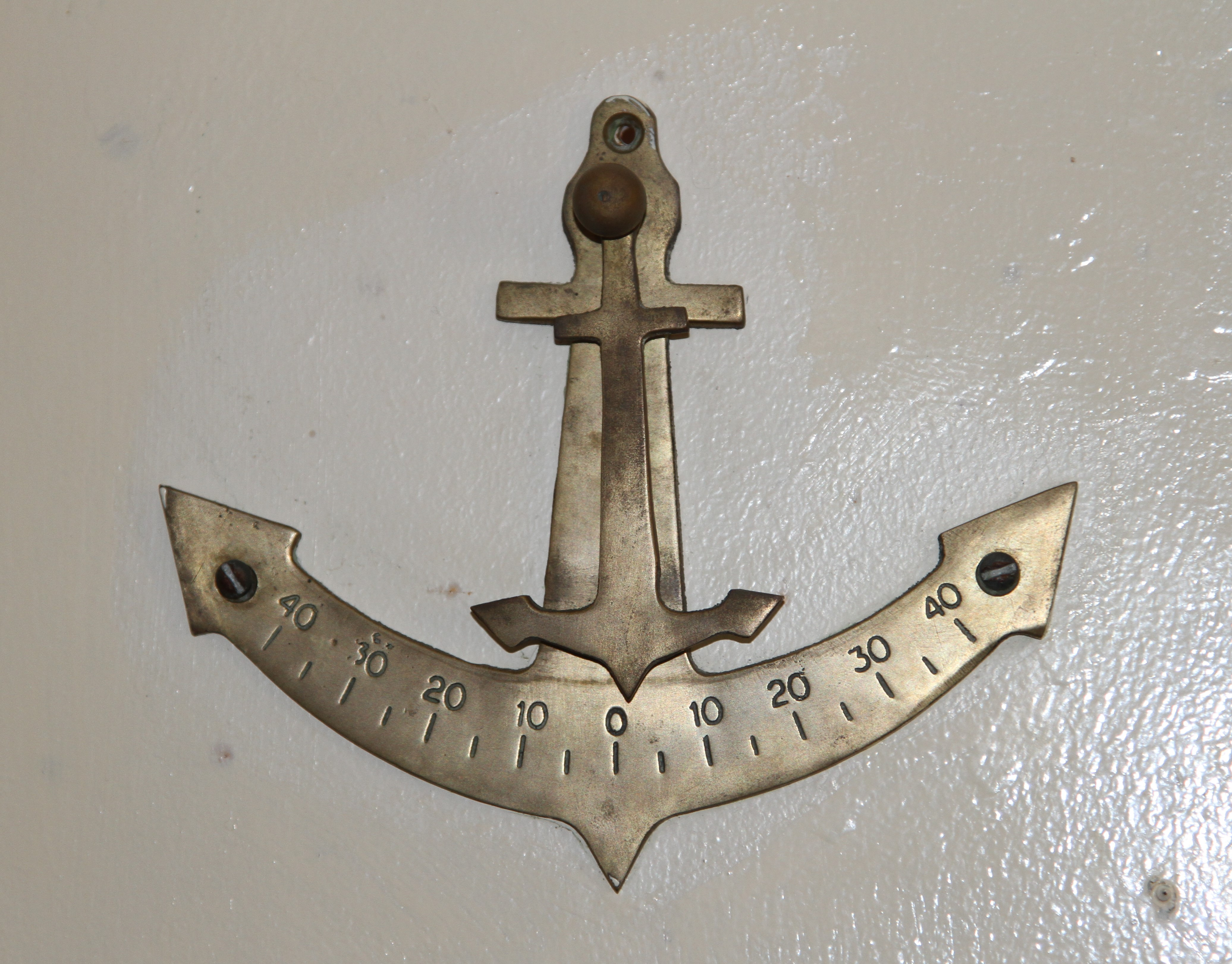
Nautical wall inclinometer

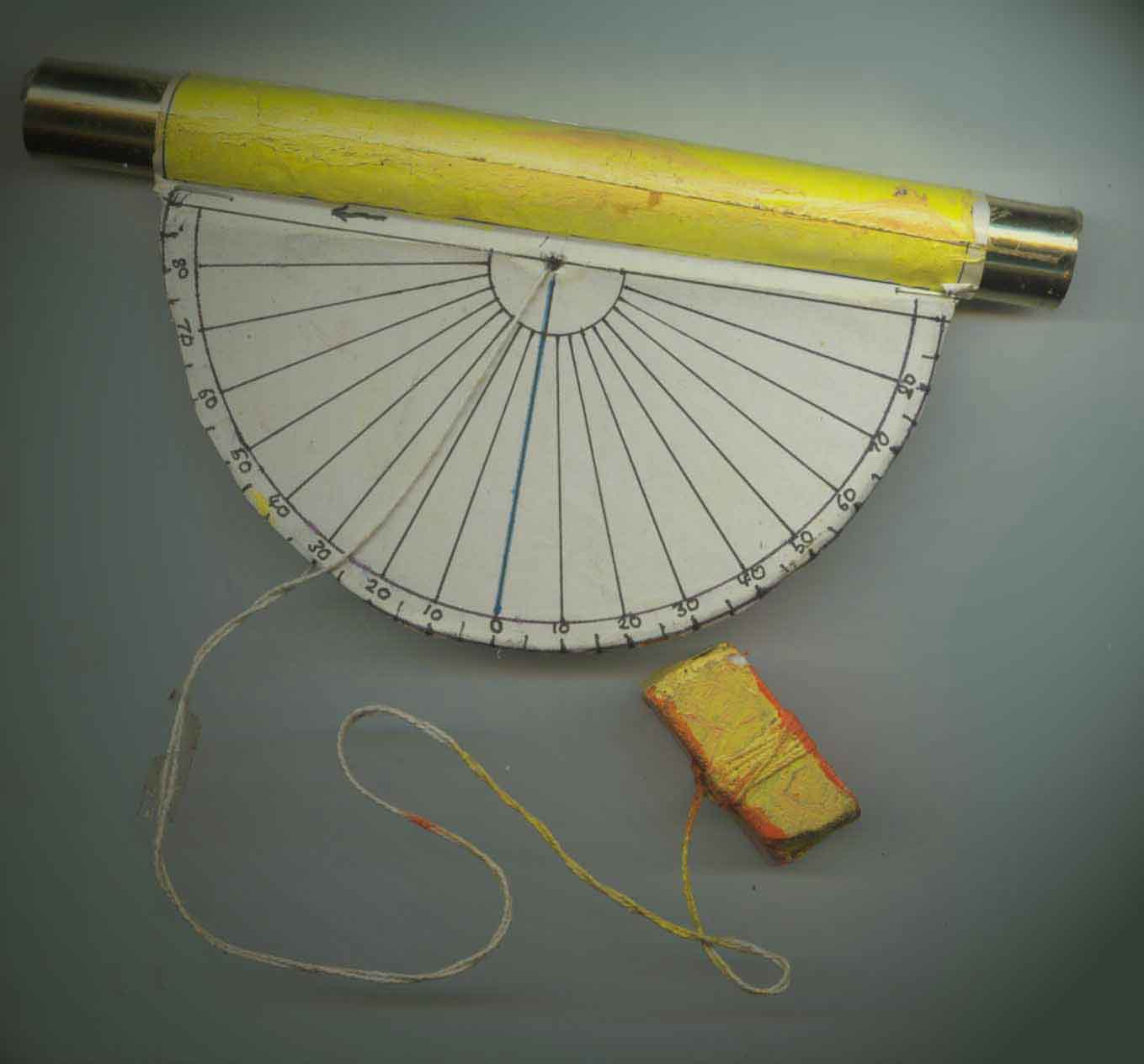
Simple clinometer

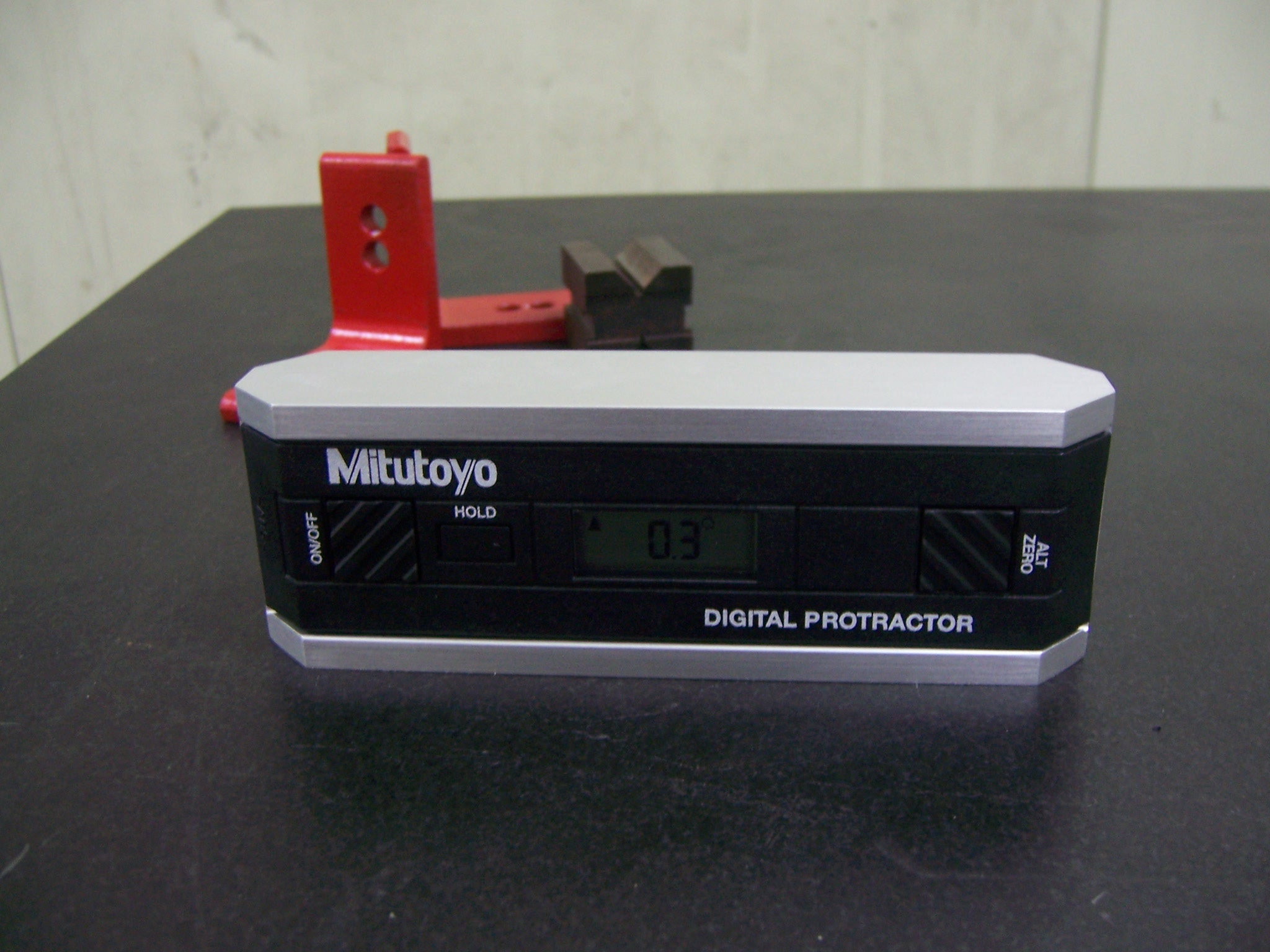
Digital protractor

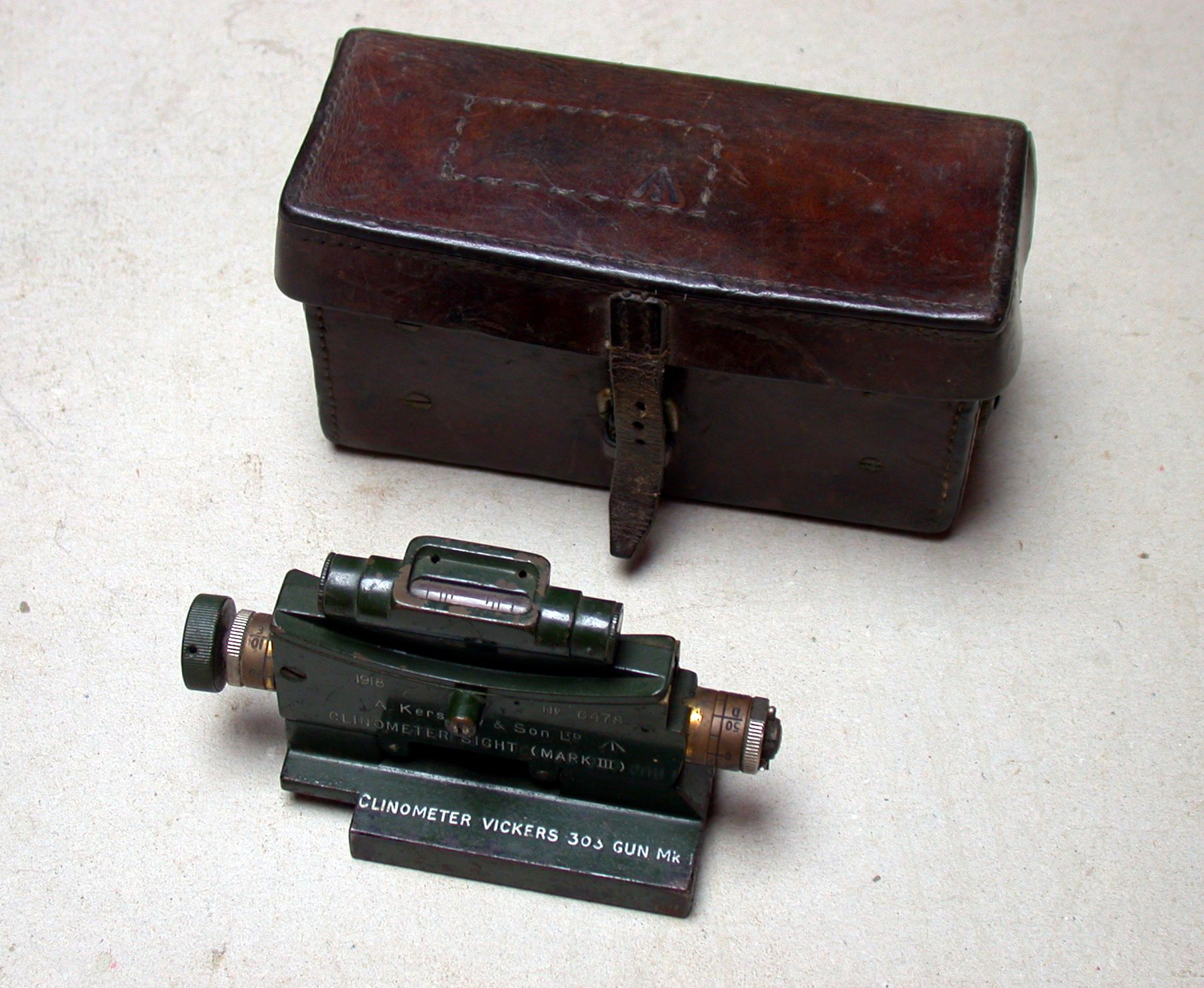
Clinometer designed to enable indirect fire capability with a Vickers machine gun circa 1918

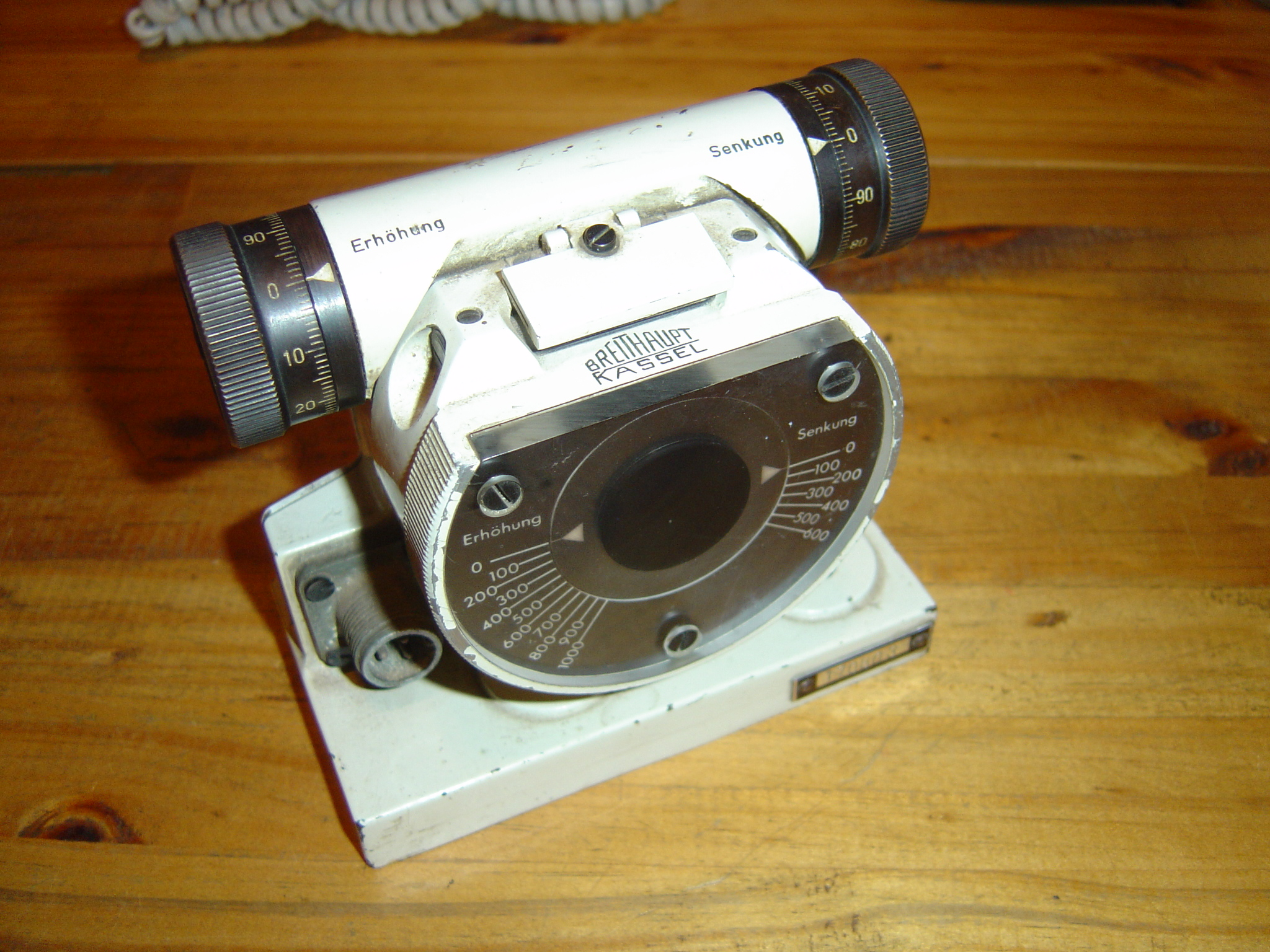
Mechanical spirit level clinometer with micrometer adjustment

== Sensor technology ==
Tilt sensors and inclinometers generate an artificial horizon and measure angular tilt with respect to this horizon. They are used in cameras, aircraft flight controls, automobile security systems, and speciality switches and are also used for platform leveling, boom angle indication, and in other applications requiring measurement of tilt.

Important specifications to consider for tilt sensors and inclinometers are the tilt angle range and the number of axes. The axes are usually, but not always, orthogonal. The tilt angle range is the range of desired linear output.

Common implementations of tilt sensors and inclinometers are accelerometer, liquid capacitive, electrolytic, gas bubble in liquid, and pendulum.

Tilt sensor technology has also been implemented in video games. Yoshi's Universal Gravitation and Kirby Tilt 'n' Tumble are both built around a tilt sensor mechanism, which is built into the cartridge. The PlayStation 3 and Wii game controllers also use tilt as a means to play video games.

Inclinometers are also used in civil engineering, for example, to measure the inclination of land to be built upon.

Some inclinometers provide an electronic interface based on CAN (Controller Area Network). In addition, those inclinometers may support the standardized CANopen profile (CiA 410). In this case, these inclinometers are compatible and partly interchangeable.

== Two-axis digital inclinometer ==
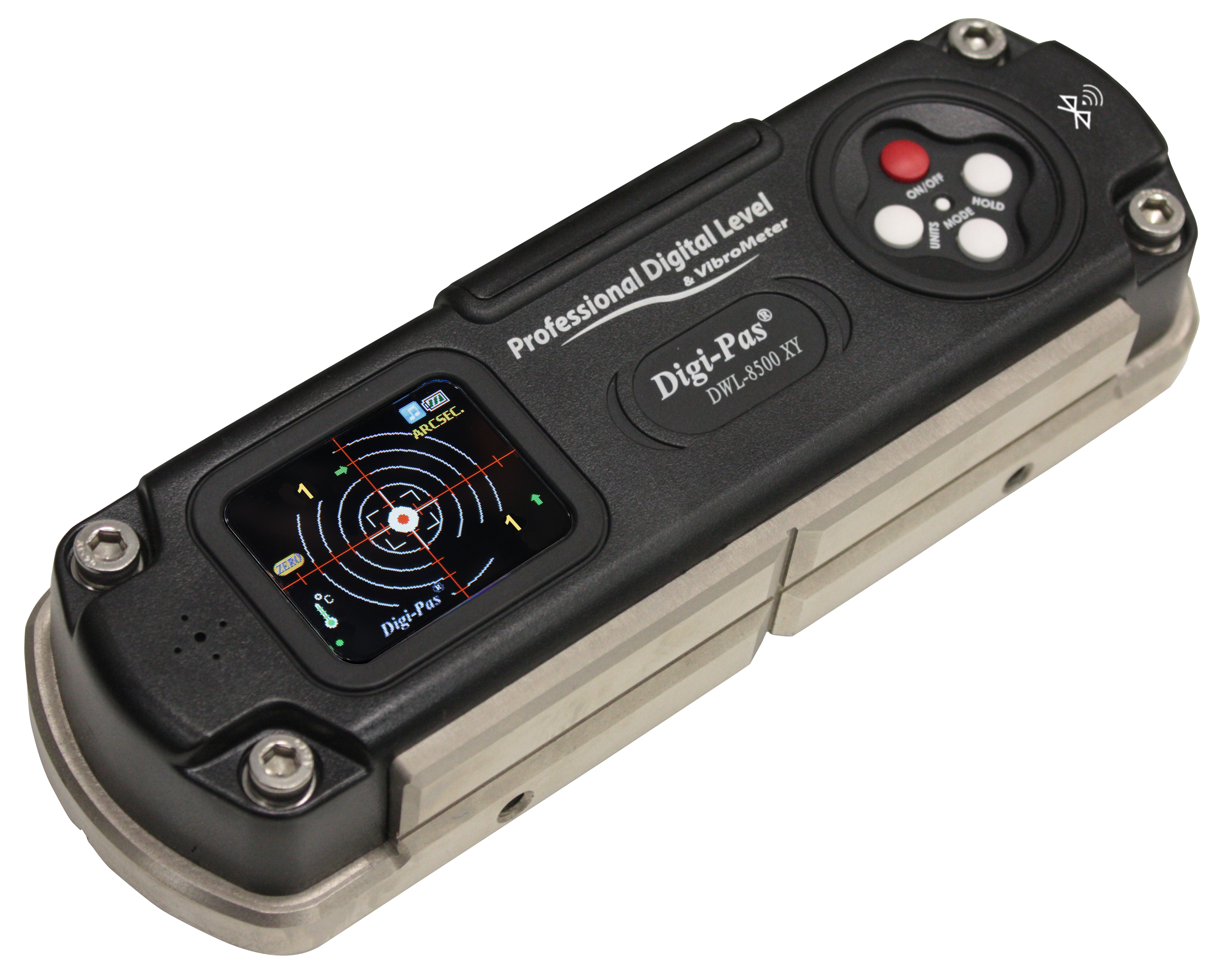
Two-axis digital inclinometer

Traditional spirit levels and pendulum-based electronic leveling instruments are usually constrained by only single-axis and narrow tilt measurement range. However, most precision leveling, angle measurement, alignment and surface flatness profiling tasks essentially involve a two-dimensional surface plane angle rather than two independent orthogonal single-axis objects. Two-axis inclinometers that are built with MEMS tilt sensors provides simultaneous two-dimensional angle readings of a surface plane tangent to earth datum.

Typical advantages of using two-axis MEMS inclinometers over conventional single-axis "bubble" or mechanical leveling instruments may include:

- Simultaneous measurement of two-dimensional (X-Y plane) tilt angles (i.e. pitch & roll), can eliminate tedious swapping back-and-forth experienced when using a single-axis level, for example to adjust machine footings to attain a precise leveling position.
- Digital compensation and precise calibration for non-linearity, for example for operating temperature variation, resulting in higher accuracy over a wider measurement range.
- The accelerometer sensors may generate numerical data in the form of vibration profiles to enable a machine installer to track and assess alignment quality in real-time and verify a structure's positional stability by comparing leveling profiles before and after it is set up.

== Inclinometer with gyroscope ==
As inclinometers measure the angle of an object with respect to the force of gravity, external accelerations like rapid motions, vibrations or shocks will introduce errors in the tilt measurements. To overcome this problem, it is possible to use a gyroscope in addition to an accelerometer. Any of the abovementioned accelerations have a huge impact on the accelerometer, but a limited effect on the measured rotation rates of the gyroscope. An algorithm can combine both signals to get the best value out of each sensor. This way it is possible to separate the actual tilt angle from the errors introduced by external accelerations.

== Applications ==
Symbol used in geotechnical drawings

Inclinometers are used for:

- Determining latitude using Polaris (in the Northern Hemisphere) or the two stars of the constellation Crux (in the Southern Hemisphere).
- Determining the angle of the Earth's magnetic field with respect to the horizontal plane.
- Showing a deviation from the true vertical or horizontal.
- Surveying, to measure an angle of inclination or elevation.
- Alerting an equipment operator that it may tip over.
- Measuring angles of elevation, slope, or incline, e.g. of an embankment.
- Measuring slight differences in slopes, particularly for geophysics. Such inclinometers are, for instance, used for monitoring volcanoes, or for measuring the depth and rate of landslide movement.
- Measuring movements in walls or the ground in civil engineering projects.
- Determining the dip of beds or strata, or the slope of an embankment or cutting; a kind of plumb level.
- Some automotive safety systems.
- Indicating pitch and roll of vehicles, nautical craft, and aircraft. See turn coordinator and slip indicator.
- Monitoring the boom angle of cranes and material handlers.
- Measuring the "look angle" of a satellite antenna towards a satellite.
- Adjusting a solar panel to the optimal angle to maximize its output.
- Measuring the slope angle of a tape or chain during distance measurement.
- Measuring the height of a building, tree, or other feature using a vertical angle and a distance (determined by taping or pacing), using trigonometry.
- Measuring the angle of drilling in well logging.
- Measuring the list of a ship in still water and the roll in rough water.
- Measuring steepness of a ski slope.
- Measuring the orientation of planes and lineations in rocks, in combination with a compass, in structural geology.
- Measuring range of motion in the joints of the body
- Measuring the inclination angle of the pelvis. Numerous neck and back measurements require the simultaneous use of two inclinometers.
- Measuring the angle of elevation, and ultimately computing the altitudes of, many things otherwise inaccessible for direct measurement.
- Measuring and fine tuning the angle of line array speaker hangs. Confirmation of the angle achieved via use of a laser built into the remote inclinometer.
- Setting correct orientation of solar panels while installing
- Setting firing angle of a cannon or gun (determines projectile range)
- Electronic games
- Help prevent unsafe working conditions.
- The USDA Forest Service uses tilt sensors (or inclinometers) to measure tree height in its Forest Inventory and Analysis program.
- Sharpening and measuring bevel angle.
- Logistics and transport also use tilt indicators, it is a specific system for single use. They are attached to the products during the shipping process.

== See also ==
- Grade (slope)
- Goniometer
- Hypsometer
- Liquid capacitive inclinometers
- Theodolite
- Tiltmeter
- Traverse and elevation
