= Spin (aerodynamics) =

Aviation term for a corkscrew downward path

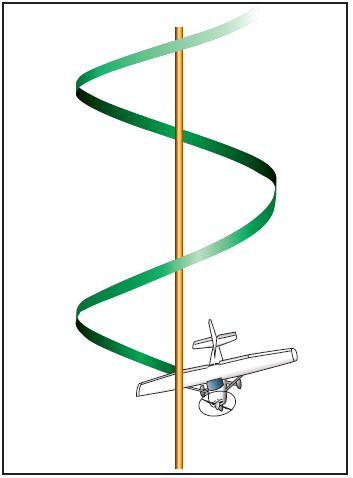
Spin — an aggravated stall and autorotation

In flight dynamics, a spin is a special category of stall resulting in autorotation (uncommanded roll) about the aircraft's longitudinal axis and a shallow, rotating, downward path approximately centred on a vertical axis. Spins can be entered intentionally or unintentionally, from any flight attitude if the aircraft has sufficient yaw while at the stall point. In a normal spin, the wing on the inside of the turn stalls while the outside wing remains flying. It is possible for both wings to stall, but the angle of attack of each wing, and consequently its lift and drag, are different.

Either situation causes the aircraft to autorotate toward the stalled wing due to its higher drag and loss of lift. Spins are characterized by high angle of attack, an airspeed below the stall on at least one wing and a shallow descent. Recovery and avoiding a crash may require a specific and counter-intuitive set of actions.

A spin differs from a spiral dive, in which neither wing is stalled and which is characterized by a low angle of attack and high airspeed. A spiral dive is not a type of spin because neither wing is stalled. In a spiral dive, the aircraft responds conventionally to the pilot's inputs to the flight controls, and recovery from a spiral dive requires a different set of actions from those required to recover from a spin.

In the early years of flight, a spin was frequently referred to as a "tailspin".

== How a spin occurs ==
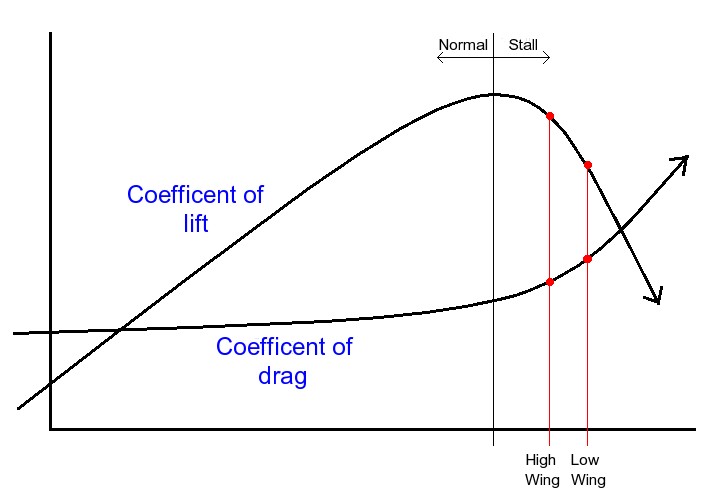
Aerodynamic spin diagram: lift and drag coefficients vs. angle of attack

Many types of airplanes spin only if the pilot simultaneously yaws and stalls the airplane (intentionally or unintentionally). Under these circumstances, one wing stalls, or stalls more deeply than the other. The wing that stalls first drops, increasing its angle of attack and deepening the stall. At least one wing must be stalled for a spin to occur. The other wing rises, decreasing its angle of attack, and the aircraft yaws towards the more deeply stalled wing. The difference in lift between the two wings causes the aircraft to roll, and the difference in drag causes the aircraft to continue yawing.

The spin characteristics diagram shown in this section is typical of an aircraft with moderate or high aspect ratio and little or no sweepback which leads to spin motion which is primarily rolling with moderate yaw. For a low aspect ratio swept wing with relatively large yaw and pitch inertia the diagram will be different and illustrates a predominance of yaw.

One common scenario that can lead to an unintentional spin is a skidding uncoordinated turn toward the runway during the landing sequence. A pilot who is overshooting the turn to final approach may be tempted to apply more rudder to increase the rate of turn. The result is twofold: the nose of the airplane drops below the horizon, and the bank angle increases due to rudder roll. Reacting to these unintended changes, the pilot then begins to pull the elevator control aft (thus increasing the angle of attack and load factor) while applying opposite aileron to decrease bank angle.

Taken to its extreme, this can result in an uncoordinated turn with sufficient angle of attack to cause the aircraft to stall. This is called a cross-control stall, and is very dangerous if it happens at low altitude where the pilot has little time to recover. To avoid this scenario, pilots learn the importance of always making coordinated turns. They may simply choose to make the final turn earlier and shallower to prevent an overshoot of the runway centre line and provide a larger margin of safety. Certificated, light, single-engine airplanes must meet specific criteria regarding stall and spin behavior. Spins are often entered intentionally for training, flight testing, or aerobatics.

== Phases ==
Incipient spin and recovery

In aircraft that are capable of recovering from a spin, the spin has four phases. At low altitude, spin recovery may also be impossible before impacting terrain, making low and slow aircraft especially vulnerable to spin-related accidents.

- Entry – The airplane is stalled by exceeding the wing's critical angle of attack, while allowing the aircraft to yaw, or by inducing yaw with rudder initiated skidding uncoordinated flight.
- Buffeting – At the critical angle of attack the boundary layer of airflow begins to separate from the wing airfoil, causing a loss of lift and resulting in oscillations of the control surfaces from turbulent airflow.
- Departure – The aircraft can no longer maintain steady flight in a stalled condition and deviates from its original flight-path.
- Post-stall gyration – The aircraft begins rotating about all three axes, the nose pitch attitude may fall, or in some cases rise, the aircraft begins yawing, and one wing drops.

Spins can be classified using the following descriptors:

- Incipient – With the inside wing stalled more deeply than the advancing wing, both the roll and yaw motions dominate.
- Developed – The aircraft's rotation rate, airspeed, and vertical speed are stabilized. One wing is stalled more deeply than the other as the aircraft spins downward along a corkscrew path.
- Recovery – With appropriate control inputs, the yaw rotation is slowed or stopped and the aircraft nose attitude is lowered, thus decreasing the wing's angle of attack and breaking the stall. Airspeed increases quickly in a nose low attitude and the aircraft is no longer in a spin. The controls respond conventionally and the airplane can be returned to normal flight.

== Modes ==
The U.S. National Aeronautics and Space Administration (NASA) has defined four different modes of spinning, defined by the angle of attack of the airflow on the wing.

NASA Spin Mode Classification
Spin mode	Angle-of-attack range, in degrees
Flat	65 to 90
Moderately flat	45 to 65
Moderately steep	30 to 45
Steep	20 to 30

During the 1970s, NASA used its spin tunnel at the Langley Research Center to investigate the spinning characteristics of single-engine general-aviation airplane designs. A 1/11-scale model was used with nine different tail designs.

Some tail designs that caused inappropriate spin characteristics had two stable spin modes—one steep or moderately steep, and another that was either moderately flat or flat. Recovery from the flatter of the two modes was usually less reliable or impossible. When the centre of gravity was further aft, the spin was flatter, and the recovery was less reliable. For all tests, the centre of gravity of the model was at either 14.5% of mean aerodynamic chord (MAC) or 25.5% of MAC.

Single-engine airplane types certified in the normal category must be demonstrated to recover from a spin of at least one turn, while single-engine aircraft certified in the utility category must demonstrate a six-turn spin that cannot be unrecoverable at any time during the spin due to pilot action or aerodynamic characteristic. NASA recommends various tail configurations and other strategies to eliminate the flatter of the two spin modes and make recovery from the steeper mode more reliable.

== History ==
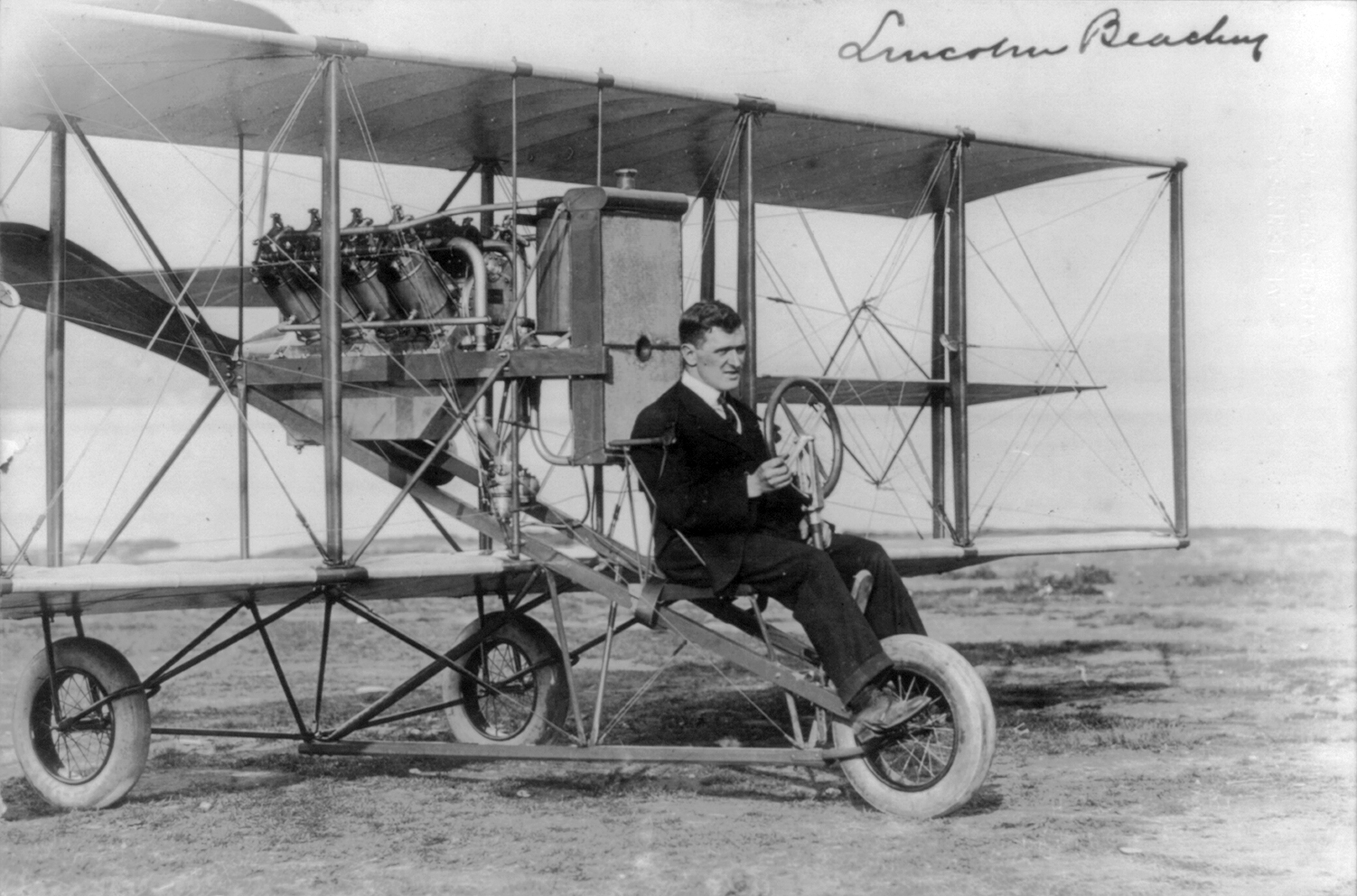
Lincoln Beachey with his plane

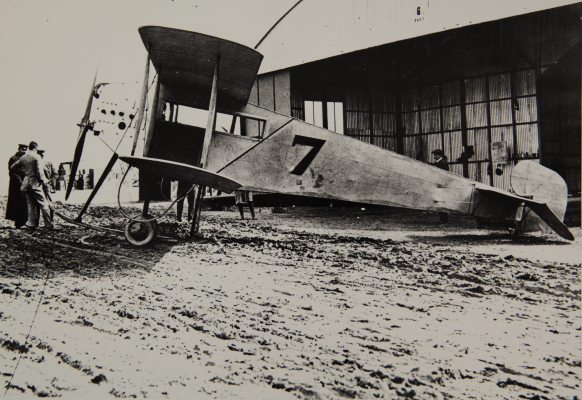
An Avro Type G

In aviation's early days, spins were poorly understood and often fatal. Proper recovery procedures were unknown, and a pilot's instinct to pull back on the stick served only to make a spin worse. Because of this, the spin earned a reputation as an unpredictable danger that might snatch an aviator's life at any time, and against which there was no defense. In early aviation, individual pilots explored spins by performing ad-hoc experiments (often accidentally), and aerodynamicists examined the phenomenon. Lincoln Beachey was able to exit spins at will, according to Harry Bruno in Wings over America (1944).

In August 1912, Lieutenant Wilfred Parke RN became the first aviator to recover from an accidental spin when his Avro Type G biplane entered a spin at 700 feet (210 m) AGL in the traffic pattern at Larkhill. Parke attempted to recover from the spin by increasing engine speed, pulling back on the stick, and turning into the spin, with no effect. The aircraft descended 450 feet (140 m), and horrified observers expected a fatal crash. Though disabled by centrifugal forces, Parke still sought an escape. In an effort to neutralize the forces pinning him against the right side of the cockpit, he applied full right rudder, and the aircraft leveled out 50 feet (15 m) above the ground. With the aircraft now under control, Parke climbed, made another approach, and landed safely.

In spite of the discovery of "Parke's technique", spin-recovery procedures were not a routine part of pilot training until well into World War I. The first documented case of an intentional spin and recovery is that of Harry Hawker. In the summer of 1914, Hawker recovered from an intentional spin over Brooklands, England, by centralizing the controls. Russian aviator Konstantin Artseulov, having independently discovered a recovery technique, somewhat different from Parke's and Hawker's, on the frontlines, demonstrated it in a dramatic display over the Kacha flight school's airfield on September 24, 1916, intentionally flying his Nieuport 21 into a spin and recovering from it twice. Later, Artseulov, at the time an instructor at the school, went on to teach this technique to all of his students, quickly disseminating it among the Russian aviators and beyond.

In 1917, the English physicist Frederick Lindemann conducted a series of experiments in a B.E.2E that led to the first understanding of the aerodynamics of the spin. In Britain, starting in 1917, spin recovery procedures were routinely taught by flight instructors at the Gosport School of Special Flying, while in France, at the School of Acrobacy and Combat, Americans who had volunteered to serve in the famous Lafayette Escadrille were by July 1917 learning how to do what the French called a vrille.

During the 1920s and 1930s, before night-flying instruments were commonly available on small aircraft, pilots were often instructed to enter a spin deliberately to avoid the much more dangerous graveyard spiral when they suddenly found themselves enveloped in clouds, hence losing visual reference to the ground. In almost every circumstance, the cloud deck ends above ground level, giving the pilot a reasonable chance to recover from the spin before crashing.

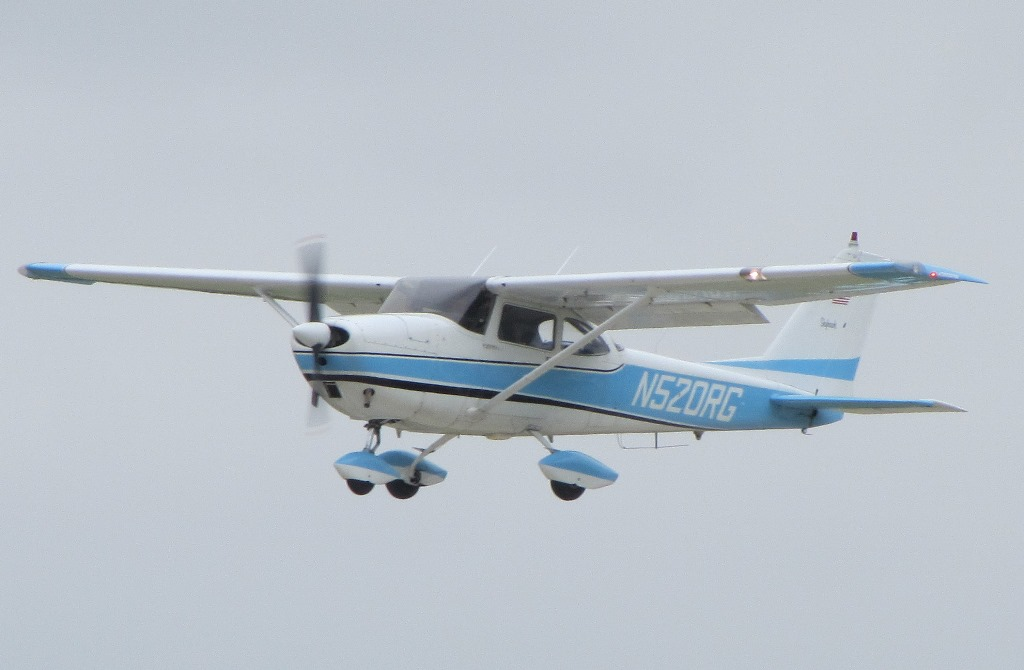
A 1963 Cessna 172D

Today, spin training is not required for a private pilot licence in the United States; added to this, most training-type aircraft are placarded "intentional spins prohibited". Some models of Cessna 172 are certified for spinning although they can be difficult to actually get into a spin. Generally, though, spin training is undertaken in an "Unusual attitude recovery course" or as a part of an aerobatics endorsement (though not all countries actually require training for aerobatics). However, understanding and being able to recover from spins is certainly a skill that a fixed-wing pilot could learn for safety. It is routinely given as part of the training in sailplanes, since gliders often operate slowly enough to be in near-stall conditions while turning. Because of this, in the U.S. demonstration of spin entry and recovery is still expected of glider instructor certification. Also, before their initial certifications, both airplane and glider instructors need a logbook endorsement of proficiency in spin training which, under Federal Aviation Regulations 61.183(i), may be given by another instructor. In Canada, spins are a mandatory exercise to get the private and commercial pilot licenses; Canadian recreational pilot permit candidates (1 level below private pilot license) must do a stall and wing drop (the very beginning of the entry to a spin) and must recover from a stall and wing drop as part of training.

== Entry and recovery ==
Some aircraft cannot be recovered from a spin using only their own flight control surfaces and must not be allowed to enter a spin under any circumstances. If an aircraft has not been certified for spin recovery, it should be assumed that spins are not recoverable and are unsafe in that aircraft. Important safety equipment, such as stall/spin recovery parachutes, which generally are not installed on production aircraft, are used during testing and certification of aircraft for spins and spin recovery.

Spin-entry procedures vary with the type and model of aircraft being flown but there are general procedures applicable to most aircraft. These include reducing power to idle and simultaneously raising the nose to induce an upright stall. Then, as the aircraft approaches stall, apply full rudder in the desired spin direction while holding full back-elevator pressure for an upright spin. Sometimes a roll input is applied in the direction opposite of the rudder (i.e., a cross-control).

If the aircraft manufacturer provides a specific procedure for spin recovery, that procedure must be used. Otherwise, to recover from an upright spin, the following generic procedure may be used: Power is first reduced to idle and the ailerons are neutralized. Then, full opposite rudder (that is, against the yaw) is added and held to counteract the spin rotation, and the elevator control is moved briskly forward to reduce the angle of attack below the critical angle. Depending on the airplane and type of spin, the elevator action could be a minimal input before rotation ceases, or in other cases the pilot may have to move the elevator control to its full forward position to effect recovery from the upright spin. Once the rotation has stopped, the rudder must be neutralized and the airplane returned to level flight. This procedure is sometimes called PARE, for Power idle, Ailerons neutral, Rudder opposite the spin and held, and Elevator through neutral.

The mnemonic "PARE" simply reinforces the tried-and-true NASA standard spin recovery actions—the very same actions first prescribed by NACA in 1936, verified by NASA during an intensive, decade-long spin test program overlapping the 1970s and '80s, and repeatedly recommended by the FAA and implemented by the majority of test pilots during certification spin-testing of light airplanes.

Inverted spinning and erect or upright spinning are dynamically very similar and require essentially the same recovery process but use opposite elevator control. In an upright spin, both roll and yaw are in the same direction, but an inverted spin is composed of opposing roll and yaw. It is crucial that the yaw be countered to effect recovery. The visual field in a typical spin (as opposed to a flat spin) is heavily dominated by the perception of roll over yaw, which can lead to an incorrect and dangerous conclusion that a given inverted spin is actually an erect spin in the reverse yaw direction (leading to a recovery attempt in which pro-spin rudder is mistakenly applied and then further exacerbated by holding the incorrect elevator input).

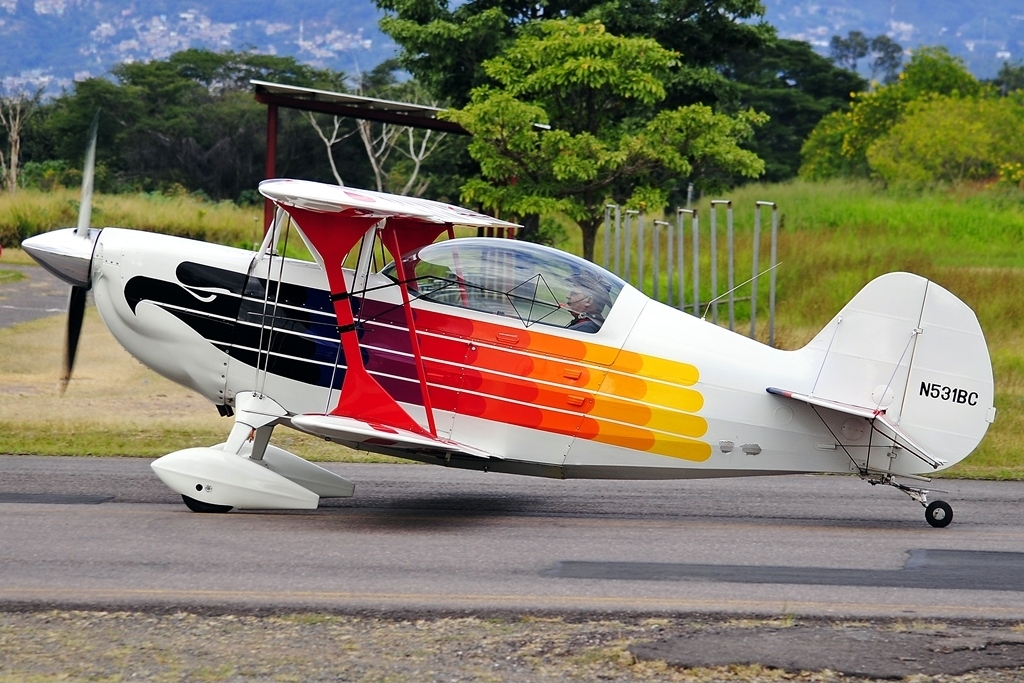
A Christen Eagle II

In some aircraft that spin readily upright and inverted, such as Pitts- and Christen Eagle-type high-performance aerobatic aircraft, an alternative spin-recovery technique may effect recovery as well, namely: Power off, Hands off the stick/yoke, Rudder full opposite to the spin (or more simply "push the rudder pedal that is hardest to push") and held (aka the Mueller/Beggs technique). An advantage of the Mueller/Beggs technique is that no knowledge of whether the spin is erect or inverted is required during what can be a very stressful and disorienting time. Even though this method does work in a specific subset of spin-approved airplanes, the NASA Standard/PARE procedure can also be effective provided that care must be taken to ensure the spin does not simply cross from positive to negative (or vice versa) and that a too-rapid application of elevator control is avoided as it may cause aerodynamic blanketing of the rudder rendering the control ineffective and simply accelerate the spin. The converse, however, may not be true at all—many cases exist where Beggs/Mueller fails to recover the airplane from the spin, but NASA Standard/PARE terminates the spin. Before spinning any aircraft, a pilot should consult the flight manual to establish if the particular aircraft type has any specific spin recovery techniques that differ from standard practice.

A pilot can induce a flat spin once the spin is established by applying full opposite aileron to the direction of rotation—hence, the requirement to neutralize ailerons in the normal spin recovery technique. The aileron application creates a differential induced drag that raises the nose toward a level pitch attitude. As the nose comes up the tail moves out farther from the centre of rotation increasing lateral airflow over the empennage. The increase in lateral flow across the vertical stabilizer/rudder brings it to its critical angle of attack stalling it. The normal recovery input of opposite rudder further increases angle of attack, deepening the tail stall and so rudder input is ineffective to slow/stop rotation. Recovery is initiated by maintaining pro-spin elevator and rudder and applying full aileron into the spin. Differential drag now lowers the nose returning the plane to a normal spin from which the PARE technique is used to exit the maneuver.

Although entry techniques are similar, modern military fighter aircraft often tend to require yet another variation on spin recovery techniques. While power is still typically reduced to idle thrust and pitch control neutralized, opposite rudder is almost never used. Adverse yaw created by the rolling surfaces (ailerons, differential horizontal tails, etc.) of such aircraft is often more effective in arresting the spin rotation than the rudder(s), which usually become blanked by the wing and fuselage due to the geometric arrangement of fighters. Hence, the preferred recover technique has a pilot applying full roll control in the direction of the rotation (i.e., a right-hand spin requires a right stick input), generally remembered as "stick into the spin". Likewise, this control application is reversed for inverted spins.

== Centre of gravity ==
The characteristics of an airplane with respect to spinning are significantly influenced by the position of the centre of gravity. In general terms, the further forward the centre of gravity the less readily the airplane will spin, and the more readily it can recover from a spin. Conversely, the further aft the centre of gravity the more readily the airplane will spin, and the less readily it can recover from a spin. In any airplane, the forward and aft limits on centre of gravity are carefully defined. In some airplanes that are approved for intentional spinning, the aft limit at which spins may be attempted is not as far aft as the aft limit for general flying.

Intentional spinning should not be attempted casually, and the most important pre-flight precaution is to determine that the airplane's centre of gravity is within the range approved for intentional spinning. For this reason, pilots should first determine what tendency the airplane has before it stalls. If the tendency is to pitch down (nose-heavy) when it stalls, then the aircraft is likely to recover on its own. However, if the tendency is to pitch up (tail-heavy) when it stalls, the aircraft will likely transition into a flat spin where stall recovery would be delayed, or it may not be recoverable at all.

Before practicing spins, one recommended method is to determine the aircraft's stall tendency by doing a pitch test. To do this, slowly reduce power to idle and see which way the nose pitches. If it pitches down, then the aircraft is stall recoverable. If the nose pitches up, then the stall would be difficult to recover or altogether unrecoverable. The pitch test should be done just prior to performing a spin maneuver.

== Unrecoverable spins ==
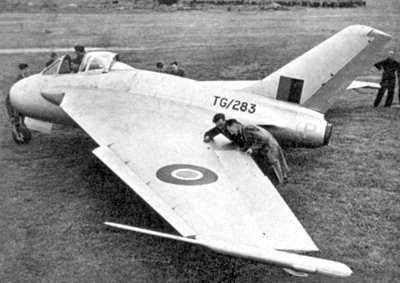
The missile-shaped objects on the wingtips of the DH 108 are containers for anti-spin parachutes.

If the centre of gravity of the airplane is behind the aft limit approved for spinning, any spin may prove unrecoverable except by using some special spin-recovery device such as a spin-recovery parachute specially installed in the tail of the airplane; or by jettisoning specially installed ballast at the tail of the airplane.

Some World War II airplanes were notoriously prone to spins when loaded erroneously; for example, the Bell P-39 Airacobra. The P-39 was an unusual design with the engine behind the pilot's seat and a large cannon in the front. Soviet pilots did numerous tests of the P-39 and were able to demonstrate its dangerous spinning characteristics.

Modern fighter aircraft are not immune to the phenomenon of unrecoverable spin characteristics. Another example of a nonrecoverable spin occurred in 1963, with Chuck Yeager at the controls of the NF-104A rocket-jet hybrid: during his fourth attempt at setting an altitude record, Yeager lost control and entered a spin, then ejected and survived. On the other hand, the Cornfield Bomber was a case where the ejection of the pilot shifted the centre of gravity enough to let the now-empty aircraft self-recover from a spin and land itself.

In purpose-built aerobatic aircraft, spins may be intentionally flattened through the application of power and aileron within a normal spin. Rotation rates experienced are dramatic and can exceed 400 degrees per second in an attitude that may even have the nose above the horizon. Such maneuvers must be performed with the centre of gravity in the normal range and with appropriate training, and consideration should be given to the extreme gyroscopic forces generated by the propeller and exerted on the crankshaft. Guinness World Records lists the highest number of consecutive inverted flat spins at 98, set by Spencer Suderman on March 20, 2016, flying an experimental variant of the Pitts S-1 designated the Sunbird S-1x. Suderman started from an altitude of 24,500 ft (7,500 m) and recovered at 2,000 ft (610 m).

== Aircraft design ==
For safety, all certificated, single-engine fixed-wing aircraft, including certificated gliders, must meet specified criteria regarding stall and spin behavior. Complying designs typically have a wing with greater angle of attack at the wing root than at the wing tip, so that the wing root stalls first, reducing the severity of the wing drop at the stall and possibly also allowing the ailerons to remain somewhat effective until the stall migrates outward toward the wing tip. One method of tailoring such stall behavior is known as washout. Some designers of recreational aircraft seek to develop an aircraft that is characteristically incapable of spinning, even in an uncoordinated stall.

Some airplanes have been designed with fixed leading edge slots. Where the slots are located ahead of the ailerons, they provide strong resistance to stalling and may even leave the airplane incapable of spinning.

The flight control systems of some gliders and recreational aircraft are designed so that when the pilot moves the elevator control close to its fully aft position, as in low speed flight and flight at high angle of attack, the trailing edges of both ailerons are automatically raised slightly so that the angle of attack is reduced at the outboard regions of both wings. This necessitates an increase in angle of attack at the inboard (centre) regions of the wing, and promotes stalling of the inboard regions well before the wing tips.

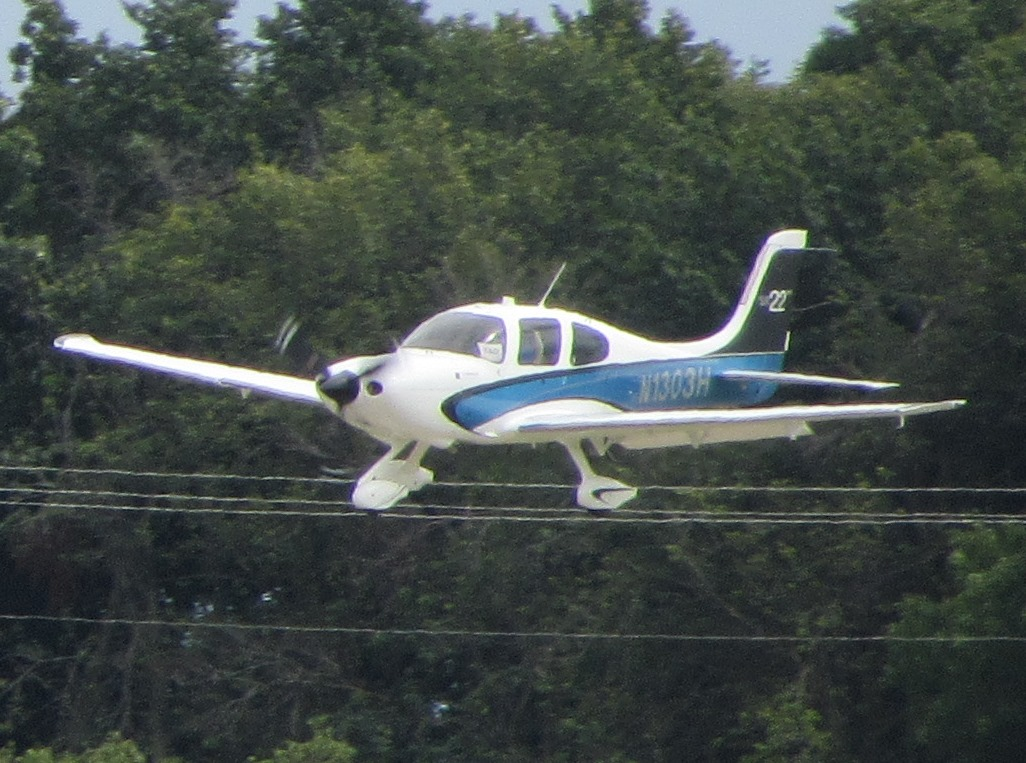
A Cirrus SR22

A US certification standard for civil airplanes up to 12,500 lb (5,700 kg) maximum takeoff weight is Part 23 of the Federal Aviation Regulations, applicable to airplanes in the normal, utility and acrobatic categories. Part 23, §23.221 requires that single-engine airplanes must demonstrate recovery from either a one-turn spin if intentional spins are prohibited or six-turn spins if intentional spins are approved. Even large, passenger-carrying single-engine airplanes like the Cessna Caravan must be subjected to one-turn spins by a test pilot and repeatedly demonstrated to recover within no more than one additional turn. With a small number of airplane types the FAA has made a finding of equivalent level of safety (ELOS) so that demonstration of a one-turn spin is not necessary. For example, this has been done with the Cessna Corvalis and the Cirrus SR20/22. Successful demonstration of the one-turn spin does not get an airplane approved for intentional spinning. To get an airplane approved for intentional spinning, a test pilot must repeatedly subject it to a spin of six turns and then demonstrate recovery within one and a half additional turns. Spin testing is a potentially hazardous exercise, and the test aircraft must be equipped with some spin-recovery device such as a tail parachute, jettisonable ballast, or some method of rapidly moving the centre of gravity forward.

Agricultural airplanes are typically certificated in the normal category at a moderate weight. For single-engine airplanes this requires successful demonstration of the one-turn spin. However, with the agriculture hopper full these airplanes are not intended to be spun, and recovery is unlikely. For this reason, at weights above the maximum for the normal category, these airplanes are not subjected to spin testing and, as a consequence, can only be type certificated in the restricted category. As an example of an agricultural airplane, see the Cessna AG series.

== Spin kit ==
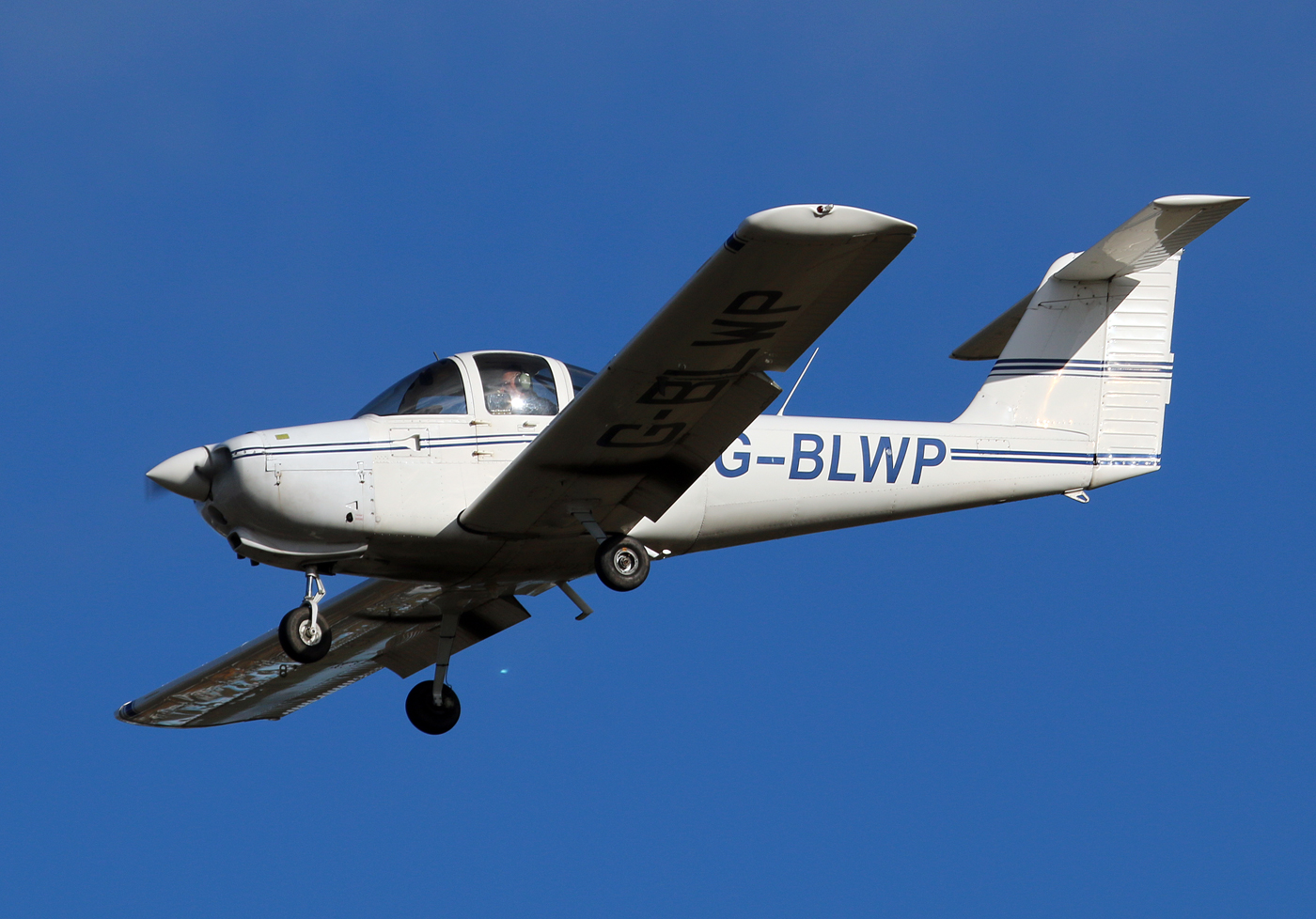
A Piper Tomahawk

To make some sailplanes spin easily for training purposes or demonstrations, a spin kit is available from the manufacturer.

Many training aircraft may appear resistant to entering a spin, even though some are intentionally designed and certified for spins. A well-known example of an aircraft designed to spin readily is the Piper Tomahawk, which is certified for spins, though the Piper Tomahawk's spin characteristics remain controversial. Aircraft that are not certified for spins may be difficult or impossible to recover once the spin exceeds the one-turn certification standard.

Though spinning has been removed from most flight training courses, some countries still require flight training on spin recovery. The U.S. requires spin training for civilian flight instructor candidates and military pilots. A spin occurs only after a stall, so the FAA emphasizes training pilots in stall recognition, prevention, and recovery as a means to reduce accidents due to unintentional stalls or spins.

A spin is often intimidating to the uninitiated, however many pilots trained in spin entry and recovery find that the experience builds awareness and confidence. In a spin, the occupants of the airplane only feel reduced gravity during the entry phase and then experience normal gravity, except that the extreme nose-down attitude presses the occupants forward against their restraint harnesses. The rapid rotation, combined with the nose-down attitude, results in a visual effect called ground flow that can be disorienting.

The recovery procedure from a spin requires using rudder to stop the rotation, then elevator to reduce angle of attack to stop the stall, then pulling out of the dive without exceeding the maximum permitted airspeed (VNE) or maximum G loading. The maximum G loading for a light airplane in the normal category is usually 3.8 G. For a light airplane in the acrobatic category it is usually at least 6 G.

== See also ==
- Falling leaf – A post-stall, pre-spin maneuver
