= Skid (aerodynamics) =

Aircraft misdirection due to rudder overcompensation

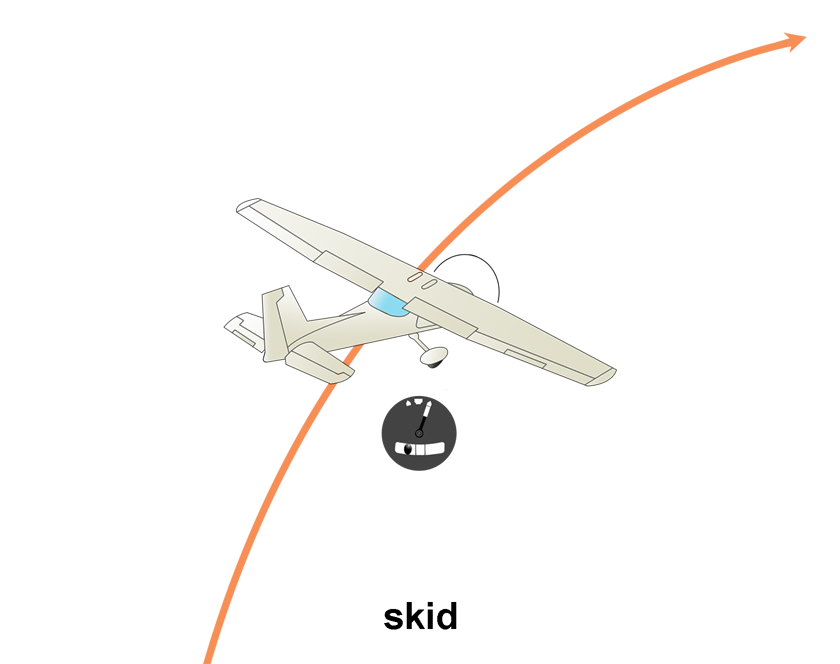
Airplane in a right turn skid

In a straight flight, the tail of the airplane aligns the fuselage into the relative wind. However, in the beginning of a turn, when the ailerons are being applied in order to bank the airplane, the ailerons also cause an adverse yaw of the airplane. For example, if the airplane is rolling clockwise (from the pilot point of view), the airplane yaws to the left. It assumes a crab-like attitude relative to the wind. This is called a slip. The air is flowing crosswise over the fuselage. In order to correct this adverse slip, the pilot must apply rudder (right rudder in this example). If the pilot applies too much rudder, the airplane will then slip to the other side. This is called a skid.

== Stall ==
The skid is more dangerous than the slip if the airplane is close to a stall. In the slip, the raised wing — the left one if the airplane is turning to the right — will stall before the lowered one, and the airplane will reduce the bank angle, which prevents the stall. In the skid, the lowered wing will stall before the raised one, and the airplane will tighten the turn, and the stall can develop to a spin.

At high altitudes, there is plenty of space for recovery. But during the final approach, when the airplane is close to the ground, a stall-spin accident is often fatal. A common cause of this accident is to enter a skidding turn in the airfield traffic pattern on the turn from base leg to final approach, unconsciously using excessive rudder in an attempt to tighten the turn and avoid overshooting the runway centreline.

== Deliberate skid ==
Turn coordinators indicating different kinds of turns

Deliberate skids are used in aerobatics and aerial combat. Deliberate slips done with vigorous application of roll and opposite rudder (lower the right wing and step on the left rudder) can be used as a dive brake. By balancing the roll's turn to the right with the rudder's yaw to the left, the plane continues to fly straight ahead but it presents its side rather than its nose to the airstream. The drag from this aerodynamically "dirty", clumsy position slows the otherwise sleek airplane. By modulating the amount of skid with rudder and aileron, the pilot can modulate the braking. Thus the plane can be slowed quickly in level flight or the descent to a landing can be dramatically steepened while holding the approach speed to a desired value.

== See also ==
- Slip (aerodynamic)
