= Tell-tale (sailing) =

Tool for judging wind direction on a sailboat

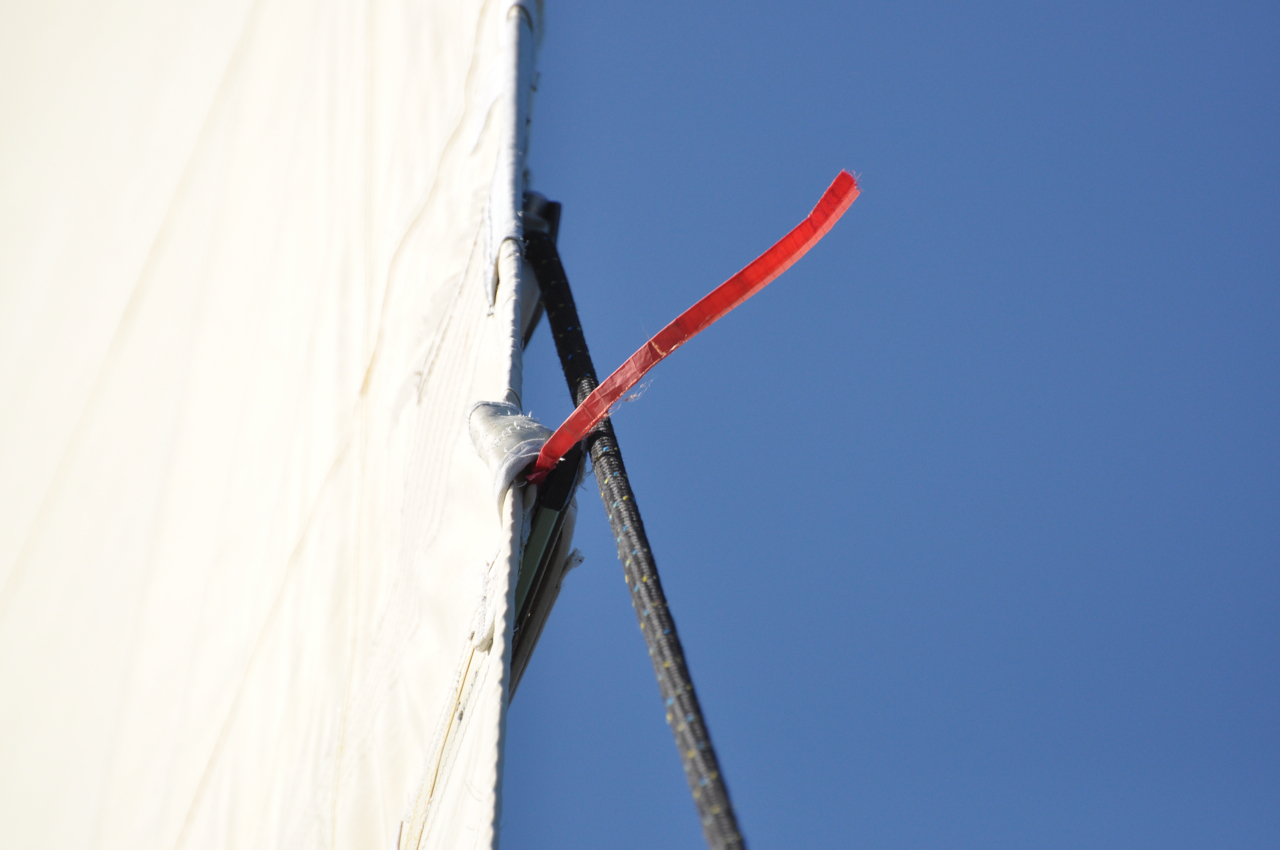
A tell-tale connected to a sail

A tell-tale or telltale, in a nautical or sailing context, is a piece of yarn or fabric attached to a sail, a stay, or any rigging on a sailboat. Typically, a tell-tale is on a port and a starboard stay.

Tell-tales attached to a sail are used as a guide for trimming (adjusting) a sail. On the mainsail tell-tales may be placed on the leech (aft edge) and when trimmed properly should be streaming backwards while on a beat (upwind). When placed on the luff (forward or mast edge of the mainsail) they are used to indicate that the sail is luffing or coming head to wind. The solution is to bear away from the wind or sheet in.

On the jib there may be tell-tales on both sides of the luff of the sail. As a general guide, the windward tell-tale should stream aft (backwards) with an occasional lift, the leeward front tell-tale should stream aft when on a beat to windward. If one tell-tale begins to spiral, it is indicating the sail has detached air flow on that side. To correct this the sail needs to move towards the opposite side. "Tiller to tattling tail" is a good phrase to remember which direction to push the tiller when the tail is spiraling. Alternatively, the sail itself can be sheeted in or out towards the tell-tale which is not streaming. For example, a luffing windward telltale would indicate an under-trimmed sail, requiring the crew to sheet in that sail. A luffing leeward telltale would indicate an over-trimmed sail, requiring the crew to ease the sheets for that sail.

== Types ==
There are three types of telltale:

1. Draft telltales are positioned either side of the sail usually around the deepest part of the sail.
2. Leech telltales are positioned on the leach of the sail
3. Shroud telltales are attached to a boat's shrouds

Draft telltales tend to be made from wool. Leech and shroud telltales are usually made from ribbon.

== Reading draft telltales ==
If the sails are under-trimmed or the vessel is pointing too high then the telltales on the inside of the sail will stall/lift whilst the ones on the outside will stream aft. If the sails are over-trimmed or the vessel is sailing too low then the telltales on the outside of the sail will stall/lift whilst the inside ones will stream aft.

== Tell-tale compass ==
A tell-tale compass or repeating compass is a special compass installed in the ceiling of a cabin, and can be read from below or above deck. According to Moby-Dick, a tell-tale refers to the cabin-compass, "because without going to the compass at the helm, the captain, while below, can inform himself of the course of the ship."
