= SS Canastota =

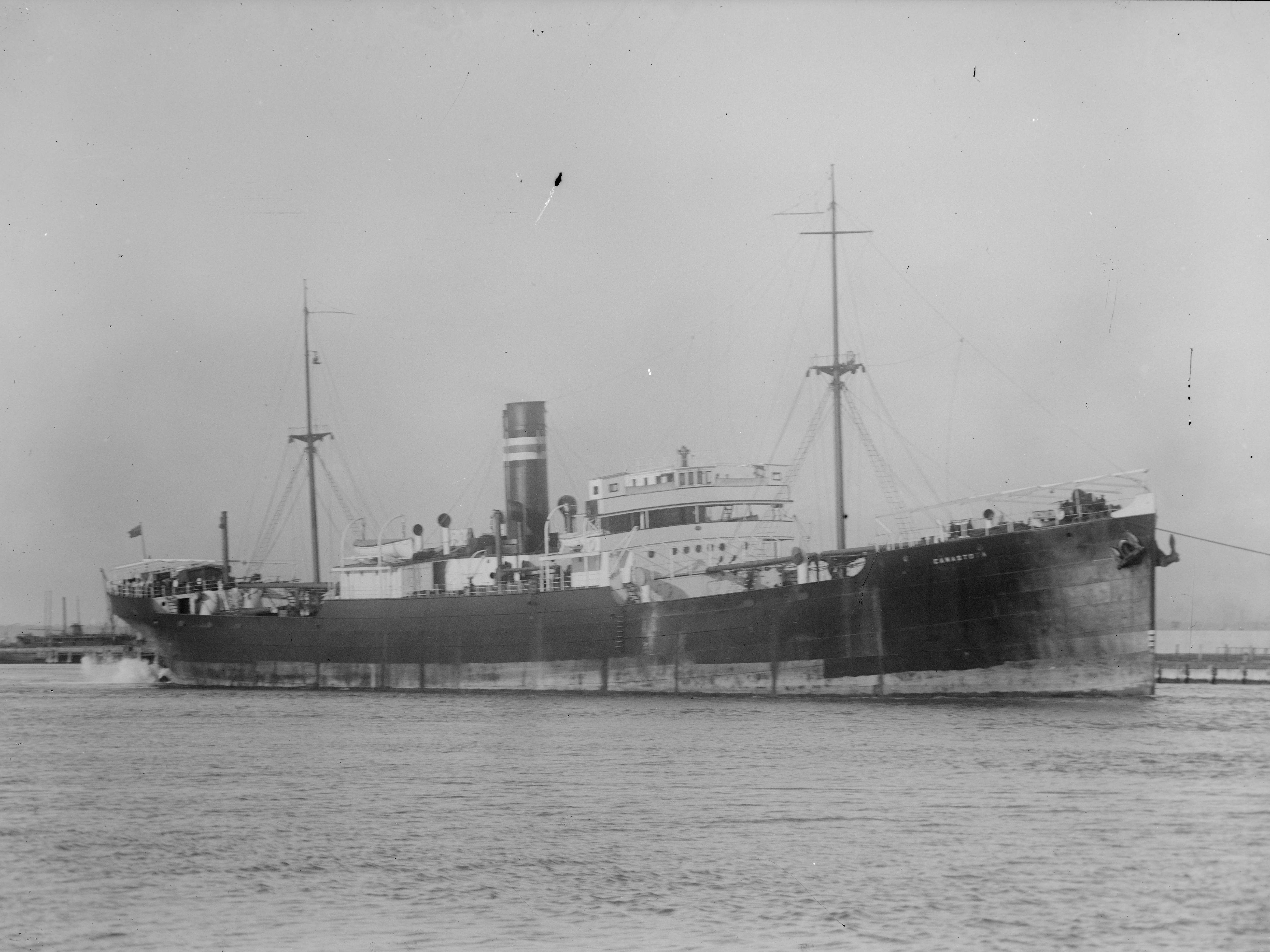
- SS Canastota

History
- Name: Canastota
- Completed: 1907
- Out of service: 1921
- Identification: 124242
- Fate: Disappeared after leaving Sydney, Australia en route for Wellington, New Zealand

General characteristics
- Tonnage: 4,904 GRT; 3,139 NRT
- Length: 405.0 ft (123.4 m)
- Beam: 52.3 ft (15.9 m)
- Depth: 18.5 ft (5.6 m)
- Speed: 11.5 knots (average speed)

SS Canastota (formerly Falls of Orchy) was a British-flagged, coal-burning, two-masted, steel screw, cargo steamer. She was built in 1907 as Falls of Orchy at Napier & Miller's Old Kilpatrick Yard, Glasgow, Scotland, for the Falls Line. She was sold in 1914 and briefly owned by the New Zealand Shipping Company She was renamed Canastota when purchased by the Canastota Steamship Co in 1915. Canastota was last seen on 13 June 1921, leaving Sydney, Australia bound for Wellington, New Zealand. Although almost forgotten today, Canastota's loss was a major news item in Australia and New Zealand during the second half of 1921.

SS Canastota is not to be confused with:

- USS Canastota (PC-1135), a World War II submarine chaser; or
- another ship, a U.S. Navy tug with a similar sounding name, USS Conestoga, that also disappeared in 1921.

== Earlier voyages ==
=== Voyages of Falls of Orchy ===
Falls of Orchy was launched on 9 October 1907. In June 1908, she sailed from Norfolk, Virginia, for Auckland and by August 1908 had been chartered to carry coal from Newcastle to the West Coast of the United States.

In December 1908, the ship arrived from Manila at Newcastle to load coal destined for the Philippines and one of the crew was found to be infected with smallpox. The ship was sent to Sydney and the entire crew and the Newcastle harbour pilot were admitted to the North Head Quarantine Station, while a relief crew took the ship back to Newcastle to be loaded. The ship then returned to Sydney and the original crew took over.

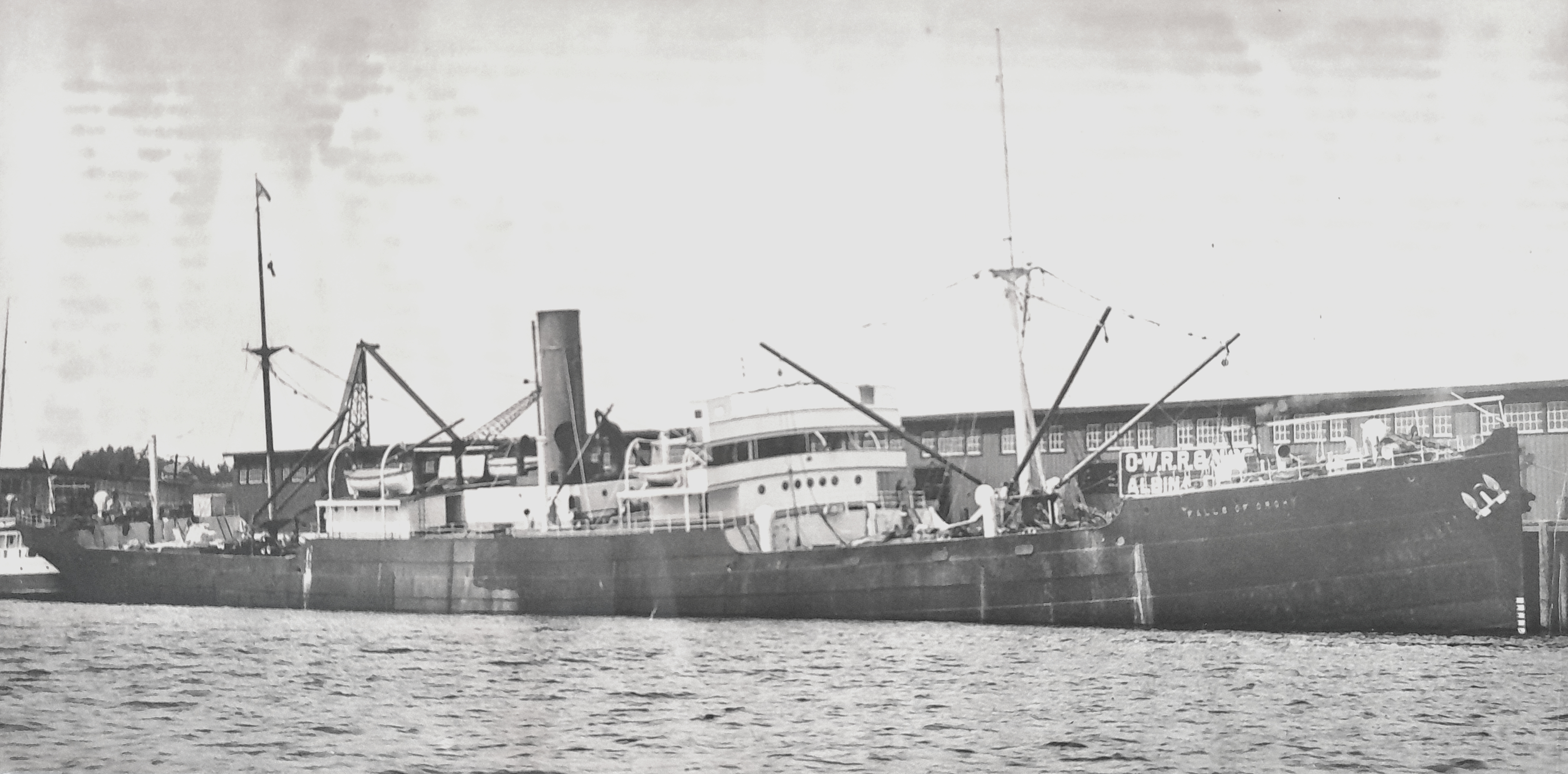
A rare photograph of Falls of Orchy. The ship is shown berthed at Portland, Oregon. The image dates from between 1910 and 1915.

In February 1909, the ship arrived at Brisbane towing the steamer River Clyde. That ship had run out of coal and, after then using wood from her hold ceiling and bulkheads to fuel her boilers, had been adrift 120 miles (190 km) east of Brisbane.

In June 1909, the ship came off the Newcastle-Manila run and was to be sent to Vladivostok to load for UK ports. From around July 1911, Falls of Orchy carried "case oil" from the United States to New Zealand ports for the Vacuum Oil Company. In March 1912, she was loading wheat for the UK at Wallaroo, South Australia, and in July 1912 was on the Tyne. The ship also visited Portland, Oregon, berthing at a wharf of the Oregon-Washington Railroad & Navigation Company's vast Albina Yard, on the eastern bank of the Willamette River.

It was reported in August 1914 that Falls of Orchy had been sold to the New Zealand Shipping Company. In 1915, she was sold again, and renamed Canastota.

=== Voyages of Canastota ===
From 1915 onward, Canastota was on the run from the east coast of the United States to Australia and New Zealand, via the newly opened Panama Canal. During this time, she was chartered by the United States & Australia Line of New York.

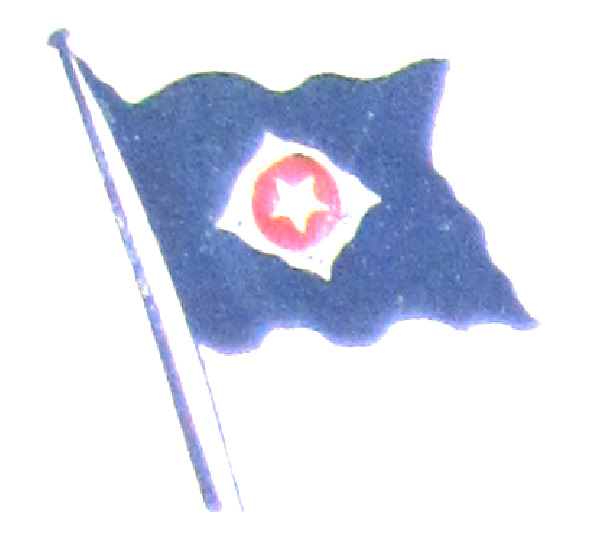
Flag of U.S. & A. Line.

On her first voyage to Australia as Canastota in 1915, the ship carried transformers and components for power lines associated with the Waddamana Hydro-Electric Power Station in Tasmania.

That first voyage did not begin well. On 7 May 1915, while the ship was still alongside Pier 37, Atlantic Basin, at the foot of Pioneer Street, Brooklyn, a part of Canastota's cargo, stored in No.5 hold of the ship, caught fire. The smoke coming from the hatch was so dense that the firemen were unable to enter the hold. Crucially, the fire did not reach the 10,000 gallons of 'benzine' that were already on-board, in No.3 hold. Even so, the holds had to be flooded to extinguish the fire, leaving the ship's bow resting on the mud. The vessel was damaged and needed significant structural repairs before being able to leave for Australia after a delay of some weeks. There was a further delay due to a landslide in the Culebra Cut, part of the then newly-opened Panama Canal.

In early 1916, during World War I, she was taken off the United States to Australia run and used to transport Canadian troops and also as a collier and food supply vessel. One of her crew, who drowned in Genoa Harbour, on 24 April 1918, was buried in the Staglieno Cemetery.

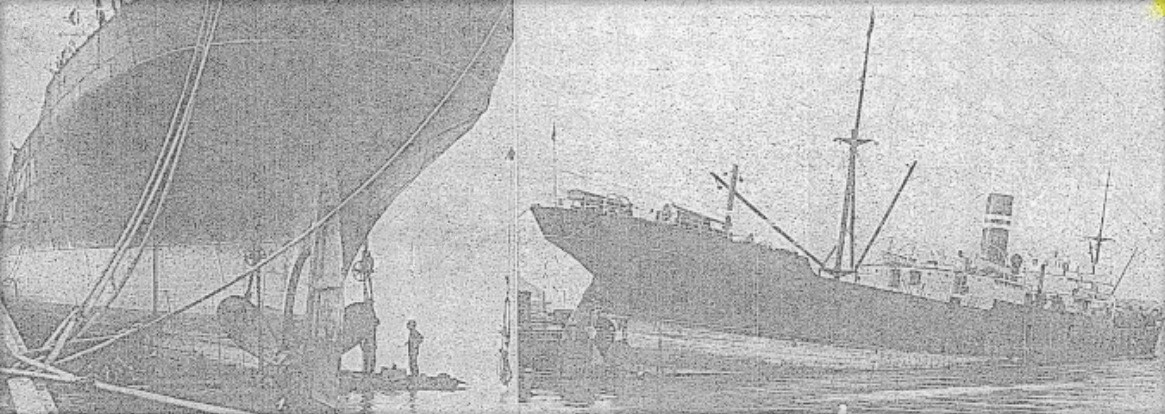
SS Canastota undergoing tail-shaft repairs in Auckland Harbour, in 1920.

From 1919 to 1921, she ran a service from the ports of New York and Boston on the east coast of the United States to Australian ports—via the Panama Canal and Suva in Fiji—making the return journey, via New Zealand—Wellington or Auckland—and Suva, for the United States & Australia Line.

In 1920, the ship experienced problems with her tail-shaft bearings. She was repaired in Auckland Harbour, without entering a dry dock, by first shifting her cargo forward so that her propeller and tail-shaft gland were clear of the water.

== Last voyage ==
Canastota left New York on 6 March 1921, with a new master, Captain Andrew Joseph Lockie, who had taken over the command on 15 February 1921 while the ship was in New York. Lockie, a New Zealander, was born in 1883 and received his master's certificate (NZ953), in 1909. He held the Mercantile Marine War Medal, for his service in the Merchant Navy, during the First World War. He resided at Willoughby in Sydney, with his German-born wife Caroline (née Borgolte), and their two children. Up to July 1918, Captain Lockie briefly had been the master of the four-masted barquentine Lyman D. Foster—a ship with a colourful history—that later disappeared, in March 1919, between Nukuʻalofa in Tonga and San Francisco, carrying a cargo of copra. Earlier, he had been an officer on Union Company ships and captain of the Auckland Harbour Board pilot boat.

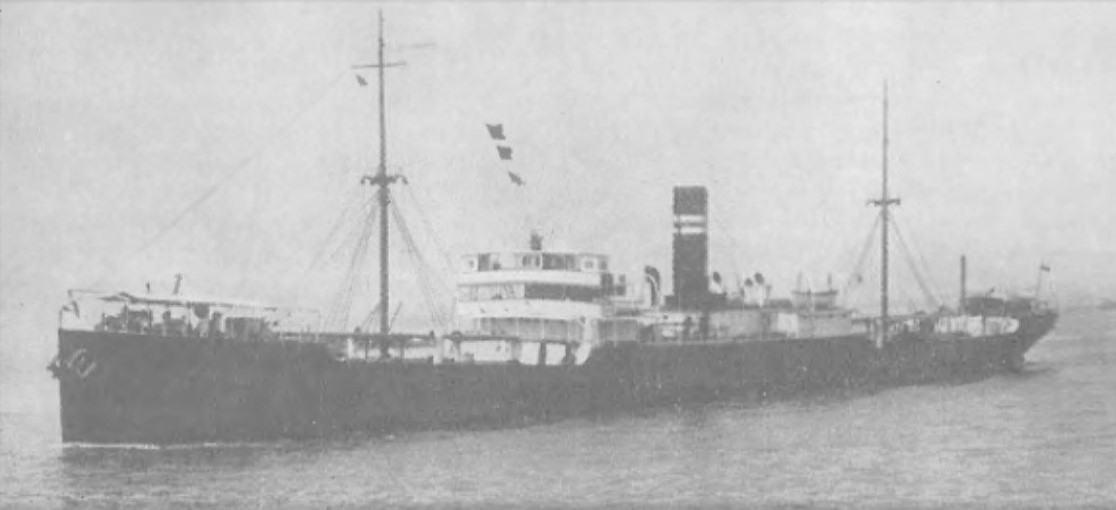
SS Canastota at sea.

She took on American bunker coal at Cristóbal, on the Caribbean side of Panama then passed through the Panama Canal. She next called at Suva, Fiji, where she unloaded some 'case-oil' and transferred numerous birds, animals and reptiles to the A.U.S.N. Co. steamer Levuka (bound for Sydney) together with a passenger, the owner of the creatures, Ellis Stanley Joseph, a wildlife importer and exporter. On 18 April 1921, Mr. Joseph's menagerie reached Sydney safely, on Levuka, and was divided between Taronga Zoo and Melbourne Zoo.

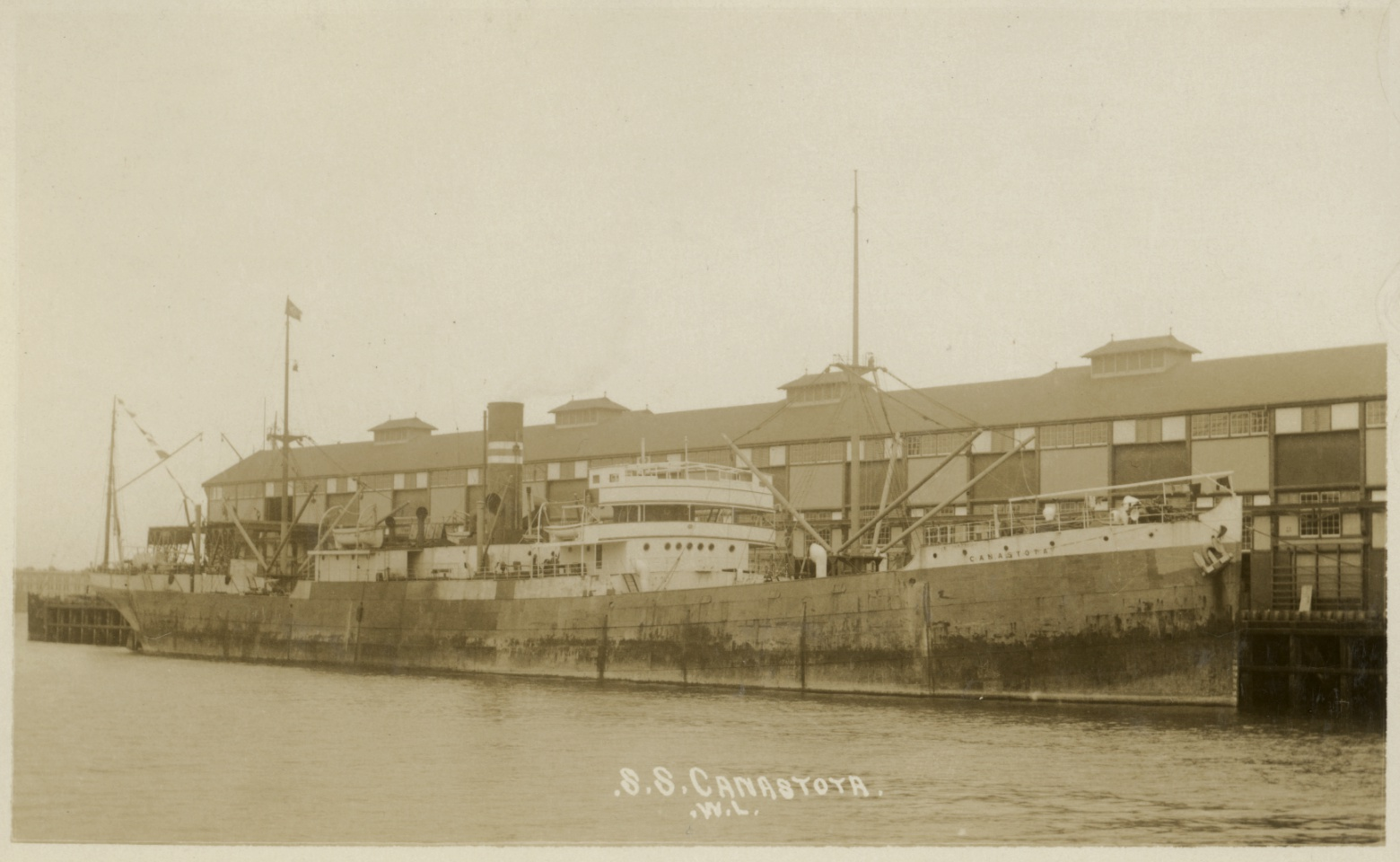
SS Canastota, at Woolloomooloo Wharf No.8, on Sydney Harbour, date unknown

Canastota left Suva on 18 April 1921 and reached Australia on 24 April 1921, with Cairns being the first Australian port of call. She subsequently called at Townsville, then Rockhampton (Port Alma), Brisbane (Bulimba) and Newcastle, where she moored at Kings Wharf and then moved to take on bunker coal at 'the Basin', before arriving at Sydney at 1:10 a.m. on 3 June 1921. While in Sydney, she was berthed at Woolloomooloo Wharf No.7.

The captain's wife boarded Canastota at Port Alma and remained on board until the ship reached Sydney; permission had been refused for her to continue on the ship and accompany her husband to America. Mrs Lockie, who intended to relocate the family to New York, then booked herself and her two children to leave Sydney in July 1921, on another ship, Makura. The captain's father, James Lockie, and his mother came from Northcote in New Zealand to visit their son and his family while Canastota was in Sydney. While the ship was in Sydney, two new officers joined the crew.

She had been expected to depart on 11 June 1921. but it was in the evening of Monday 13 June 1921 that Canastota left Port Jackson (Sydney Harbour) bound for Wellington, New Zealand. The ship was never heard from again.

At the time of her disappearance, Canastota had a crew of 49 men and was carrying mail destined for Wellington and a highly flammable cargo.

Flotsam from Canastota was washed up on Lord Howe Island during July 1921 but, otherwise, there was no trace of her. Some of the flotsam was charred.

The committee of Lloyd's, at their meeting on 17 August 1921, posted Canastota as missing, with the presumption that the ship had burnt at sea.

== Initial fears ==
Canastota should have reached Wellington after five days steaming from Sydney. When Canastota had not arrived at Wellington by Saturday 18 June 1921, fears first began to be held for the overdue ship. These fears were compounded by the complete absence of radio contact with the ship, from the time it left Sydney. At a time when many ships had no radio equipment, Canastota was equipped with a relatively modern and powerful radio transmitter, a two-kilowatt American Marconi quenched spark-gap transmitter.

It was first thought possible that Canastota may have experienced engine troubles and was adrift but the absence of any radio contact was ominous. There was conjecture that the Canastota's wireless equipment was faulty—or was partially faulty with a limited range—but that was denied by the ship's Sydney agent. The father of the ship's captain said that his son had promised to send him a radio message, on either the evening of Tuesday 14 June or the morning of Wednesday 15 June 1921, but that message was never received. The captain's father's view was that Canastota had met with a mishap serious enough to have rendered the ship's radio ineffective, within two days of leaving Sydney.

In an article in The Newcastle Sun of 25 June 1921 a relative of one of the engineers of the Canastota was quoted as saying:

"My own opinion is that the she has become a total loss through an explosion of her benzine cargo. If that is so, the crew may be in the open boats in mid ocean".

By late June 1921, the quoted rate for Canastota on the reinsurance market at Lloyd's rose to "60 guineas per cent" ('per cent' meaning 'per 100 pounds of cargo value'). There was an increasing apprehension that Canastota had been lost with all hands.

== The search for Canastota ==
On 24 June 1921, the New Zealand based cruiser HMS Chatham left Wellington in search of Canastota. Chatham "went as far to westward as her coal would permit, and a look-out was kept aloft all day, while searchlights were going continuously at night", returning on 30 June without seeing any sign of the overdue ship.

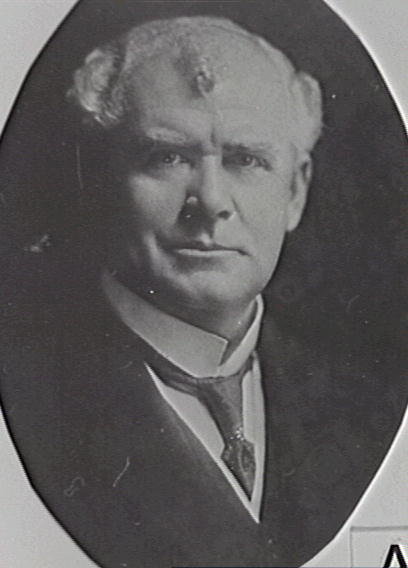
George Arthur Parkes, shipping agent for SS Canastota, 1926.

Aside from that search by Chatham, there was little government involvement in the search, which was conducted largely by merchant vessels at the behest of Canastota's shipping agent in Sydney, George Arthur Parkes, the grandnephew of politician Henry Parkes.

On 24 June a radio message was sent from Sydney, "To all ships: Keep a sharp lookout for Canastota. and report immediately first tidings." This was sent as was a general call, the signal of which would immediately stop all other communication between ship and land stations. The message would reach all ships and stations west of Suva, and would cover the route over which the overdue vessel would travel. This message was sent after a request to the Navigation Department in Sydney was made by Parkes on 22 June 1921.

Steamers leaving New Zealand ports were instructed to deviate from their course to search for Canastota. SS Marama, from Sydney en route to San Francisco, via Auckland, had instructions to deviate from the usual track and keep a sharp lookout for Canastota. Three of the Union cargo ships — Waipori, Kurow, and Kererangu — which left Newcastle for New Zealand ports, also joined in the search. The Union Company's cargo steamer Waihora coming from Wellington to Newcastle saw no sign of Canastota.

In Sydney, a representative of Parkes interviewed the skippers of two steamers bound for New Zealand—Riverina for Auckland and Ulimaroa, for Wellington—prior to their sailing on 23 June. Both ships' captains promised to keep a particularly strict lookout. Parkes also made arrangements with the Union Steamship Co. of N.Z. for its steamers Maheno and Manuka—both leaving Sydney on 1 July 1921 bound for New Zealand ports—to join the search.

Maheno had arrived in Sydney on 27 June 1921, after sighting a ship's hatch cover floating about 200 miles (320 km) east of Sydney on 26 June 1921. This was reported in some newspapers as being a sighting of possible wreckage from Canastota. Most newspaper articles on the subject did not connect the hatch cover to Canastota. Maheno's crew was not able to recover the hatch cover on account of being at full speed. It was an ominous sign but proved to be a false one. Captain Brown of Maheno also reported to his employers, the Union Steamship Co. of New Zealand, that the hatch was of a type found only on a sailing vessel and so could not be from Canastota. This fact was not advised to the authorities by the shipping line until 10 August 1921.

There was another false sign, when some barrels and an oil drum were washed ashore at Freshwater Beach near Sydney, on 26 June. The ship's agent stated that the items were not of a kind matching Canastota's cargo. Officers of the Navigation Department concluded that the flotsam was from the deck cargo of a coastal ship, probably Burringbar.

If wreckage were to be found washed up on land, a likely place to find it would be Lord Howe Island, based on the prevailing current in the Tasman Sea. East of Sydney, the warm part of the East Australian Current changes direction, and then separates into two streams that flow on either side of Lord Howe Island.

The steamer Drafn, which left Thio for Sydney on 8 July 1921, deviated from its usual course to search the vicinity of Norfolk Island and Lord Howe Island, without success.

The French steamer Saint Joseph, en route to Newcastle from Nouméa with a cargo of manganese ore, called at Norfolk Island on 10 July 1921. While there, her captain received orders from the Administrator to search for Canastota in the neighborhood of Lord Howe Island, instead of proceeding directly to its destination. Ball's Pyramid was passed at 9 p.m. on 11 July, and the vessel cruised about until daylight. On the following morning, Ball's Pyramid and the adjacent rocks, the west coast of Lord Howe Island, and the north islets were visited. Nothing was discovered.

When Saint Joseph arrived at the east coast of Lord Howe Island, the inhabitants were seen to have made a fire and the ship's anchor was dropped. Some of the islanders came on board but they did not have any news of Canastota. The residents said that there was no derelict or wrecked ship on the easterly reefs but, until the visit of Saint Joseph, the small island community had been unaware that Canastota was missing.

Saint Joseph was not equipped with a radio and so Captain G. Chariot could not report that he had no news of Canastota, until Saint Joseph arrived at Newcastle on the morning of 14 July 1921. It was reported by The Newcastle Sun that, when asked for his opinion of Canastota's fate, Captain Chariot pointed downward and said, "New steamer, not much wood, all would go down", before adding that his opinion was that Canastota had blown up suddenly.

West Wind—another steamer of the U.S. & A Line—searched for Canastota during her eight-day passage from Wellington to Brisbane and reported upon arrival on 18 July 1921 that it had seen nothing. Nothing else was heard concerning Canastota, during the last weeks of July 1921.

The quoted rate for Canastota on the reinsurance market at Lloyd's had risen to "95 guineas per cent" ('per cent' meaning 'per 100 pounds of cargo value')—95 guineas being equivalent to £99 15s—by 20 July 1921, when her risk was withdrawn as being uninsurable.

== Remnants found ==
=== Flotsam found at Lord Howe Island ===
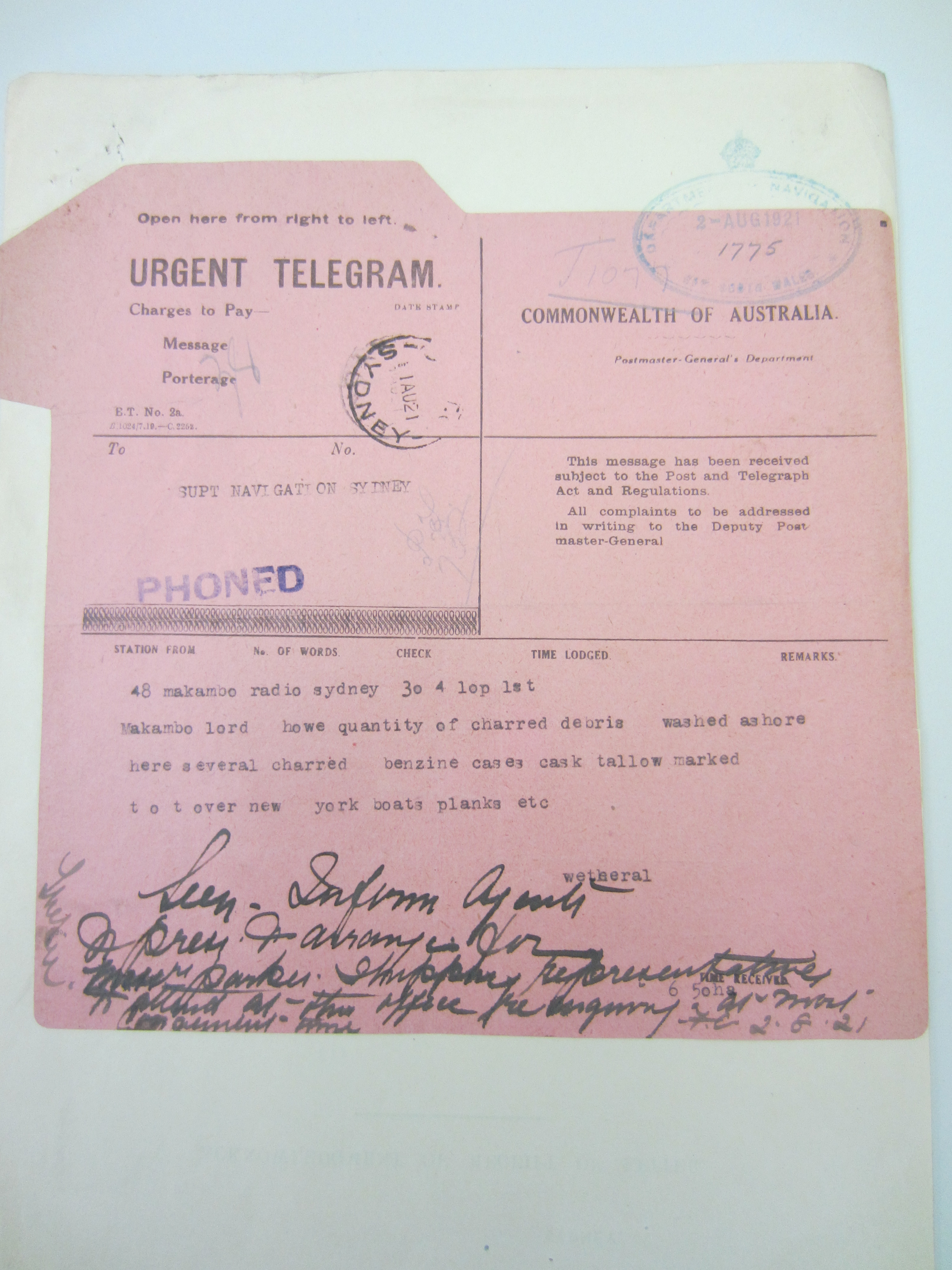
Telegram sent by radio from Makambo, with the first news of Canastota's fate, on 1 August 1921. The handwritten annotation appears to read, "Seen - Inform agents & press & arrange for Messrs Parkes, shipping representatives to attend at this office the inquiry at most convenient time. F.C. 2.8.21"

On 1 August 1921, the steamer Makambo called at Lord Howe Island and reported by radio to Sydney that flotsam and wreckage had been found there. Articles based on this report first appeared in Sydney newspapers on 2 August 1921.

All remaining doubt that the flotsam was from Canastota was removed upon arrival of Makambo in Sydney. A report appeared in The Sun (Sydney) on 9 August 1921, quoting Captain Weatherill:

"To my mind there is no doubt that the charred debris washed up at Lord Howe Island is from the missing steamer Canastota", said Captain Weatherall [sic], of the steamer Makambo, when she berthed this morning.

"Only one tallow cask had been washed ashore when we were there, and it was marked 'ToT'— the 'o' being a smaller letter than the other two. Another marking was 'Brisbane Freezing Works.'

"There was any amount of charred debris at the island and I have no doubt that it was from benzine cases. There was also, as I stated in my report to the Navigation Department, a number of planks."

In Sydney, George Parkes confirmed that the casks of tallow in Canastota's cargo were branded 'TT', stating that the small 'o' was probably a mark left by the firebrand. There was then no doubt that Canastota had been lost.

It later emerged that Captain Weatherill had seen neither the cask nor the charred debris himself, but was relaying a report from a leading citizen of the island, Mr Thompson (William Osborne Spurling Thompson (b.1868, d.1953), Chairman of the Local Advisory Committee of the Lord Howe Island Board of Control (1913-1953)).

The official report from Lord Howe Island revealed that the first flotsam had been found by an island resident, H. T. Wilson (Herbert Thomas Wilson, b. 1884 d.1972), on 14 July, just two days after the island community was first made aware that Canastota was missing during the visit of Saint Joseph. Wilson found a case of 'benzine' that had just floated ashore. The drums were intact but the case itself was sightly charred. At the same time, he also found small portions of a boat. On 27 July, he found a barrel of tallow with the distinctive markings later reported by Captain Weatherill and, finally, on the evening of 29 July, pieces of charred timber from benzine cases were found on the western beaches.

The "planks" reported by Captain Weatherill were in fact just one redwood plank found on the evening of 30 July. The size of the barnacles encrusted on the plank indicated that it had been in the sea for too long a time to be from Canastota. In all other respects, the flotsam was undoubtedly from Canastota.

Isolated Lord Howe Island was totally reliant upon passing ships for any communication and the news of Canastota's fate remained unknown to the outside world, from 14 July when the first flotsam was found until the radio report was made by Captain Weatherill on 1 August 1921.

=== Taffrail log found near Seal Rocks ===
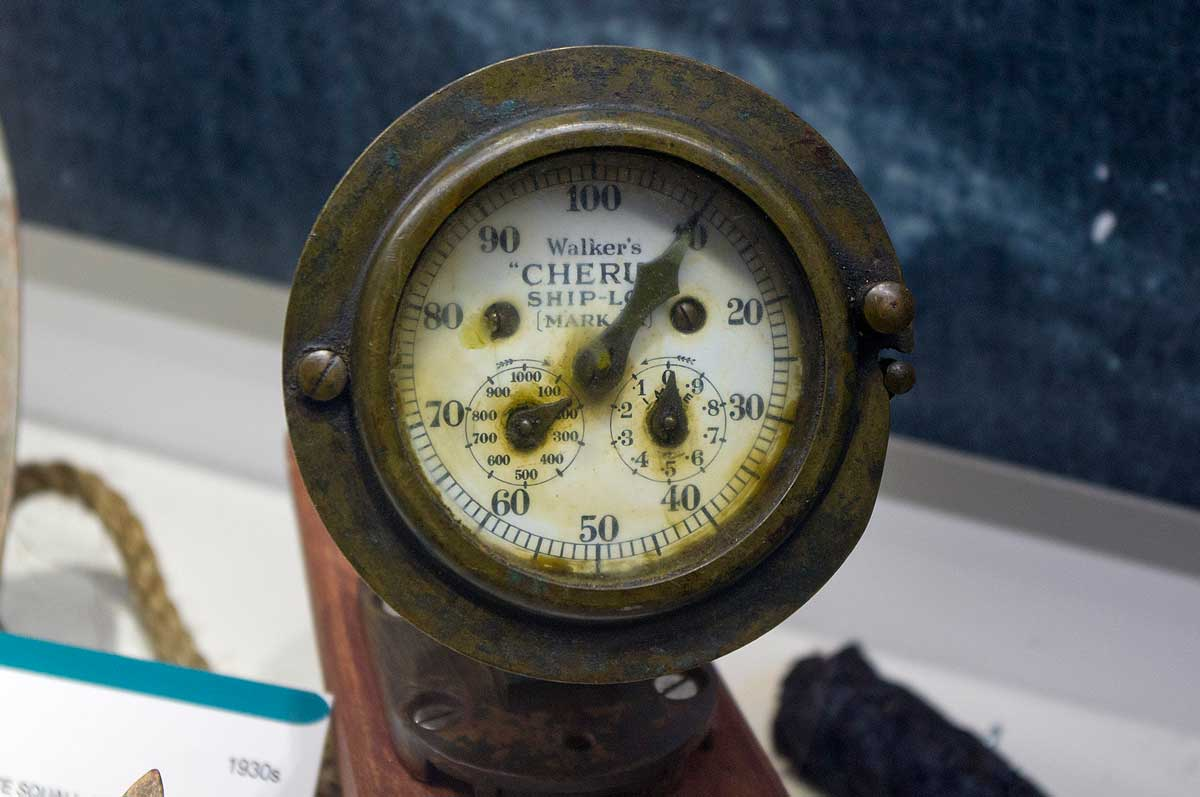
Walker's Cherub Taffrail Log - showing how its dial is attached to a plank mounted on the ship's taffrail.(Scalloway Museum)

A taffrail log is a mechanical device used to determine a ship's speed. The device obtains its name because the dial was typically attached to a plank that was secured to the taffrail of a ship. A rotor was towed behind the ship to measure the distance travelled in a similar way to an odometer.

Around the beginning of August 1921, a 'Walker's Cherub Mark II' taffrail log attached to an Oregon plank was found washed up on a beach near Seal Rocks on the Mid-North Coast of New South Wales. Two ships were wrecked on the Mid-North Coast on the night of 25 June 1921, but it was thought likely that the taffrail log was from Canastota.

Some reports state that the Oregon plank was charred but the statement by the finder (Andrew Johnson) does not mention charring. A number of freshly painted planks also washed up around the same time.

The taffrail log carried a serial number (3295 M / -) and the ship's agent, George Parkes was asked if that serial number matched the taffrail log carried by Canastota. Parkes replied that he was writing to the ship's owners to ask them. However, it seems it was never confirmed that the taffrail log or the painted planks belonged to Canastota.

== Inquiry ==
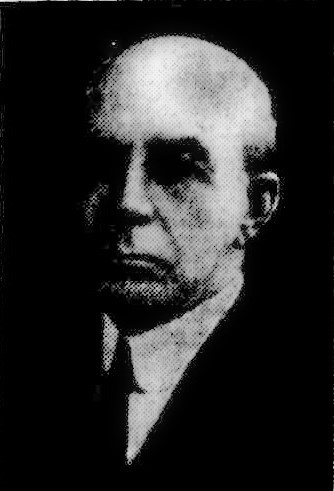
Captain Fergus Cumming, Superintendent of Navigation, around the time he retired in 1922. (Unknown photographer, Sydney Morning Herald, 16 Oct. 1922, Page 8.)

A Preliminary Inquiry into the presumed loss of Canastota was conducted by Captain Fergus Cumming, Superintendent of Navigation, commencing on 14 August 1921 and taking evidence at Sydney and Newcastle. Captain Cummings had been the Superintendent of Navigation since 1914. Originally a seafarer in the days of sailing ships, he had first joined the Department of Navigation as a pilot at the port of Newcastle in 1888.

There being no survivors and scant physical evidence of Canastota's fate, the evidence considered in the Preliminary Inquiry consisted of records of interviews—conducted by the Superintendent or a Deputy Superintendent—and written reports from shipping, oil and stevedoring company representatives, port officials, experts, and others involved in the cargo loading and re-coaling of Canastota at Australian ports, together with the crucial evidence of the official report from Lord Howe Island.

Some of the matters being considered by Cumming—notably the loading and unloading of the Canastota's cargo at Sydney and Newcastle—were ones overseen and regulated by the organisation that Cumming himself led, the Department of Navigation. This exposed Cumming to a serious conflict of interest, particularly if evidence were to be found of some deficiency in the way the Department of Navigation had carried out its role.

Cumming reported his findings on 1 September 1921.

The finding of the Preliminary Inquiry was that, "in some manner the s.s. 'Canastota' was destroyed by fire or explosion, shortly after leaving Sydney, and as all the crew are considered to have perished with the vessel, no direct evidence in regard to same can possibly be furnished."

In case of a marine incident involving a loss of life, it was the usual practice to convene a Court of Marine Inquiry. That would be held in an open court and allow interested parties—the ship's owners, surviving crew, relatives of deceased crew, and industrial organisations—to have legal representation, and the press to report the proceedings and findings. Typically, the Crown Solicitor's Office would represent the Department of Navigation.

In reporting his findings, Cumming requested an opinion from the Crown Solicitor on whether further action should be taken.

The opinion provided by the NSW Crown Solicitor, John Varnell Tillet was that, taking into account the findings of the Preliminary Inquiry, nothing was to be gained by convening a Court of Marine Inquiry. The opinion stated that, had a Court of Marine Inquiry been held, "The only practical result here in Sydney would be to have the work of the Superintendent of Navigation, an expert of high attainments and with great experience in the loading of vessels, canvassed and scrutinised by a District Court Judge, unversed in the subject, advised on technical points by two Master Mariners, the latter having no power to adjudicate."

In his opinion, Tillet also raised the matter of cost; "I have hardly remind the Department of the huge sum spent on a recent maritime investigation here, with no discoveries of practical value notwithstanding the very able report by the Royal Commissioner." This is a reference to the Royal Commission of 1919-1920—its report included implicit criticism of coal port and shipping operations that were overseen and regulated by the Department of Navigation. The Crown Solicitor's opinion does not mention Cumming's potential conflict of interest as the head of the Department of Navigation.

Tillet's written opinion, together with a copy of the report of the Preliminary Inquiry, was forwarded to the Board of Trade in London—Canastota was a British-flagged vessel—which agreed with the opinion that no Court of Marine Inquiry would be convened. There would be no further investigation into the circumstances of Canastota's loss.

Captain Cumming retired in 1922, just over a year after reporting his findings into the loss of Canastota.

== Controversy ==
=== Naval involvement in the search ===
The New Zealand-based cruiser HMS Chatham had been involved in the search for Canastota but returned to Wellington on 30 June 1921, without seeing any sign of it. Following the return of Chatham, unnamed—presumably naval—sources were reported as holding the view that even if Canastota had launched its lifeboats, those boats would not have survived the seas encountered during the search.

The seas had been benign during the time that Canastota should have completed her crossing of the Tasman Sea (13 to 18 June) but the weather conditions in the Tasman Sea had worsened after that time. In the early morning of Sunday 26 June 1921, violent storms claimed two coastal steamers—Our Jack and Fitzroy—on the New South Wales mid-north coast.

The bad weather raised fears for the men; a relative of one of the engineers of Canastota was quoted, in The Daily Telegraph (Sydney) of 25 June 1921, as saying, "I think it is up to the Admiralty to despatch at least two of the cruisers to make a search, as every day will make the position worse, and it will be a terrible ordeal for men in open boats in weather like we are experiencing."

Chatham had a limited cruising range and one of the concerns raised was that Canastota may be in trouble closer to the coast of Australia than New Zealand.

There was an expectation that the Australian Navy would send a destroyer in search of the missing ship but, controversially, the Navy refused to do so. That decision led to some unfavourable press reports and representations from citizens arguing that a ship should be sent.

The Australian Navy did not relent and no Australian naval ship was sent out in search of Canastota.

=== Canastota's 'case oil' cargo ===
In the early years of the twentieth century 'benzine' was a commonly used name for petrol or gasoline. It was also known at that time as 'motor spirit'. Whether the name 'petrol', 'benzine' or 'motor spirit' was used was a matter of branding.

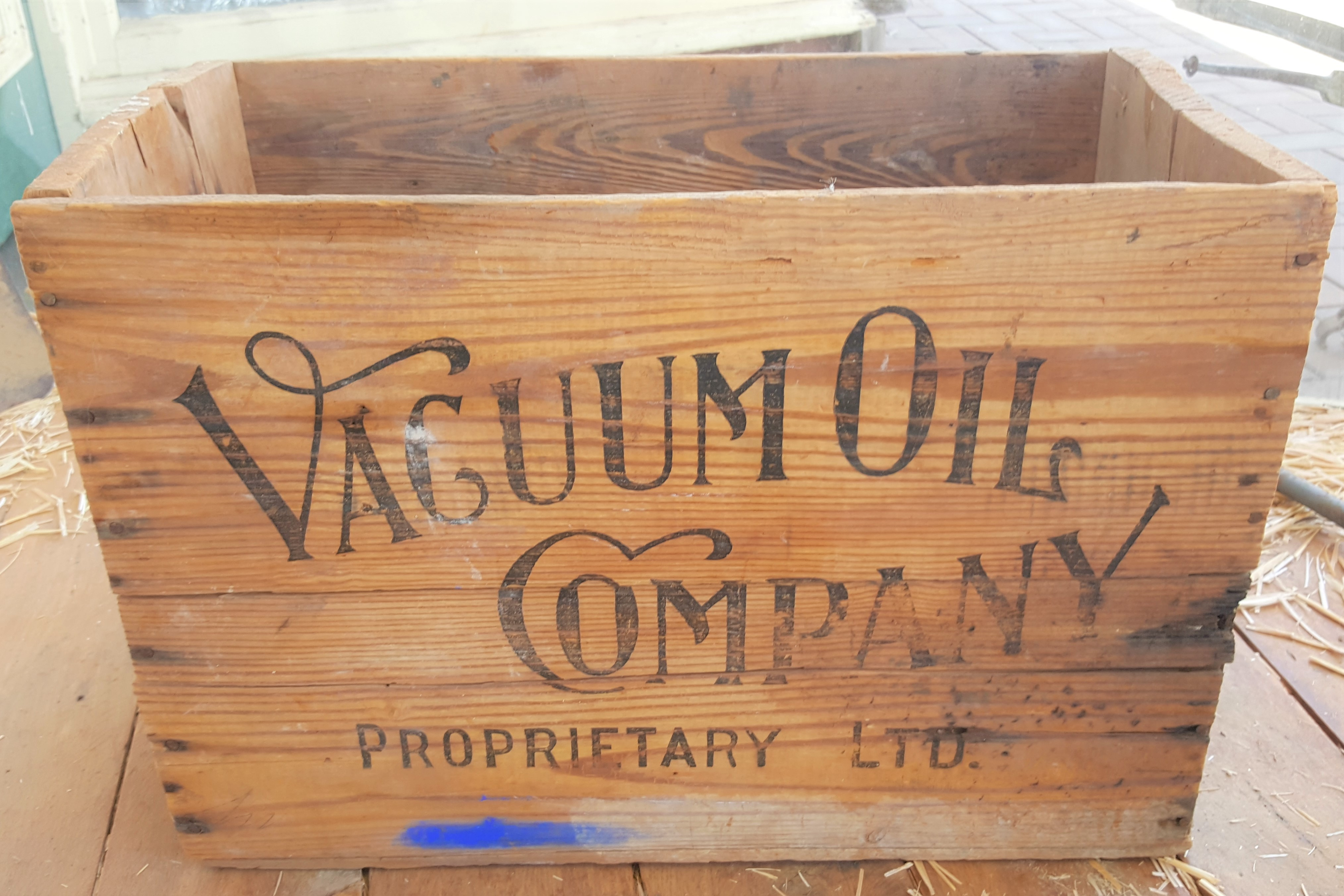
Vacuum Oil case — wooden case that originally held two drums of liquid petroleum product.

Canastota's cargo included 50,950 cases (407,600 imperial gallons / 1,852,986 litres) of 'benzine' and 'motor spirit' when she left Sydney. Unusually, the 'benzine' cargo was loaded at Australian ports and destined for the United States. It had been imported previously but had been found to be defective due to its high sulphur content and was being re-exported to be reprocessed. The sulphur caused discolouring of a car's metalwork but, otherwise, the 'benzine' was neither more or less inherently hazardous than any other.

By 1921, with the rapid rise in numbers of petrol-powered motor cars, there was significant demand for this fuel in Australian and New Zealand. Except for the operation of John Fell and Company, refining shale oil at Newnes until 1922, there was no refinery producing 'benzine' or 'motor spirit' in Australia, at the time. Such fuel was, of necessity, mainly imported by sea.

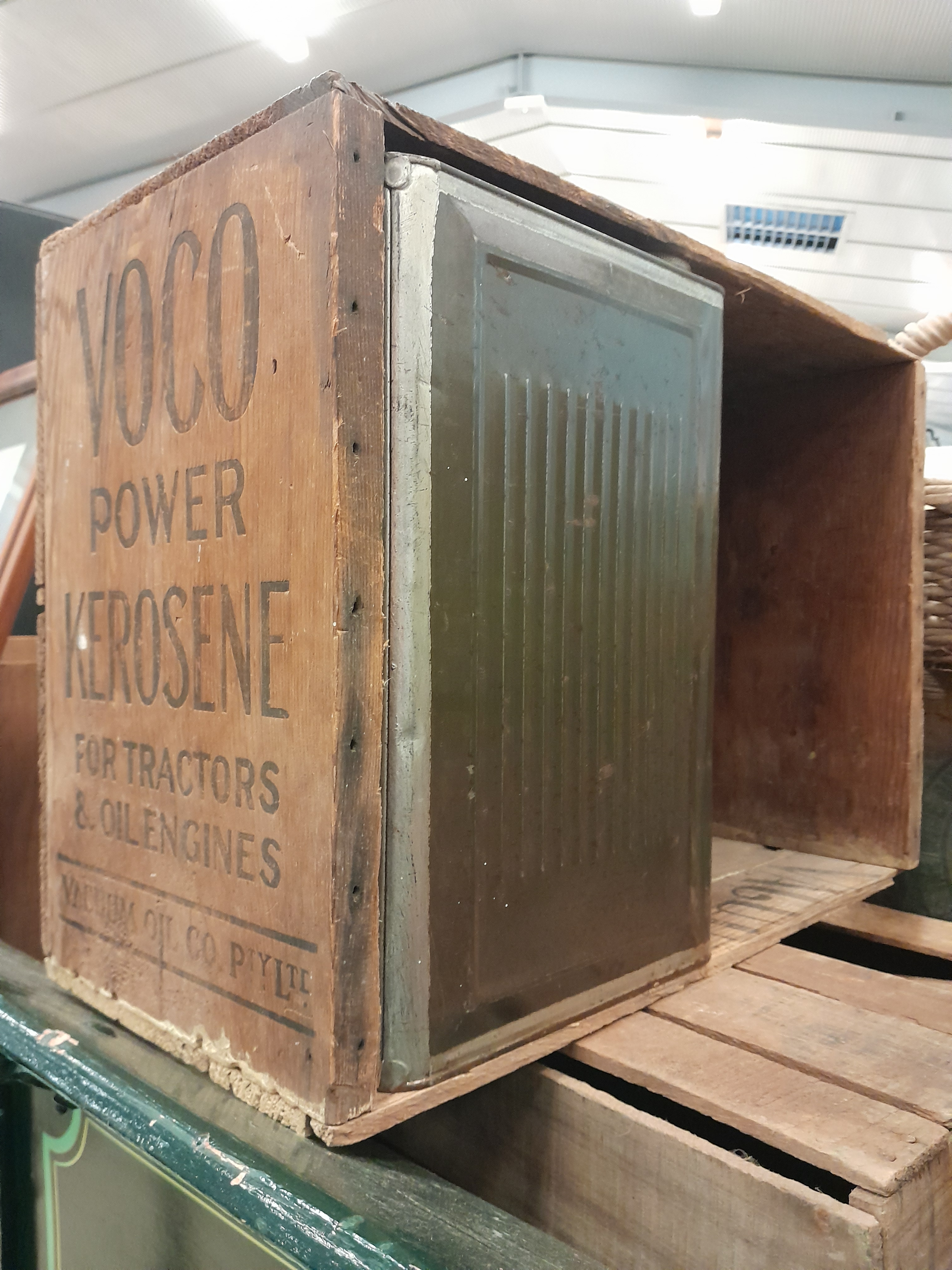
Drum used for power kerosene inside its wooden case (Redlands Coast Museum, Cleveland, Queensland). The troublesome soldered seams are clearly visible in this photograph.

The petroleum industry at first followed the same practices for the new highly volatile petroleum product 'benzine' as it had long done for less volatile kerosene. The flammable liquid was stored in thin-walled tinned-steel drums—of a rectangular prism shape with a square base—and the drums packed inside wooden cases. Each case contained two drums of five U.S. gallons or four Imperial gallons each. Such a cargo was referred to 'case oil'.

Vapour from leaking drums in cargoes of 'case oil' was the cause of many ship fires during the first quarter of the twentieth century. Once an explosive concentration of vapour existed, any source of ignition could result in an explosion. Coal-fired steamers carrying 'case oil' were particularly at risk. Very rarely, there might be an explosion but no fire or a small fire that could be extinguished; more typically, an explosion would initiate a catastrophic fire.

There had been previous disasters such as the fire and loss of Haversham Grange in October 1906 and the explosion and fire on the SS Carroo (later HMAS Carroo) in March 1920, as two examples of many similar incidents.

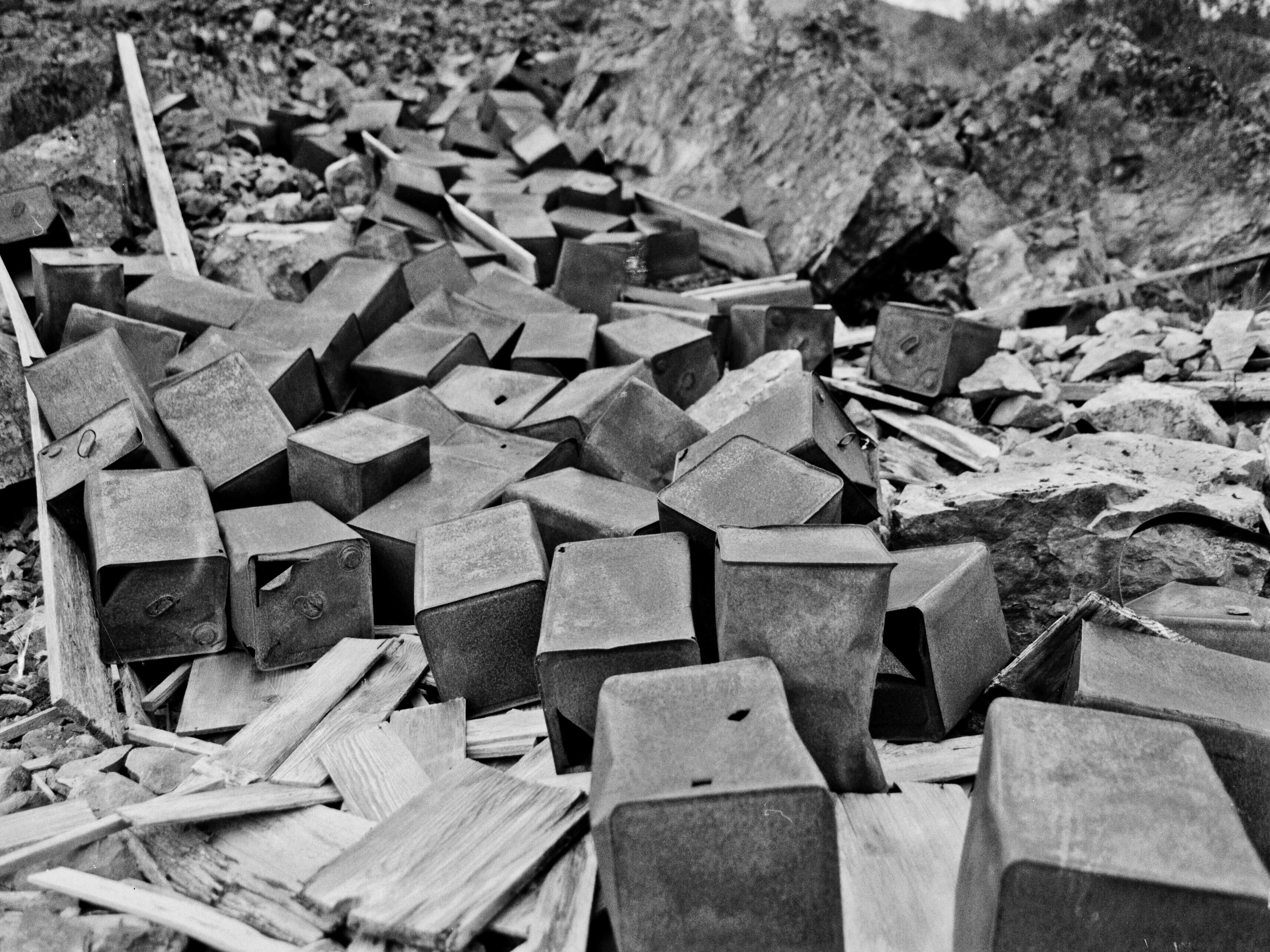
Discarded and rusting tinplate fuel drums in Yukon, Canada. The shorter pieces of wood are probably the remains of the cases in which the drums were shipped.

In written evidence to the Preliminary Inquiry into the loss of the Canastota, the Acting Superintendent of the Explosives Department, R.O. Crockett, drew attention to the hazards of shipping 'case oil'. His evidence stated that the typical leakage on a voyage from New York to Australia was around 1%, and that if drums were rehandled—Canastota's 'case oil' cargo had been rehandled, more than once—another 1% at least of leakage could be expected. His view was, "the increased hazard is a peculiar feature of handling motor spirit in this class of container, as it has been found in practice that with each additional handling the seams of the tins become more fragile and a greater percentage of leaks is discovered in proportion to the care with which the shipment is handled."

Crockett went on to express an opinion that, without mechanical forced ventilation, it was impossible to keep a ship's hold containing 'case oil' free of inflammable liquid or explosive vapours. Canastota did not have forced ventilation of its holds, however, her Captain had been concerned enough that, on the leg between Brisbane and Newcastle, he had a windsail rigged to direct fresh air into the holds containing the 'case oil' cargo and left some cargo hatches open. Crockett also stated that the openings of the ventilators of such a hold should be covered in fine metal gauze, thereby creating a flameproof barrier and acting as a flame arrester. The precaution of fitting such metal gauze over ventilator openings was mandated in rules of the Board of Trade, for all British-flagged ships carrying a petroleum cargo, but nothing indicates that Canastota—sometimes misidentified as an American vessel—had them. George Parkes, the shipping agent, in evidence to the Preliminary Inquiry, stated that a rubber barrier had been installed on the bulkhead between the hold and the stokehold, while Canastota had been berthed in Sydney, to prevent vapour entering the stokehold. Ignition of vapour inside the stokehold was the source of a spectacular fire on Defender inside Wellington Harbour in August 1918.

The evidence to the Preliminary Inquiry reveals two seemingly contradictory approaches to addressing the risk associated with shipping 'case oil'; either hermetically sealing the space to prevent vapour at explosive concentration reaching any potential source of ignition or ventilating the space sufficiently to prevent any vapour reaching an explosive concentration. Neither approach was entirely achievable on a cargo steamer of that time—such as Canastota—but both had an implicit assumption that vapour—from a leaking 'case oil' cargo—would be present in the cargo holds.

The remainder of Canastota's cargo loaded at Australian ports comprised casks of tallow, hides and some general cargo. When Canastota left Sydney, the ship's holds were not full. It was planned to load another 50,000 cases of defective 'benzine' at Wellington; that consignment is known to have included leaking drums, and had required such careful handing during unloading at an oil store that the consequent delays had caused interruption to road traffic, and leaking drums on the road lorries had created a traffic hazard. Later, a consignment of copra—a material subject to spontaneous combustion—was to be loaded at Suva.

=== 'Floating bomb' ===
On 20 August 1921 a sensational article appeared on the front page of the Smith's Weekly with the headline 'Canastota, A Floating Bomb'.

It began, "If ever a proper inquiry be set on foot as to the cause of the disappearance of the steamer 'Canastota,' which sailed from Port Jackson for America, via New Zealand on 13 June 1921, several startling facts will come to light. The evidence will show that, on at least two occasions, the intensely dangerous condition of the interior of the vessel was brought under notice, and that in spite of these serious warnings, the 'Canastota' was allowed to proceed to sea."

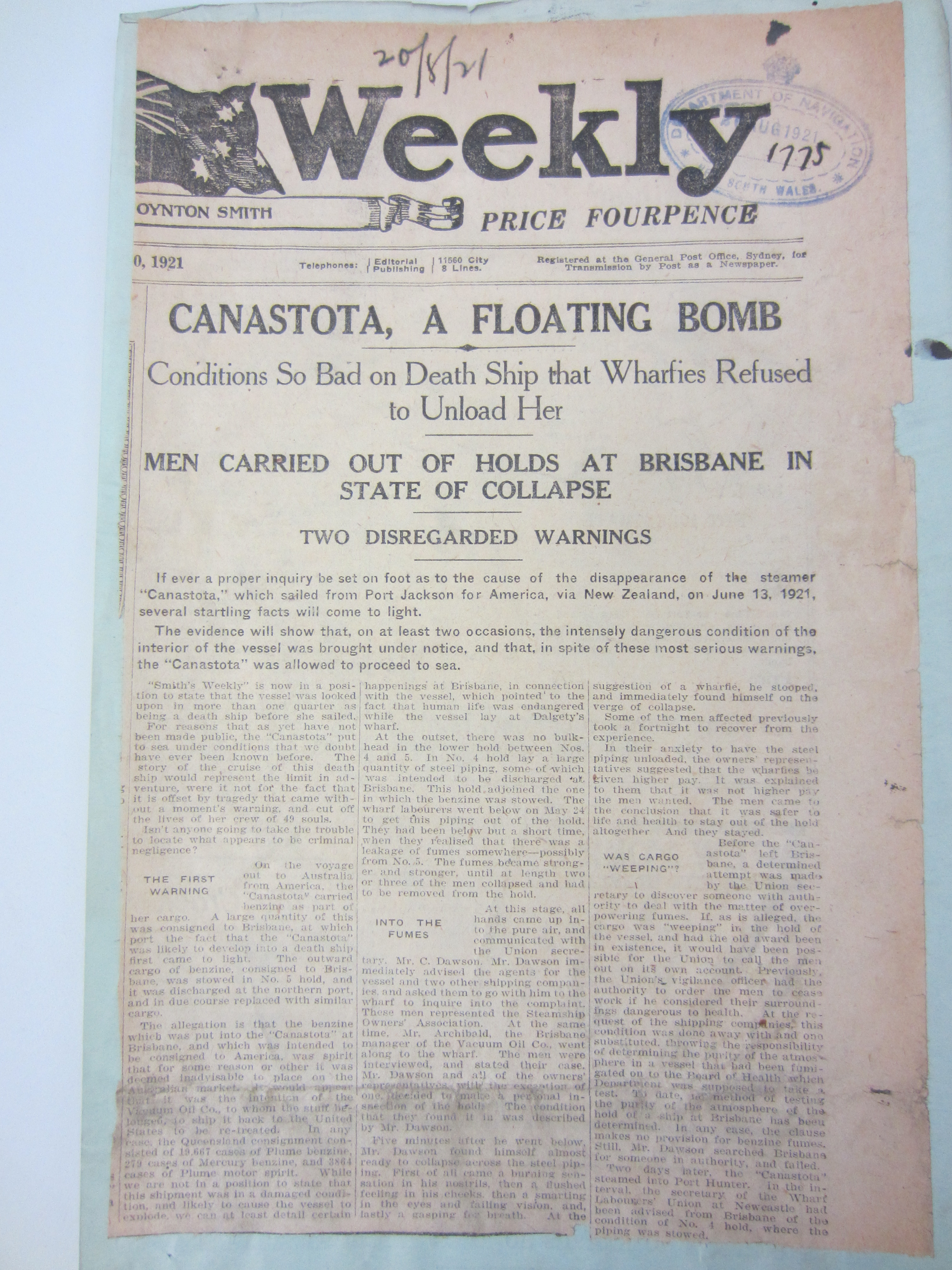
Original copy of 'Floating Bomb' newspaper article (Front page of Smith's Weekly, 20 August 1921) from the papers of the Preliminary Inquiry held in the NSW State Records Office.

The Smith's Weekly article went on to report that in the port of Brisbane, where the most 'benzine' was loaded, two or three wharf labourers had collapsed while attempting to unload a quantity of steel pipes from the hold adjacent to—but not separated from—the hold containing the 'benzine'. The article stated that some men were overcome by fumes from the 'benzine' and all labourers then left the hold. They then contacted the secretary of their union, a Mr Dawson, who in turn contacted the ship's agents and two others as representatives of the Shipowner's Association. These men then joined Mr Dawson at the wharf. The article stated that the wharf was also attended by Mr Archibald, the Brisbane manager of the Vacuum Oil Co. All these men, except one, then inspected the hold and according to the article, "The condition in which they found it was as described by Mr. Dawson." According to the article, the wharf labourers were offered higher pay to unload the pipes but refused. The ship left Brisbane with the pipes on board.

The next port of call of Canastota was Newcastle. While there, another 5,372 cases of defective 'benzine' and 'motor spirit' were to be loaded. According to the article, some of these cases were damaged and some leaking. The article also stated that at Newcastle another attempt to unload the pipes was also unsuccessful because the wharf labourers refused to do the work, as the fumes had "lodged in the piping". The ship left Newcastle for Sydney with the pipes still on board.

The 'Floating bomb' article does not describe what happened at Sydney but the steel pipes finally were unloaded there. While at Sydney, some of the 'benzine' on board was shifted to another hold—this was to make room for the cargo to be loaded at Suva—and another 8,962 cases of 'benzine' and 'motor spirit' were loaded.

Although the 'Floating Bomb' article made serious allegations and identified several potential witnesses, the individuals concerned were not interviewed for the Preliminary Inquiry, the findings of which were reported at the beginning of September 1921.

=== No permit to load petroleum ===
On 24 September 1921, the Smith's Weekly published an allegation that the petroleum cargo had been loaded at Brisbane in contravention of a regulation under the Navigation Act that required a permit to load such a cargo.

"Mr. C. Dawson, Secretary of the Brisbane Branch of the Waterside Workers' Federation has written to several members [of the Queensland state parliament], saying: — I am authoritatively informed that no permit was applied for or granted by the Harbour authorities for the shipment. Had a permit been applied for an inspector would have been sent to inspect the condition, of the cases, and I feel sure that the strength of the fumes would have convinced him immediately that the cases were leaky and therefore unsafe to ship."

On 22 September 1921, this allegation was raised in the Queensland Legislative Assembly as a question to the Treasurer, John Fihelly, by Mick Kirwan, M.L.A (Labor, Brisbane). In reply, Fihelly confirmed that there had been no application for a permit nor an inspection of the cargo and stated that he had approved a recommendation of the Marine Board of Queensland to initiate legal proceedings.

Similar permits were required, for loading petroleum at the two New South Wales ports, Newcastle and Sydney; there seems to be no record of such permits being issued to load Canastota, and the Preliminary Inquiry does not seem to have addressed their apparent absence.

== Aftermath ==
The only party punished as a result of events during Canastota's last voyage was Dalgety & Company, the shipping agent for Canastota in Brisbane. On 18 November 1921, it was fined for loading a petroleum cargo "without a special permit from a shipping inspector or other person authorised by the Marine Board". The company submitted evidence that this was by oversight rather than intentional. The fine was £2, with £3 15s 6d in costs.

In August 1921, another steamer of the U.S. & A Line, West Wind, loaded a cargo of 30,000 cases of 'benzine' in Melbourne, and would go on to load another 30,000 in Sydney; all part of the same batch of defective 'benzine' as carried on Canastota.

The United States & Australia Line was renamed the 'Atlantic-Australasian Line' in November 1924 but seems to have been better known as the 'Atlantic-Australia Line' around the time that its operations were taken over by the Roosevelt Steamship Co. in 1926. The name seems to disappear altogether after 1929, well before the merger of the Roosevelt Steamship Co with International Mercantile Marine Co. in 1931.

Canastota's disappearance and the controversy surrounding it were soon forgotten but the disaster was to be one of the last of its kind.

At the time of the loss of Canastota, the shipment by sea of volatile flammable liquids as 'case oil' in ships designed for general cargo was already viewed as a dangerous anachronism. Its only advantage was that 'case oil' could be transported in ordinary ships and handled at ports that did not have specialised bulk petroleum facilities.

The technology had long existed to ship inflammable petroleum liquids safely, as a bulk cargo. Shell had a bulk oil discharge, storage and distribution facility at Gore Bay in Sydney Harbour from 1901. In 1908, the oil tanker Salahadji had safely carried a bulk cargo of 'benzine' to Sydney, and discharged it at Gore Bay. The following year Trocas carried a record cargo of half a million gallons of Shell 'motor spirit'.

In 1924 Vacuum Oil opened its bulk petroleum products terminal at Pulpit Point, a small peninsula at Hunter's Hill on Sydney Harbour. In October of that year, the company-owned oil tanker H.T Harper—built in 1921—arrived at this new facility with a 1.8 million gallon bulk cargo of 'gasoline'. About the H.T. Harper, it was noted that, "Every precaution is taken to prevent fire."

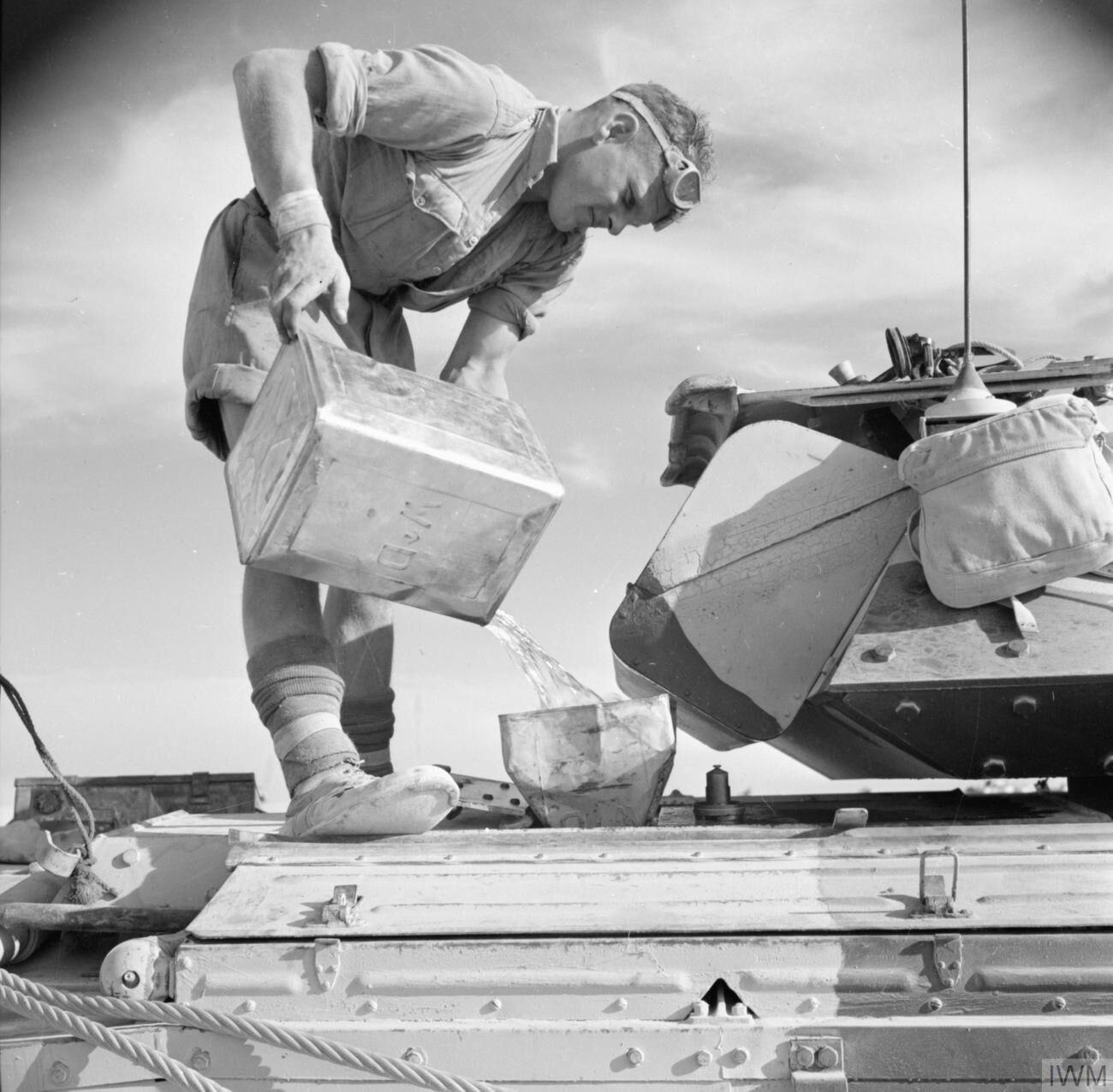
Refueling a tank from a four-gallon 'flimsy' in North Africa 1942.

The amount of 'case oil' shipped to Australia declined after 1924 and from that year some petroleum was refined locally. Thereafter, 'case oil' shipped by sea was more commonly kerosene, or other low volatility petroleum, rather than more volatile and dangerous 'benzine'. In 1939, there were still new purpose-built case-oil carriers, with aft-mounted diesel engines, entering the trade.

The 'case oil' approach to shipping 'gasoline' revived during the Second World War. The thin-walled tinplate four (Imperial) gallon drum became known by British troops—with good reason—as a 'flimsy'. It caused many problems, accidents, and wastage of valuable fuel, until the British started reusing and later copied their German enemy's excellently-designed and robust jerrycan. These 'flimsies' were very similar to the drums that had been carried in wooden cases on Canastota. The experience of the British soldiers in North Africa—leakage at the seams and a lack of robustness of 'flimsies' when handled—was similar too to the evidence given by R.O.Crockett at the Preliminary Inquiry of 1921. The thin-walled tinplate drum had been the culprit from the outset, making 'case oil' dangerous and unreliable.

The 'case oil' trade virtually ceased, in Australia at least, soon after the war's end.

Canastota's Sydney agent, George Arthur Parkes, who had done so much to initiate and organise the search of 1921, served as Deputy Lord Mayor of Sydney in 1936 and died in 1943 as a well-respected citizen. Captain Fergus Cumming, who had conducted the Preliminary Inquiry, retired in 1922 and died in 1932.

The wreck of Canastota has never been found and she remains 'missing', over a century after her disappearance.

There is no memorial to the ship or its 49 crew. The eleven officers' names and something of their backgrounds appeared in newspaper articles of the time but the names of the 37 Chinese and one Peruvian seamen were recorded only in the papers of the Preliminary Inquiry of 1921, which are held in the NSW State Archives Collection. There are also records relating to Canastota, in the National Archive of the United Kingdom and in the Queensland State Archives.
