= Interior communications electrician =

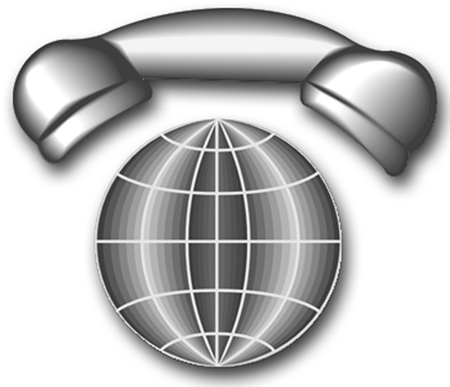
- Rating insignia
- Issued by: United States Navy
- Type: Enlisted rating
- Abbreviation: IC
- Specialty: Combat Systems

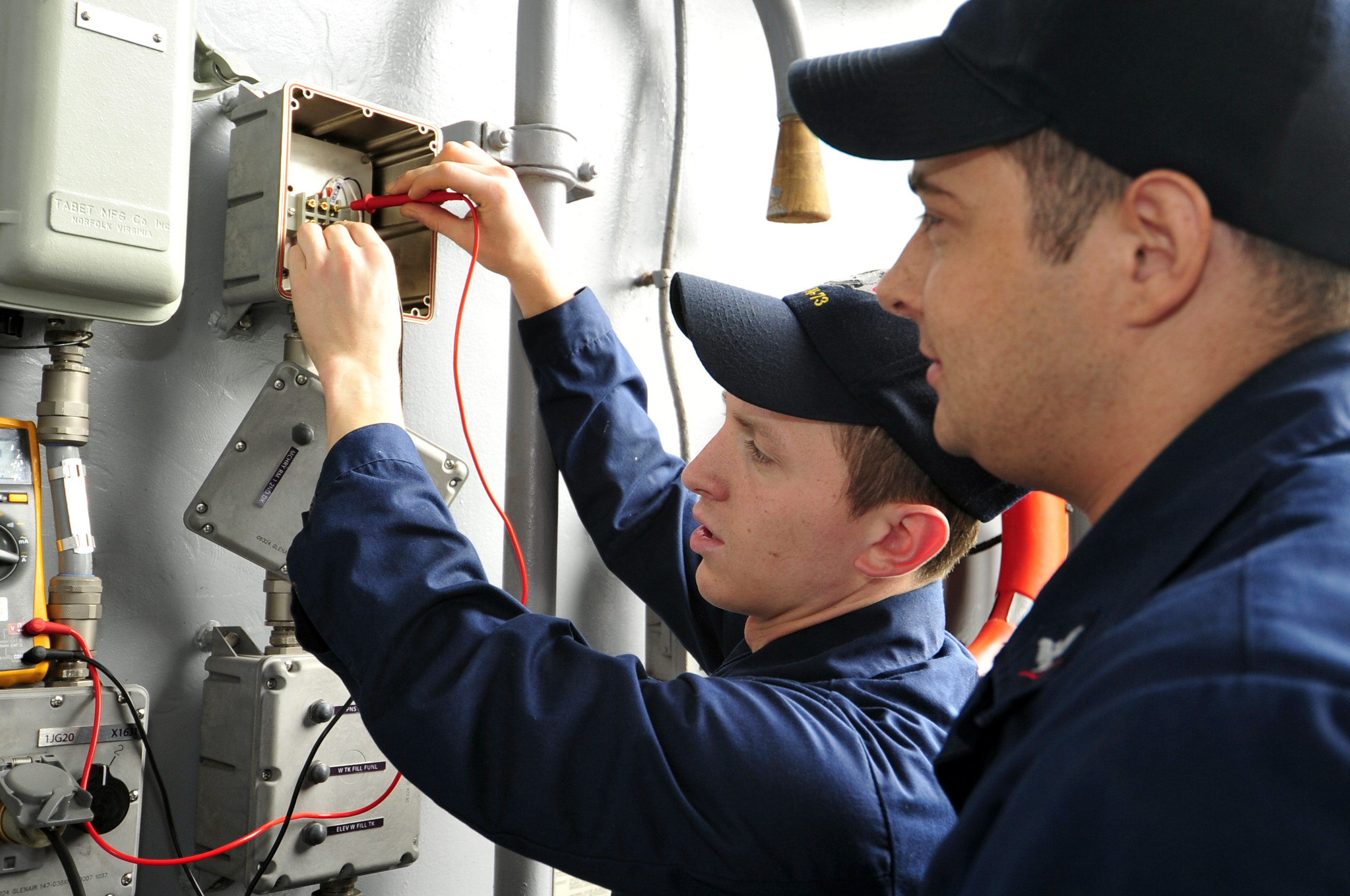
Interior Communications Electrician Fireman Michael Colonna, left, from Sterling Heights, Mich., and Interior Communications Electrician 3rd Class Anthony King, from Nacogdoches, Texas, checks for voltage on an aircraft carrier elevator bell buzzer circuit during a dock trial aboard the aircraft carrier USS George Washington (CVN 73).

Interior communications electrician (IC) is a rating in the United States Navy. They operate and perform organizational and intermediate maintenance on alarm, warning, and indicator systems; interior communications; and ship's control, entertainment, and navigation systems. IC is one of the most versatile ratings in the U.S. Navy with equipment all the way forward, all the way aft, all the way up the mast and on the bottom of the ship. Members of this rating are commonly referred to as "IC-men" by Navy personnel.

== Duties ==
Interior communications electricians install, maintain and repair the equipment needed for interior communications within ships and shore facilities. These communication systems include public address systems, interior telephone systems, alarm systems, engine telegraphs to communicate orders for changes in engine speed from the bridge (ship's command station) to the engine room, certain kinds of ship control and equipment monitoring devices, the ship's gyrocompass, the rudder position indicator, audio-visual equipment for the ship's TV entertainment systems, advanced navigation and various other equipment.

The duties performed by ICs include:

- Maintaining and repairing interior communications systems;
- Preparing and interpreting blueprints, wiring diagrams and sketches;
- Installing and inspecting dry cell and storage batteries;
- Recharging wet cell batteries;
- Testing interior communications and gyrocompass equipment;
- Installing telephone and other communications circuits, boxes, switchboards and bell buzzer systems;
- Maintaining propulsion ordering and indicating systems;
- Maintaining tactical plotters and dead reckoning equipment;
- Maintaining and operating broadcast TV and radio systems and SITE (Shipboard Information, Training and Entertainment) CCTV systems;
- Maintaining and repairing shipboard navigation equipment;
- Maintaining impressed current cathodic protection (ICCP) system;
- Maintaining ship's degaussing system.
- Maintaining sound powered phone system;
- Maintaining water salinity levels indicator;
- Maintaining ship's anemometer system;
- Maintaining ship's electromagnetic log system;
- Maintaining ship's optical landing aid system on CVN platforms
- Maintaining flight deck surveillance camera system on CVN platforms
- Maintaining warhead/weapons storage alarm systems
- Maintain ships DMS/FODMS/GEDMS data distribution system

== Working environment ==
People in the IC rating work in many different situations, at sea and ashore. While most of their work is performed indoors, it may be in a clean or dirty environment or a shop-like nature, and it may be in any kind of climate or temperature. ICs usually work closely with others. Most systems ICs work on is of the modern solid state electronic type, making the rating a very technical profession. All ICs require a secret security clearance.

== See also ==
- List of United States Navy ratings
