= Pitometer log =

Device measuring a ship's speed

Figure 1: Photo of World War II US Navy submarine pitometer. This unit uses a mercury-based manometer to measure the difference in static and dynamic water pressure.

Pitometer logs (also known as pit logs) are devices used to measure a ship's speed relative to the water. They are used on both surface ships and submarines. Data from the pitometer log is usually fed directly into the ship's navigation system.

== History ==
All nautical instruments designed to measure the speed of a ship through water are known as logs. This nomenclature dates back to days of sail when sailors tossed a log attached to rope knotted at regular intervals off the stern of a ship. The sailors would count the number of knots that passed through their hands in a given period of time. Today sailors still use the unit of knots to express a ship's speed. The speed of the ship was needed to navigate the ship using dead reckoning, which was standard practice in the days before modern navigation instruments like GPS.

During World War II, pitometer logs were often interfaced directly into warship fire-control systems. This interface was necessary to allow gunnery and torpedo fire-control systems to automatically track targets.

The pitometer log was patented in 1899 by Edward Smith Cole.

== Technology ==
=== Principles of operation ===
Figure 2: Illustration of a Mercury Manometer-Based Pitometer Log.

The basic technology of the pitometer log is similar to that of the pitot tube on an aircraft. Typically, the pitometer has a long tube that penetrates the ship's hull near the keel. The part of the pitometer protruding from the ship is sometimes called a pit sword or rodmeter. This tube usually has two openings: one facing the direction of seawater motion that is used to measure the total pressure of the seawater and one at 90° to the direction of seawater motion that is used to measure the static seawater pressure. The dynamic pressure of the seawater is a function of the depth of the water and the speed of the vessel, and is obtained by subtracting static from dynamic pressure.

In early realizations of the pitometer log, mercury manometers were used to measure the pressure differences (see Figure 1). Later realizations used approaches that would generate equalizing pressures within the pitometer that would balance out the dynamic pressure. This eliminated the need for mercury manometers.

=== Analysis ===
An expression can be derived for the velocity of water impacting the ship as a function of the difference in dynamic and static water pressure using Bernoulli's principle. The total pressure of the water in the tube with moving seawater can be described by Equation 1.

(Equation 1)	$p_{Total}= p_{Static} + p_{Dynamic} \,\!$

where
- p_{Total} is the total fluid pressure.
- p_{Static} is the static pressure, which strictly depends on depth.
- p_{Dynamic} is the fluid pressure caused by fluid motion.

Since water is an incompressible fluid, the dynamic pressure component of the total pressure can be expressed in terms of the water density and the water velocity as is shown in Equation 2.

(Equation 2)	$p_{Total}= p_{Static} + \rho \cdot \frac{v_{Water}^2}{2} \,\!$

where
- v_{Water} is the speed of the fluid flow.
- ρ is the fluid density.

Equation 2 can be solved for the velocity of water in terms of the difference in pressure between the two legs of the manometer. Equation 3 shows that velocity is a function of the square root of the pressure difference.

(Equation 3)	$v_{Water} = \sqrt{\frac{2 \cdot \left(p_{Total}-p_{Static}\right)}{\rho}} \,\!$

Because the speed computed by the pitometer is a function of the difference between pressure readings, the pitometer does not produce an accurate result when the ship's velocity is low and the two pressure readings are nearly the same.

== Alternatives to the pitometer ==
While the pitometer log is very commonly used today, there are a number of other logs that are also in use. These logs include:

- Impeller log:A variation of this approach is known as a patent log, which is towed from the stern of a ship. The patent log includes a mechanical register that counts the log's rotations as it is being towed. The patent log was invented in 1688 by the English instrument maker Humphry Cole. The patent log is also known as a screw log or taffrail log.

- Propeller RPM: The speed of a ship is roughly proportional to the rotation rate of the propeller. This approach is most useful when the propeller has constant pitch. It is less useful on ships with propellers that have variable-pitch propellers or no propellers (like sailing ships). A variation of this approach was used by submarines during World War II to determine the speed of targets. The sonar operator would listen to the sound of a target's propeller and would determine its rotation rate or “blade count”. Knowing the propeller rotation rate and visually identifying the type of ship, the target's speed could be estimated.

- Electromagnetic log

- GPS measurements yield only a position, and neither speed nor direction of movement. However, most GPS receivers can automatically derive velocity and direction from two or more position measurements. The disadvantage of this principle is that changes in speed or direction can only be computed with a delay, and that derived direction becomes inaccurate when the distance travelled between two position measurements drops below or near the random error of position measurement. To counter this effect, more advanced navigation systems use additional sensors like a compass or an inertial navigation system to complement GPS.

- Doppler Velocity Log (DVL): Some ships are equipped with sonar instruments that can measure the Doppler shift in a sound pulse generated by the ship's motion as it reflects off the ocean bottom or off particles in the water. The speed measurements from a Doppler instrument can therefore be relative to the ground, or to the water.

- Correlation Velocity Log (CVL): A CVL consists of a sound transmitter and a number of receivers. These very expensive devices measure the ship's ground speed by performing correlation processing between the signals received by the different receivers at different times. This correlation can be related to the distance moved by the ship. CVL's are used primarily by ships that need very precise measurement of low speeds, which a pitometer has difficulty measuring accurately.
