= Traverse board =

Navigational tool

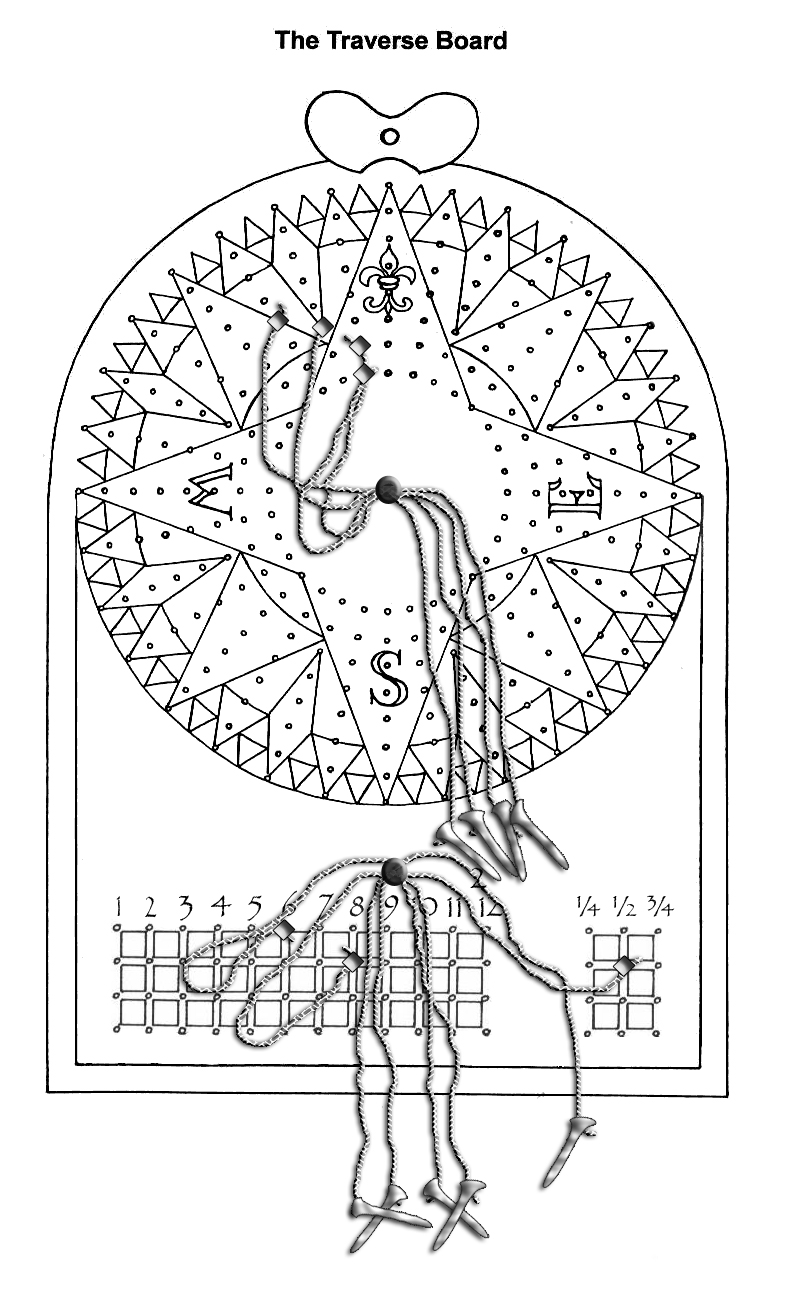
Traverse board

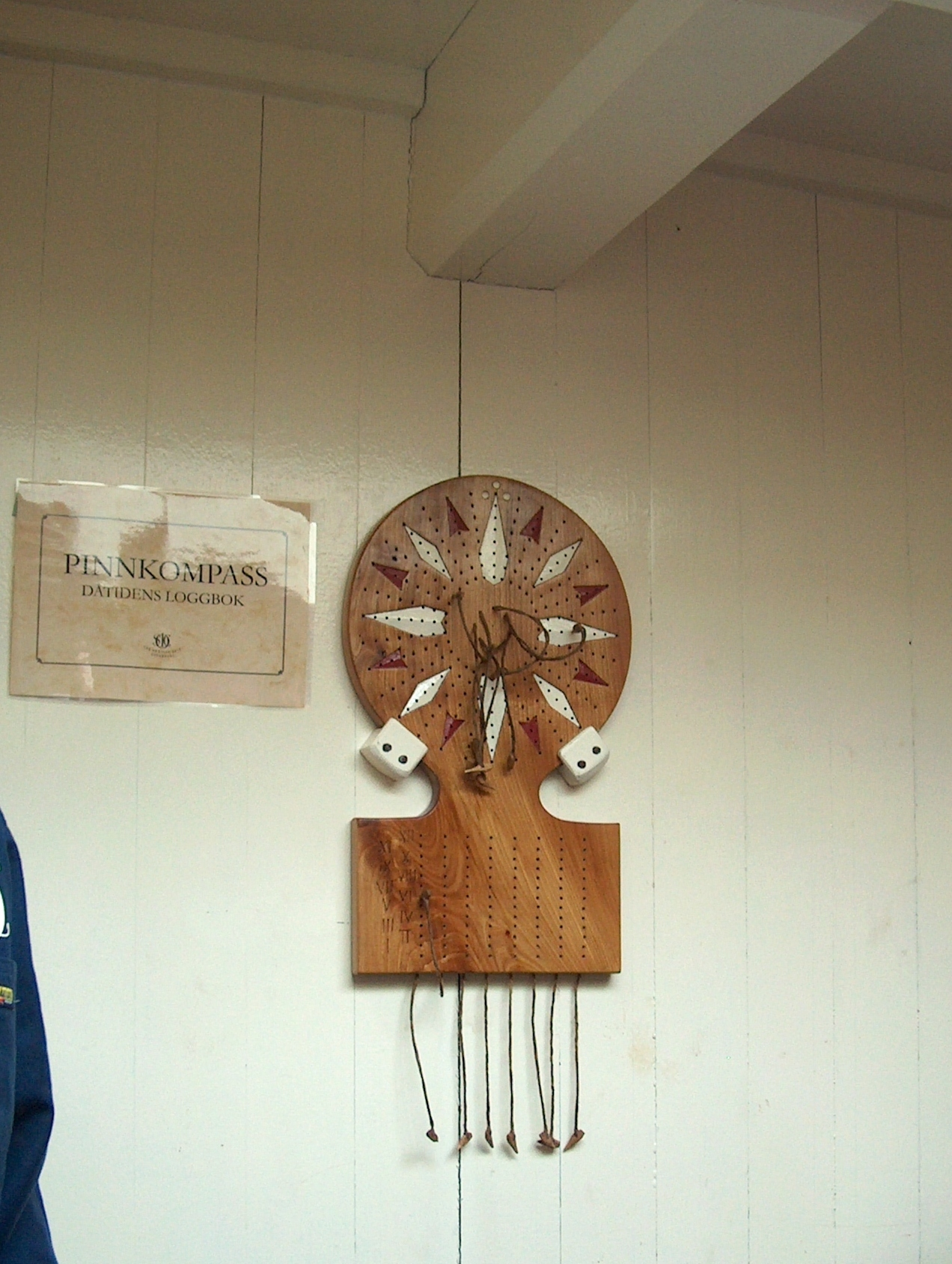
Traverse board of the replica sailing ship Götheborg.

The traverse board is a tool formerly used in dead reckoning navigation to easily record the speeds and directions sailed during a watch. Even crew members who could not read or write could use the traverse board.

As the mathematician William Bourne remarked in 1571, “I have known within these 20 years that them that were ancient masters of shippes hathe derided and mocked them that have occupied their cards and plattes and also the observation of the Altitude of the Pole saying; that they care not for their sheepskinne for he could keepe a better account upon a board.”

Bourne’s ‘old salt’ is talking about a traverse board, a wooden board with a compass rose drawn on it linked by pegs and cords to a series of peg holes beneath it. It allowed a helmsman to keep a rough check of the time sailed on each rhumb of the wind.

== Description ==
The traverse board is a wooden board with peg-holes and attached pegs. It is divided into two parts, upper and lower.

The top part is for recording direction sailed. It has a representation of the compass rose with its 32 compass points, just as on the face of the ship's compass. Eight concentric rings are inscribed on the compass rose. Each ring has one peg hole at each point of the compass. Eight pegs are attached to the centre of the compass rose with strings.

The bottom part is for recording speed. It has four rows of holes. Each column represents a certain speed, measured in knots. Three more columns to the right give fractional knots: 1/4, 1/2, and 3/4. Eight pegs are attached to this part of the board.

Each half-hour during the watch, a crew member inserted a peg in the top part of the board to represent the heading sailed during that half-hour, as shown on the ship's compass. The innermost ring of peg-holes is used for the first half-hour, and each succeeding measurement was made in the next ring out, until all eight rings were used.

Each hour during the watch, a crew member inserted a peg in the bottom portion of the board to represent the speed sailed during the hour. The speed would have been measured using a knot log. If the speed for the first hour of the watch was 10 1/2 knots, the crew member would count over 10 holes in the first row and place one peg, then place another peg in the column marked "1/2". In the second hour of the watch, the crew member would use the second row of pegs, and so on until all 4 rows were used.

At the end of the watch, the navigator collected the information about the speeds and directions sailed during the watch into the logbook, cleared the pegs from the board, and used the information to figure the vessel's dead reckoning track. Meanwhile, the helm of the new watch would begin recording the new sailing headings and speeds on the traverse board.

== See also ==
- Toletta de marteloio
- Rhumbline network
