= The Newcastle Sun =

20th-century Australian newspaper

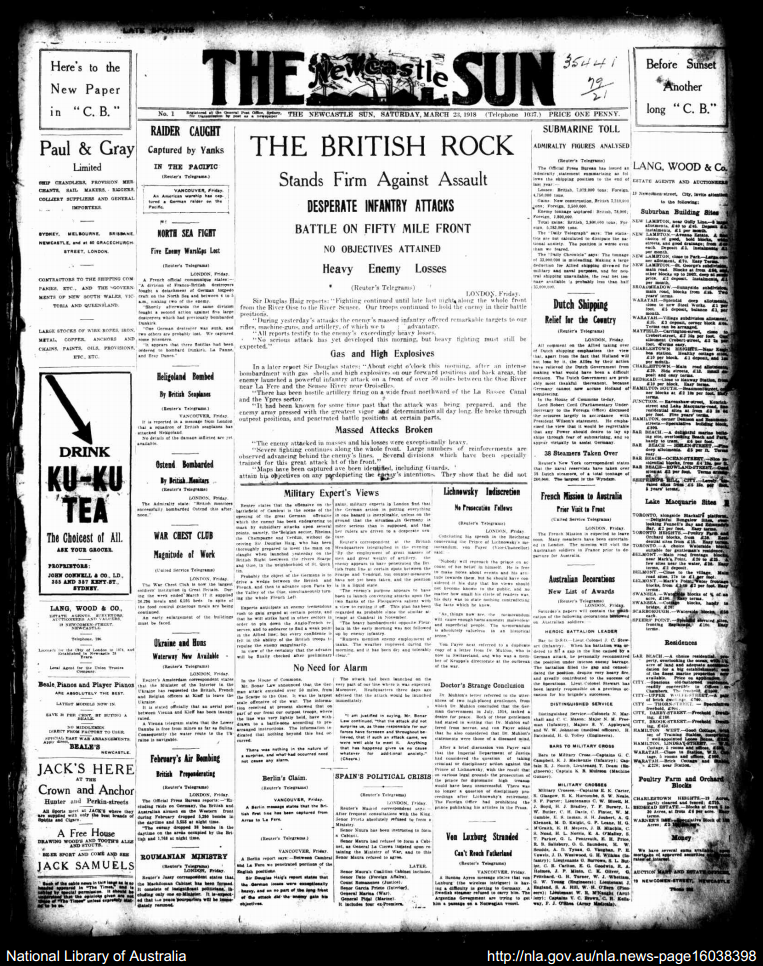
Front page of The Newcastle Sun on 23 March 1918.

The Newcastle Sun was a newspaper published in Newcastle, New South Wales, Australia. It had previously been published as The Northern Times.

== History ==
The Northern Times was first published in 1916. In 1918 the Times was purchased by Sir Hugh Denison, publisher of The Sun who changed the name to The Newcastle Sun. The Newcastle Sun was acquired by Newcastle Morning Herald in 1936 and continued until 1980 when it ceased publication.

A newspaper named The Northern Times (with the alternative title Northern Times and Newcastle Telegraph) had previously been published in Maitland from 1857-1860. The Northern Telegraph resumed publication in 1916, before being absorbed by the Northern Times in 1918.

== Digitisation ==
The paper has been digitised as part of the Australian Newspapers Digitisation Program project of the National Library of Australia.

== See also ==
- List of newspapers in Australia
- List of newspapers in New South Wales
