= Chip log =

Tool used to estimate the speed of a vessel through water

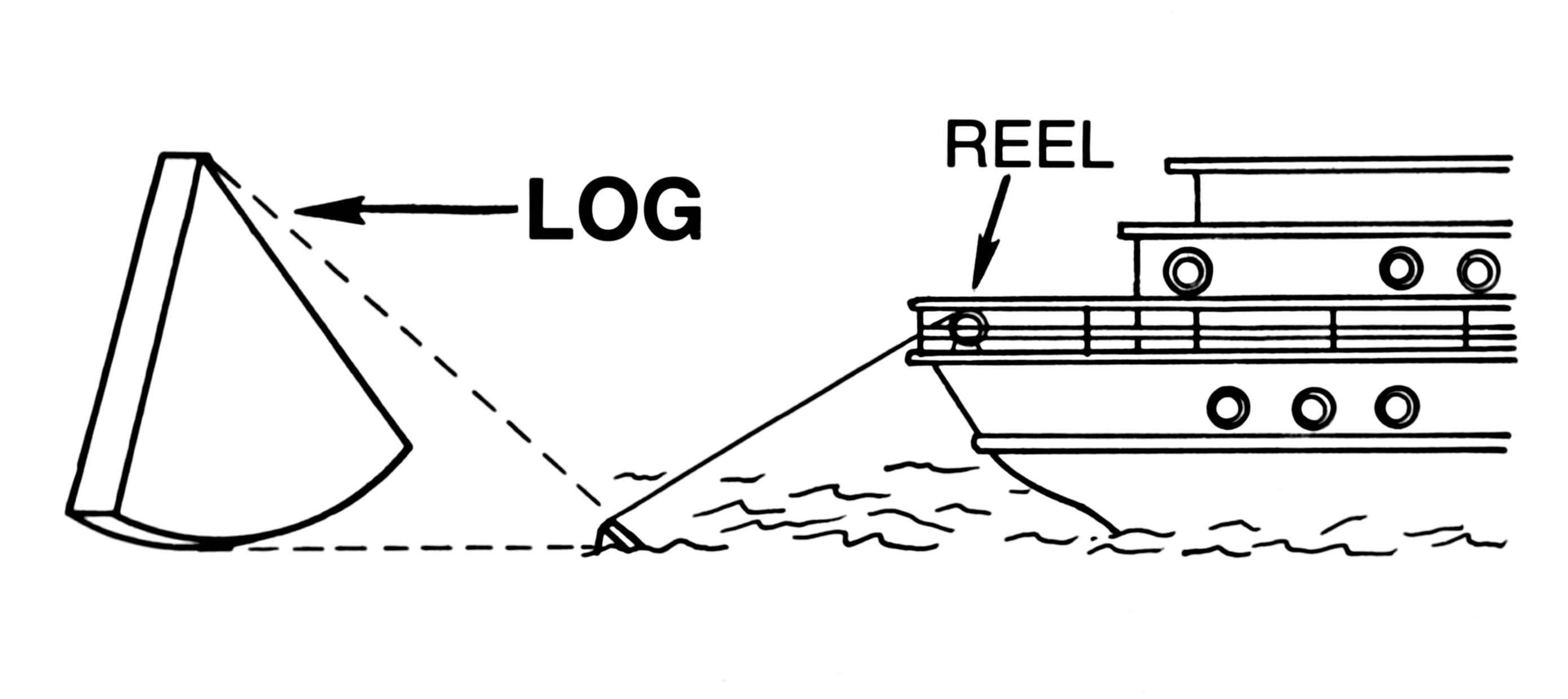
Diagram of a chip log attached to a log-line and reel on a ship

A chip log, also called common log, ship log, log line, the log and the line or just log, is a navigation tool mariners use to estimate the speed of a vessel through water. The word knot, to mean nautical mile per hour, derives from this measurement method.

== History ==
All nautical instruments that measure the speed of a ship through water are known as logs. This nomenclature dates back to the days of sail, when sailors attached a piece of lumber (a "log" of wood) to a rope knotted at regular intervals off the stern of a ship. Sailors counted the number of knots that passed through their hands in a given time to determine the ship's speed. Modern sailors and aircraft pilots still express speed in knots.

== Construction ==
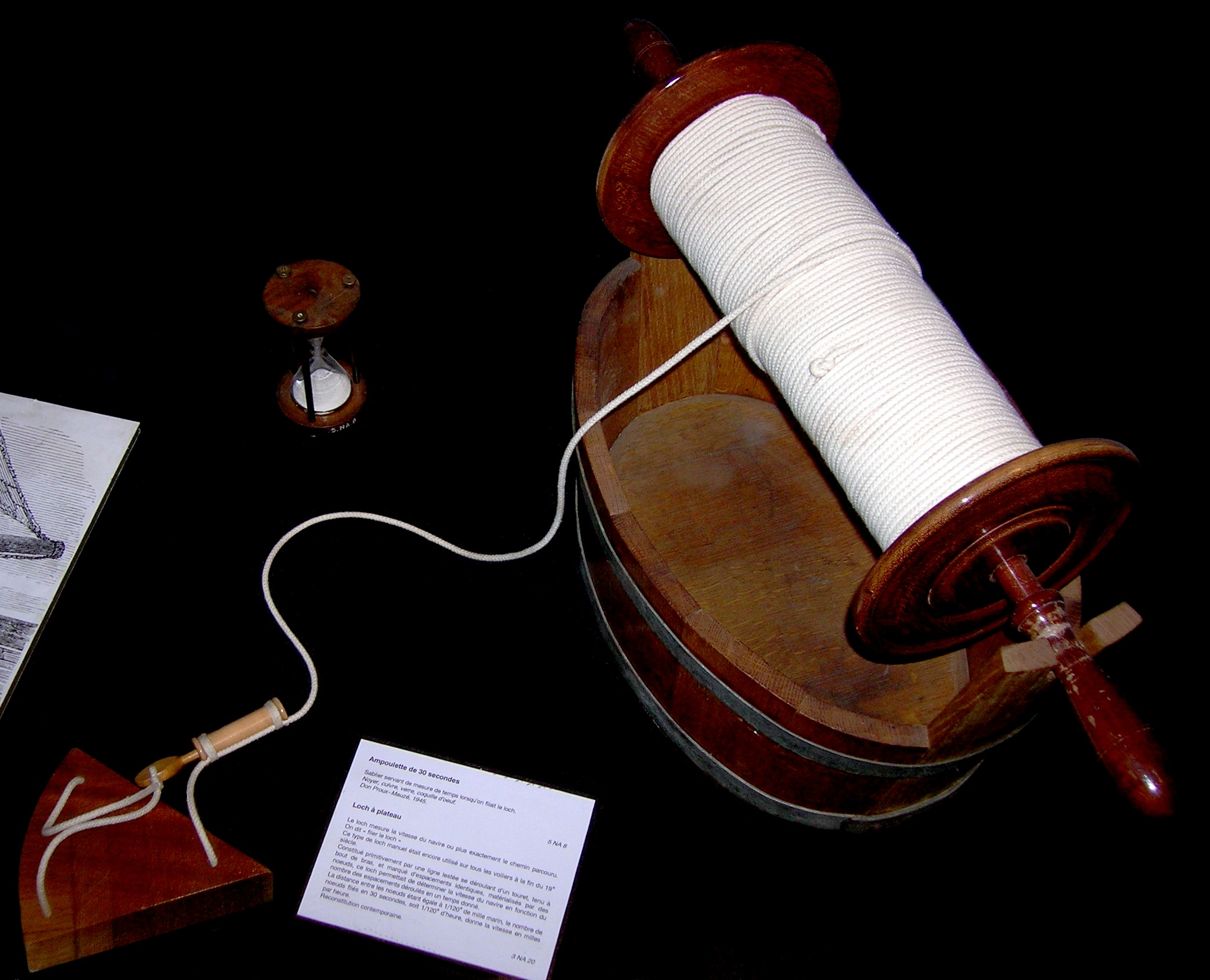
Model of chip log and associated kit. The reel of log-line is clearly visible. The first knot, marking the first nautical mile is visible on the reel just below the centre. The timing sandglass is in the upper left and the chip log is in the lower left. The small light-coloured wooden pin and plug form a release mechanism for two lines of the bridle. From the Musée de la Marine, Paris.

A chip log consists of a wooden board attached to a line (the log-line). The log-line has a number of knots at uniform intervals. The log-line is wound on a reel so the user can easily pay it out.

Over time, log construction standardized. The shape is a quarter circle, or quadrant with a radius of 5 inches (130 mm) or 6 inches (150 mm), and 0.5 inches (13 mm) thick. The log-line attaches to the board with a bridle of three lines that connect to the quadrant's vertex and the two ends of its arc. To ensure the log submerges and orients correctly in the water, the bottom of the log is weighted with lead. This provides more resistance in the water, and a more accurate and repeatable reading. The bridle attaches in such a way that a strong tug on the log-line makes one or two of the bridle's lines release, enabling a sailor to retrieve the log.

== Use ==
A navigator who needed to know the speed of the vessel had a sailor drop the log over the ship's stern. The log acted as a drogue, remaining roughly in place while the vessel moved away. The sailor let the log-line run out for a fixed time while counting the knots that passed over. The length of log-line passing (the number of knots) determined the reading.

== Origins ==
The first known device that measured speed is often claimed to be the Dutchman's log. This invention is attributed to the Portuguese Bartolomeu Crescêncio, who designed it in the end of the 15th century or in the beginning of the 16th century. A sailor threw a floating object overboard and used a sandglass to measure the time it took to pass between two points on deck. The first reference to a Dutchman's log is in 1623—later than the ship log. The Dutchman's log could be used with a brass tobacco box, rectangular with rounded ends. This box had tables on it to convert log timing to speed.

Mariners have used the log for a long time. The first known description of the device in print is in A Regiment for the Sea by William Bourne, in 1574. Bourne devised a half-minute sandglass for timing. At the time, a mile was reckoned as 5,000 feet, so in 30 seconds at one mile per hour, a ship would travel about 42 feet:

$$\text{pay distance in feet} =
\text{1 mph} \times
\text{5000 ft/mi} \times
\text{30 s} \times
\frac{\text{1 h}}{\text{3600 s}}$$

Initially, the log-line was not knotted and sailors measured the length directly on the line. With the introduction of the nautical mile as a standard unit of measure at sea in the 15th century, they began to mark the line at equal intervals proportional to the nautical mile and to the time interval used for measurement. Initially, the markings were simply knots in the line. Later, sailors worked knotted cords into the log-line. Many ships used knots spaced 8 fathoms (48 feet or 14.6 meters) apart, while other ships used the 7-fathom prescription. The time interval needs to be adjusted according to the distance between knots. Substituting 6,000 feet for 1 mile, the above formula yields 28.8 seconds for a distance of 8 fathoms. In fact, 28-second and 14-second glasses used to be common among navigation equipment.

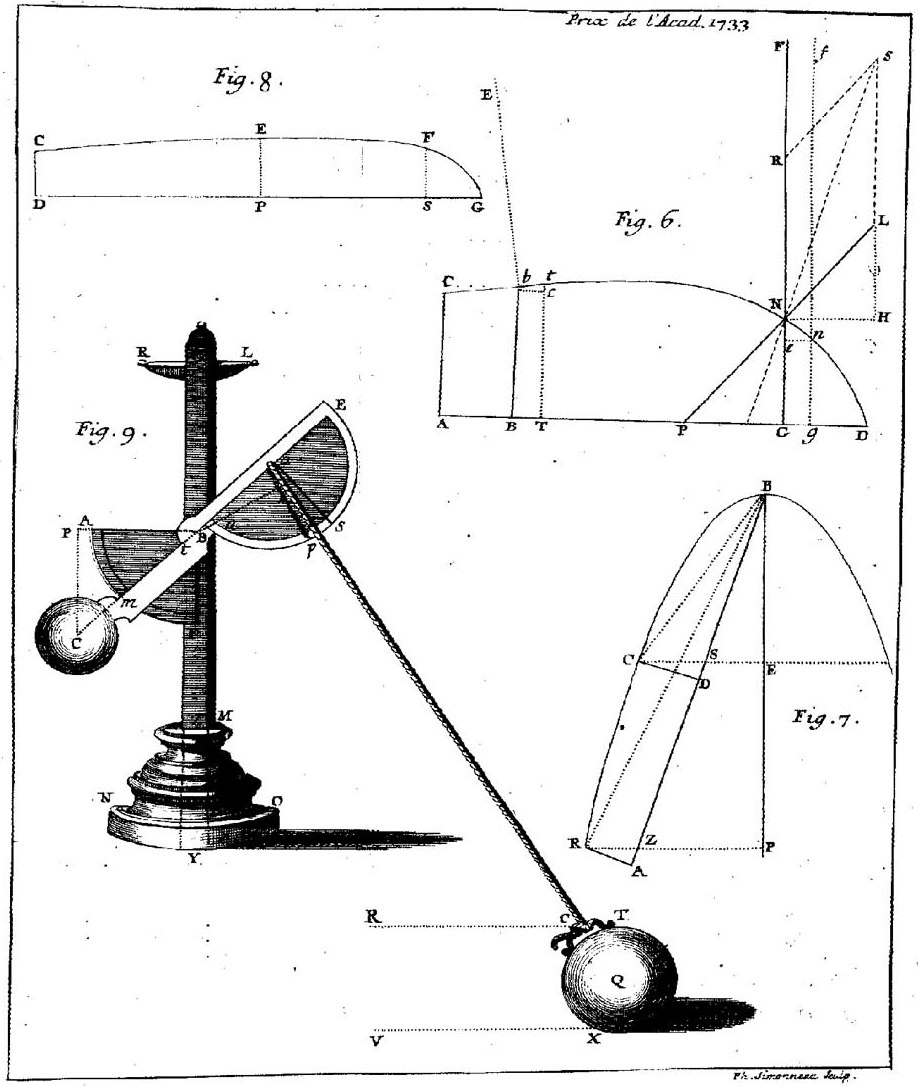
Chip log in the 18th century

== Accuracy and considerations by the navigator ==
Use of a log did not give an exact speed measure. The sailor had to incorporate a number of considerations:

- The amount of following sea
- The effect of currents
- Stretch of the line
- Inaccuracy in the time measurement—because ambient temperature, humidity, and sea state affected the sandglass

Frequent measurements helped mitigate some of these inaccuracies by averaging out individual errors, and experienced navigators could determine their speed through the water with a fair degree of accuracy. Because a log measures the speed through the water, some errors—especially the effect of currents, the movement of the water itself—could not be corrected. Navigators relied on position fixes to correct for these errors. Modern navigation tools, such as GPS, report speed over ground, and in general do not give the same result as a log when currents are present.

== More modern logs and replacements ==
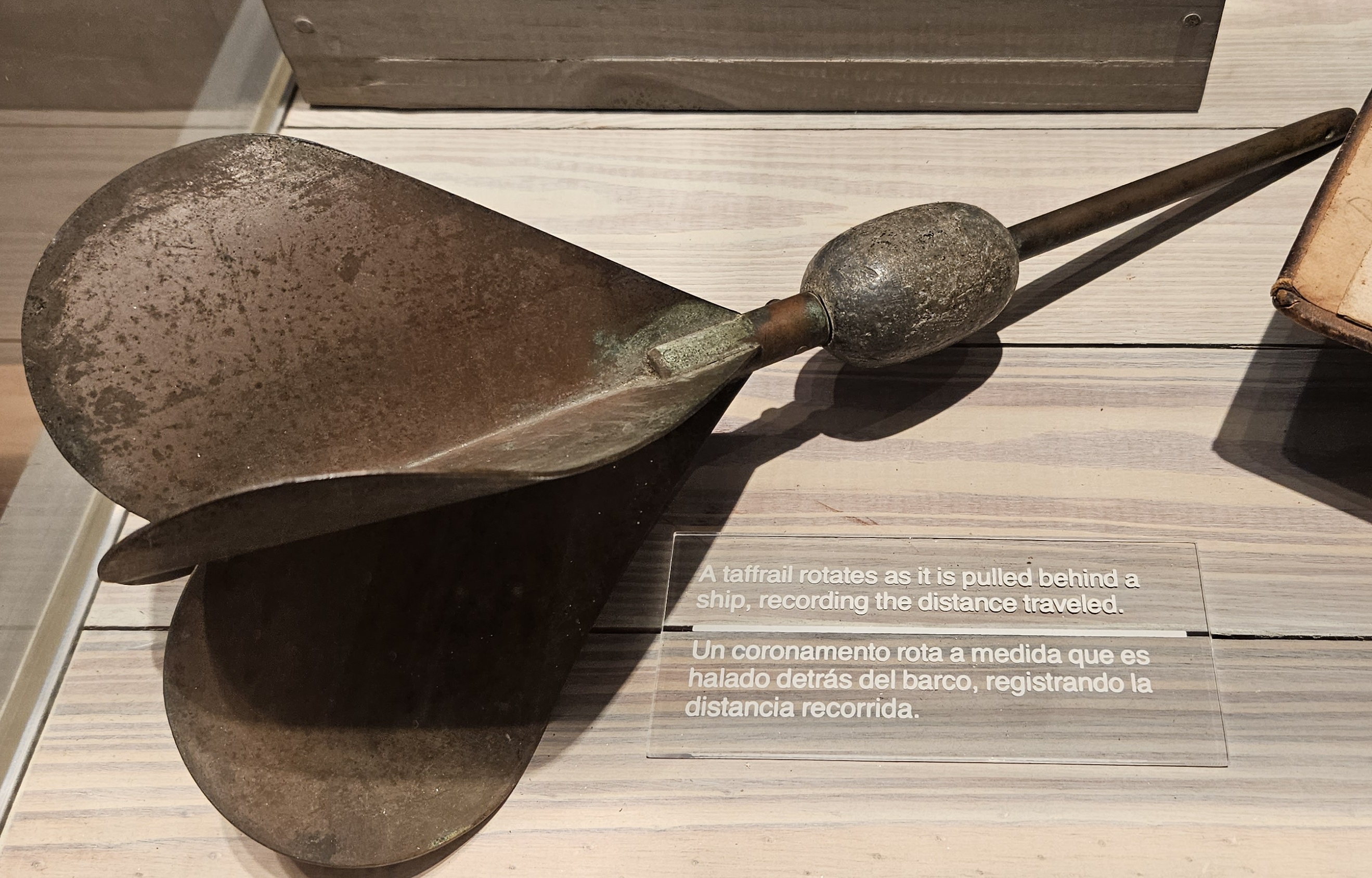
- Taffrail Log Rotator
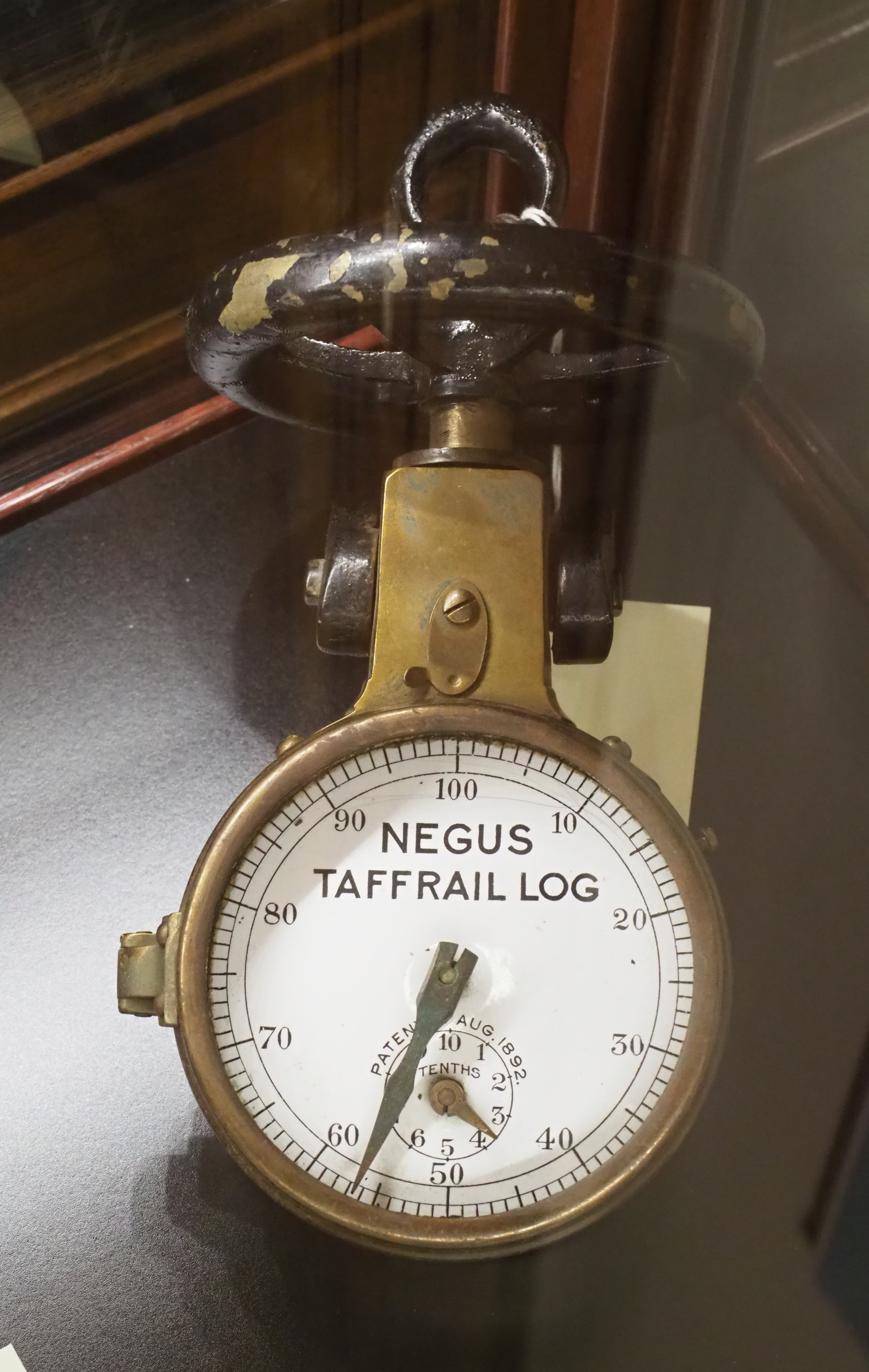
  Mechanical speed logs called patent logs or taffrail logs, operating on physical principles in a manner similar to a car's odometer by towing a vane or rotor from the stern (or taffrail) by a long line, were developed in the eighteenth century (or earlier) but became practical in the nineteenth century and replaced the traditional chip log. Examples of taffrail logs include those made by Thomas Walker & Son. Since the second half of the twentieth century, sailors continue to use more modern mechanical and electro-mechanical versions based upon a small impeller or paddle wheel attached to (or through) the bottom of the hull, especially on smaller yachts.
- Most commonly used however (especially on merchant ships) is the electromagnetic log, more reliable as there is no mechanism subject to breakdown.
- In recent years ultrasonic speed sensors have become available. These use two ultrasonic transducers—one forward, one aft—that send ultrasonic pulses through the water flowing past the hull. By calculating the time differential in pulse propagation from one sensor to the other, the device calculates the speed of the hull through the water.
- Doppler log: Today, a very accurate maritime speed measurement comes from Doppler measurement, either derived acoustically with Doppler-Sonar —or with radio interferometrically by Doppler measurement of satellite signals, such as those from the Global Positioning System (GPS). However, most commercial GPS systems are not configured to operate in this mode.

== See also ==
- Pitometer log (pit log) – a more modern form of log operating on the principle of differential pressure
- Dead reckoning – a form of navigation that depends on speed measurement
- Traverse board – a traditional tool used aboard ship to keep track of speed and heading
