= Thomas Walker & Son =

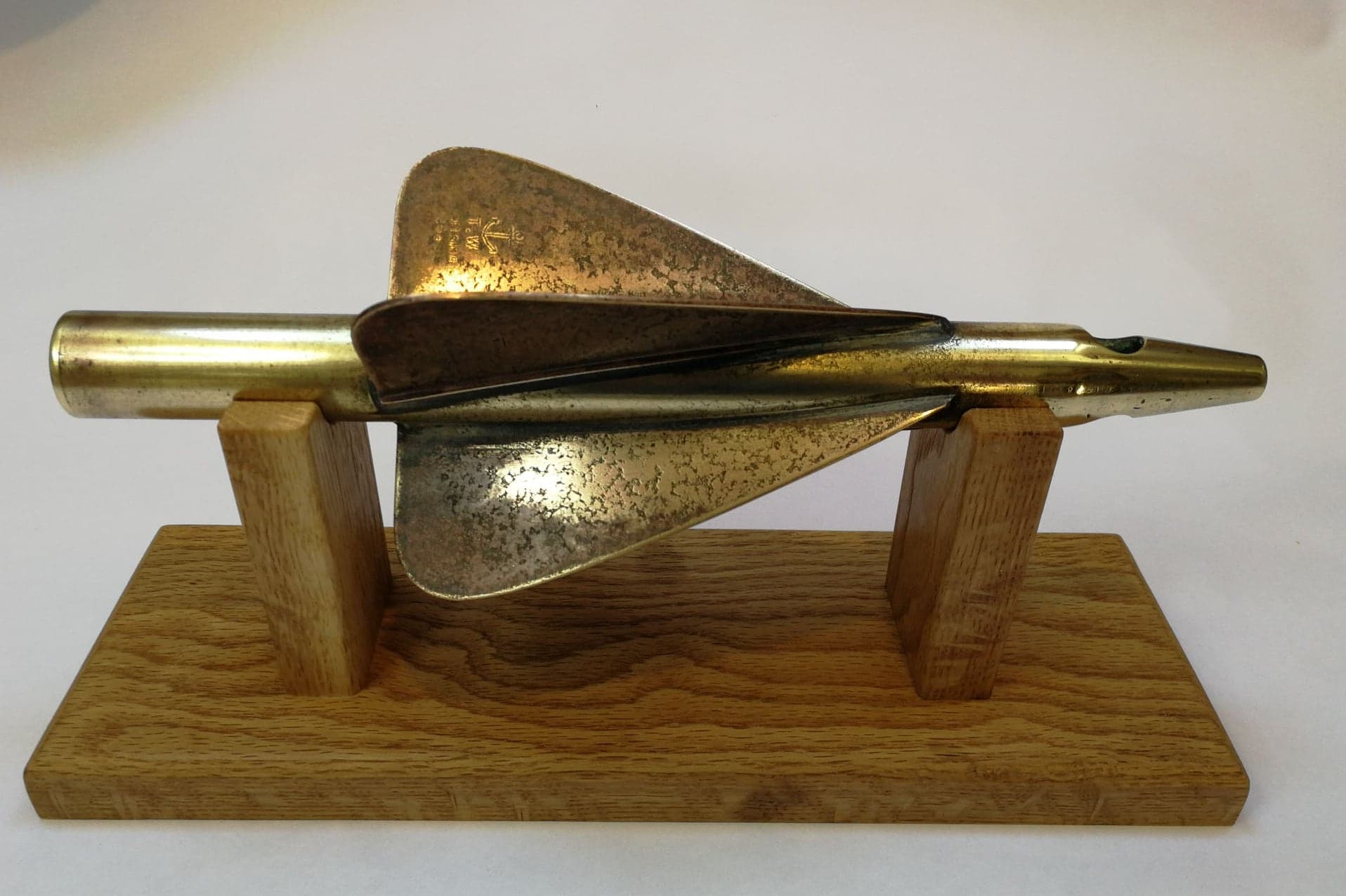
Excelsior log rotator

Thomas Walker & Son insignia

Thomas Walker & Son were inventors and makers of nautical instruments in the 19th and 20th centuries. The firm made one of the most commonly used navigation instruments, the 'log' which allowed sailors to measure distance at sea, one of the main measurements used in nautical navigation. The firm was founded by Thomas Walker in Birmingham in the 1830s.

== Thomas Walker ==
Thomas Walker was born in London in 1805. Before the age of ten he left home to find work in Stoke-on-Trent in the Potteries. He began his working life in the pottery industry, first as a labourer then later as a print assistant, when he revealed early signs of inventive skill by devising a rubber system for printing.

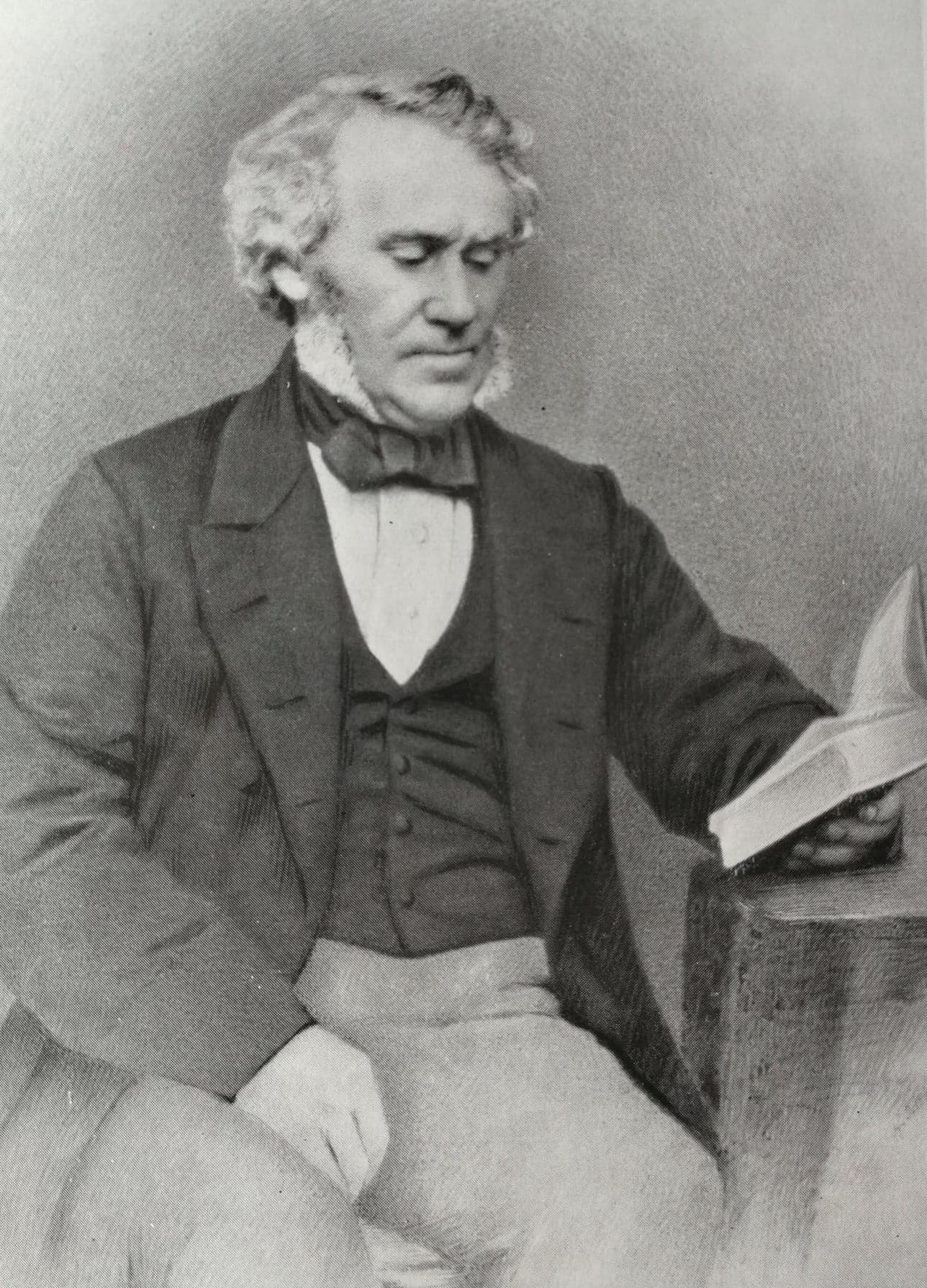
Thomas Walker

He was then apprenticed to a clockmaker which then grew into self-employment sustaining a struggling business as a clockmaker and repairer of watches and music boxes. His interest in nautical instruments was inspired by his uncle Edward Massey (1768-1852), who had invented and patented the first successful mechanical depth sounding machine and more importantly, the ship's log known as 'the Massey log'.

== Massey Log ==
The Massey Log was a significant improvement over the traditional wooden log, a rudimentary device consisting of a piece of timber dropped from the stern of a ship, the speed of its movement measured by counting the number of knots tied in the line to which it was attached. This process did not give an accurate measurement, but it was the best method available at the time. The term 'knot' as a measure of speed through the water arose from this system.

The Massey log consisted of a rotating metal screw which turned as the ship moved through the water. The revolutions of the screw, or 'rotator' were registered on dials, which were part of the mechanism in the water. The purpose of the ship's log (or chip log) was to measure the distance travelled by a ship through the water, crucial information in maritime navigation. An instrument capable of measuring distance accurately was vital, alongside a compass, a clock and maritime charts in the safe and accurate navigation of the seas.

== Thomas Walker & Son ==
Thomas Walker and his son, Thomas Ferdinand Walker (1838-1921) developed the original log design into a number of improved versions. An example is the Walker Harpoon Log, patented in 1861, which featured the inclusion of dials into the rotator, thereby reducing the total bulk of the instrument. This important innovation added to the company's success.

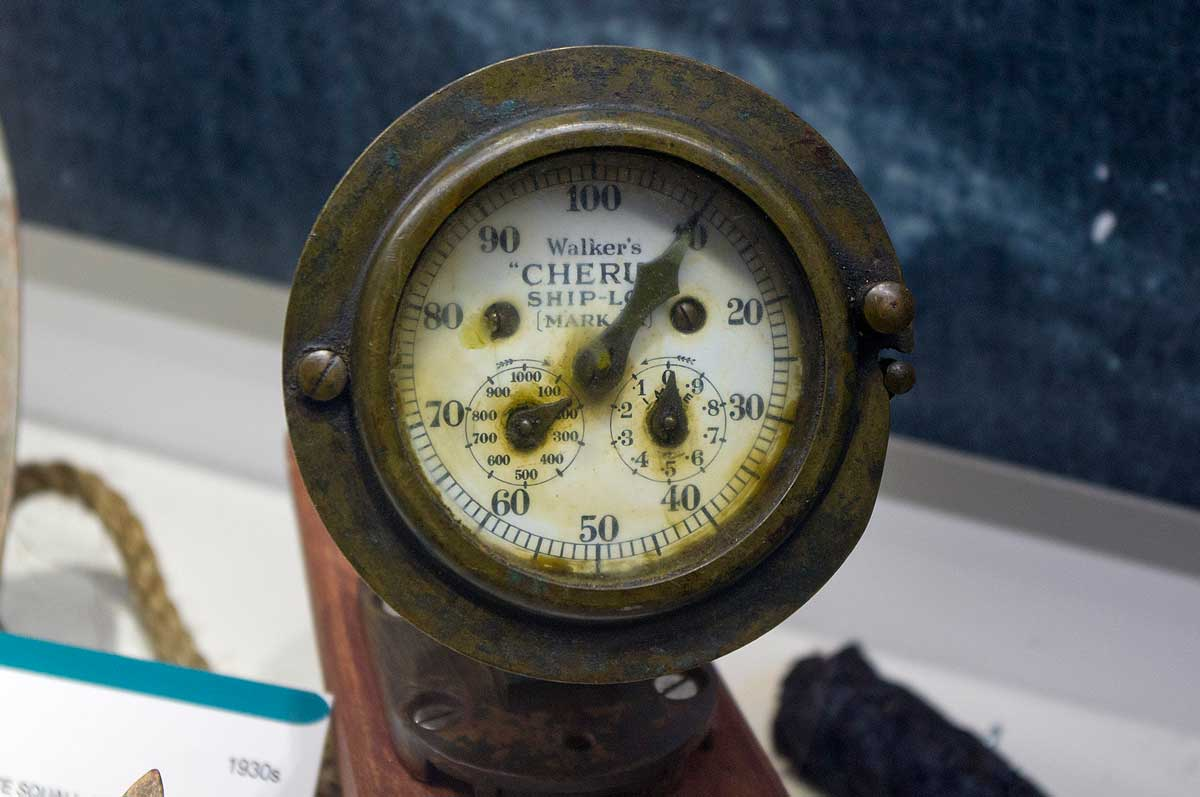
Dial of Walker's Cherub Taffrail Log .(Scalloway Museum)

Thomas Walker died in 1871, leaving his business in the hands of his son Thomas Ferdinand Walker. The younger Walker made a further fundamental improvement to the design of the Walker Harpoon Log by taking the dial out of the rotator and installing it remotely, on the side of the ship. First known as 'Walker's Taffrail Log', it became officially named the 'Cherub' log. The Cherub log was designed so that the log did not have to be hauled in every time a reading was required – a highly significant development. Production of the Cherub log started in the 1880s with 400 sales in the first year, by ten years later they were selling around 2,000 per year

Several different mechanical logs were designed and manufactured by different companies. These were generally known as 'patent logs'.

In 1902 a further improvement was made: the Walker Electric Log, designed so that the log could be read from various sites on the ship, including the ship's bridge. An important improvement made to the Walker logs was the use of a small impeller on the boat's hull below the waterline. This enabled the distance travelled by the ship to be calculated without the need to manually place a log in the water each time.

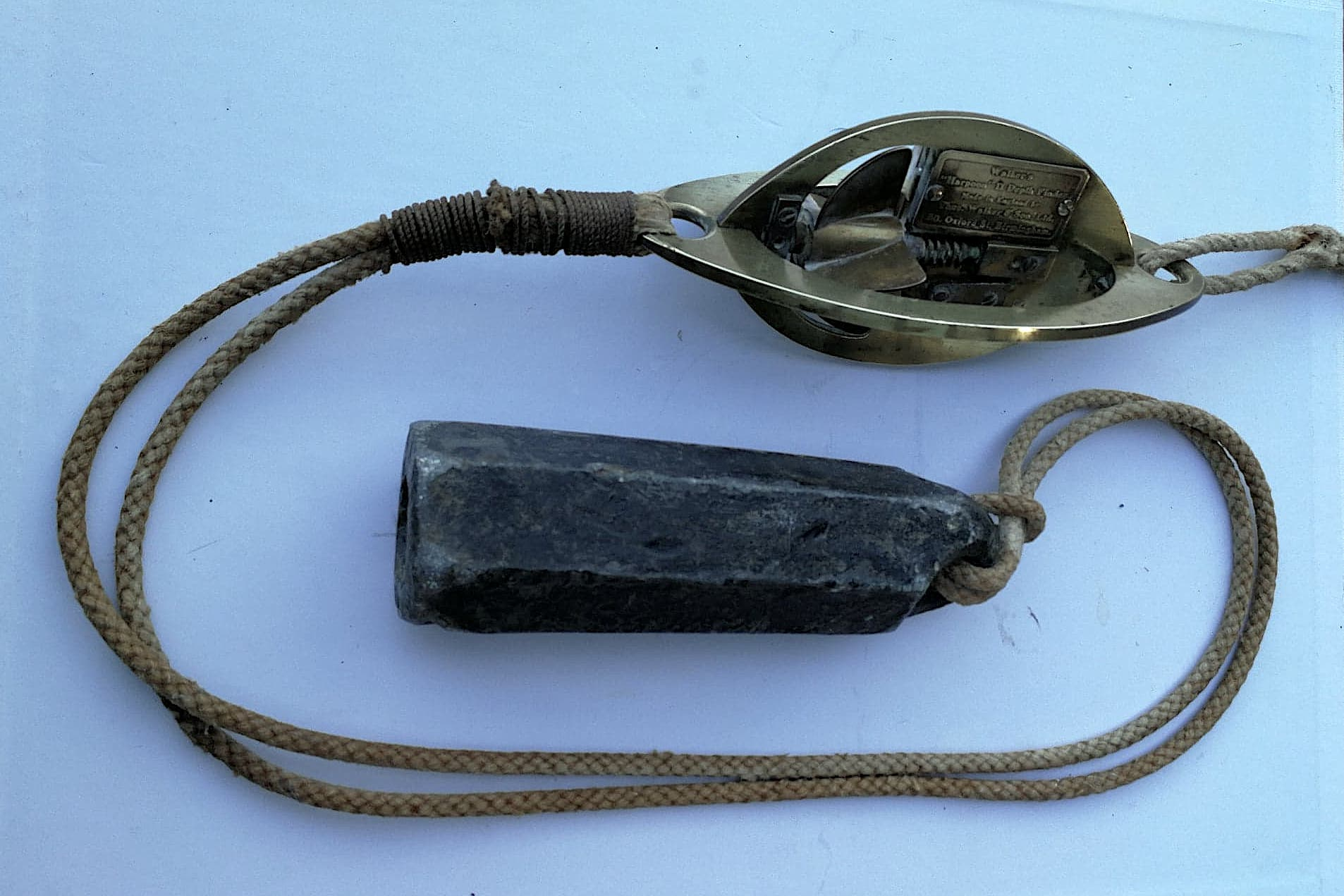
Walker Harpoon Depth Gauge

As well as ships logs, the company manufactured depth sounding instruments including the Harpoon Depth Finder. The instrument is lowered to the seabed and the rotor turns, rotating dials showing the depth of water. The rotor is free to rotate as the instrument is lowered, but when the line is drawn up a locking piece drops down and holds it in place. The lead weight has a depression in the bottom into which wax can be poured. By examining the wax, the sailor may be able to identify the nature of the seabed, for example, if it is sandy.

In 1905 the company was incorporated as a limited company (Ltd).

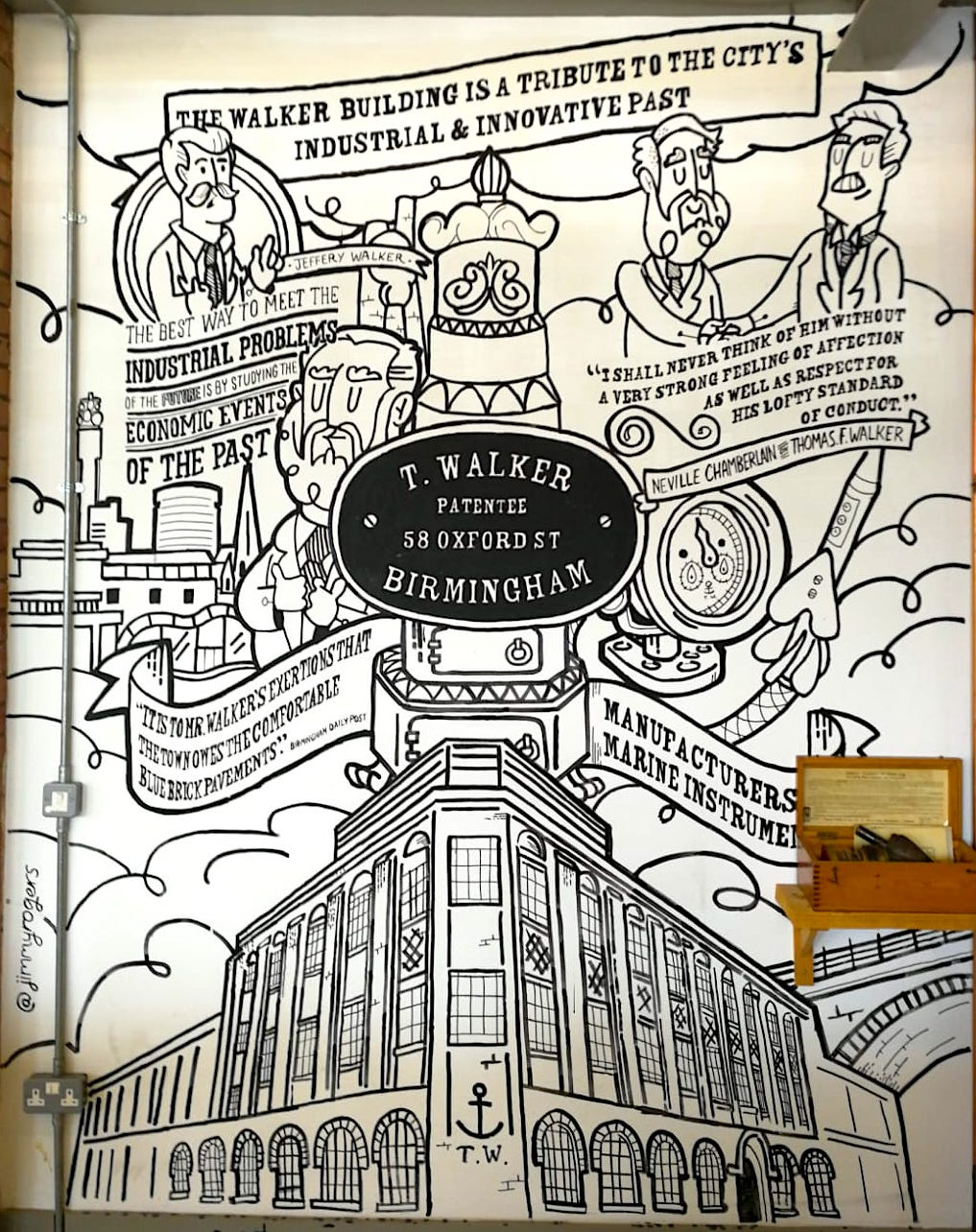
Mural at 28 Oxford Street where Thomas Walker & Son were based.

The firm was based at 58 Oxford Street, Digbeth, Birmingham. The factory was built for Thomas Walker & Son by Buckland & Farmer of Birmingham in 1912. It is a Grade II 'Listed building'.

In 2002 Lilley & Gillie Ltd, manufacturer of magnetic compasses, acquired Thomas Walker & Son Ltd (Walker Marine), adding Walker's electromechanical speed logs and anemometers to the firm's list of products. The name continued to trade, as it had since 1838, under the brand name Walker Marine.
