= HMAS Carroo =

Lighter of the Royal Australian Navy

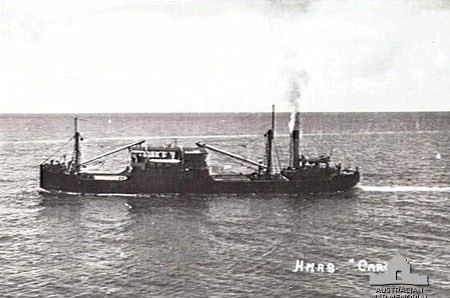
- HMAS Carroo

History

United Kingdom
- Owner: G. S. Yuill (1897)
- Builder: Edward Bros., North Shields
- Launched: 17 May 1897
- Fate: Bought by Adelaide Steamship Company in 1897.

Australia
- Name: Carroo (1897-1954); Kgari(1954-1976)
- Namesake: Carroo - Aboriginal name for creek; Kgari - Aboriginal name for 'Fraser Island' or 'paradise'
- Owner: Adelaide Steamship Company
- In service: 1897
- Out of service: 1942
- Fate: Requisitioned Royal Australian Navy in 1942, Scuttled in 1976 in Hervey Bay.

Australia
- Name: Carroo
- In service: 1942
- Out of service: 1946
- Fate: Returned to owners in 1946

General characteristics
- Type: Steel twin screw
- Tonnage: 272 GRT
- Length: 130 ft 5 in (39.75 m)
- Beam: 25 ft 1 in (7.65 m)
- Draught: 8 ft 9 in (2.67 m)
- Installed power: 140 inverted horsepower
- Propulsion: Twin compound steam engine
- Speed: 10 knots (19 km/h; 12 mph)

HMAS Carroo was a lighter of the Royal Australian Navy (RAN) between 1942 and 1946 during World War II. Built for G. S. Yuill, London, she was sold to the Adelaide Steamship Company in September 1897. She was requisitioned by the RAN in June 1942 until she was returned to her owners in 1946. She was sold in 1954 to Hopewell Steam Shipping Company Ltd, Maryborough and was renamed Kgari. She was scuttled at Roy Rufus Reef, Hervey Bay on 19 September 1976.

== Construction and design ==
The ship was built in 1897 by Edward Bros., North Shields for the Australia-Oriental Line (G. S. Yuill) of London.

== Operational service ==
The ship was bought in September 1897 by the Adelaide Steamship Company and was rebuilt in 1904.

She was gutted by fire on 6 March 1920. The ship was carrying a cargo including 'benzine' and was near Dunk Island when, at 5 am, there was a violent explosion in the after hold, followed almost immediately by an explosion in the forward hold. Flames higher than the mast emerged from the after hold and set fire to the ship's boats and superstructure. The first mate was sitting on a hatch at the time of the first explosion and disappeared; some human bones were found later inside the vessel. He was the only fatality, although the engineer was badly burned. The crew fought the raging fire for some hours. The crew were rescued by the Karuah, with all being taken aboard by 1 pm. The Karuah towed the still blazing hulk to Townsville and her crew later claimed salvage rights.

The hull was rebought from the underwriters and refitted in 1921 at the Cleveland Foundry slipway in Townsville. She returned to service, in August 1921, carrying sugar.

She was requisitioned by the RAN in June 1942 for service as a lighter during World War II and she was returned to her owners at the end of hostilities. She was sold in 1954 to Hopewell Steam Shipping Company Ltd and renamed Kgari.

== Fate ==
She was scuttled at Roy Rufus Reef, Hervey Bay on 19 September 1976.
