= Electromagnetic log =

An Electromagnetic Log, sometimes called an "EM log", is an electronic sensor which measures the speed of a vessel through sea water. Like many other technologies, its name derives from the traditional chip log. It makes use of Faraday's law of induction by measuring the EMF induced in water moving through a magnetic field generated by the sensor.

== Mechanism of operation ==
1. Electricity flows through a coil inside the device, inducing a magnetic field perpendicular to the flow of water
2. Since sea water is an electrical conductor, an EMF is induced when it moves relative to the magnetic field, according to Faraday's law.
3. This EMF creates a local voltage differential, which can be measured by two electrodes in contact with the water.
4. The speed of the water flowing past the sensor is directly proportional to this measured voltage.

Some EM logs have three electrodes arranged in a right triangle; this allows the speed to be calculated even if the electrodes are not perfectly aligned with respect to the flow.

== Advantages ==
- No moving parts
- Less affected by sea growth than pit swords
- Less complex than Doppler logs
- Typically accurate to 0.03m/s
- Capable of measuring transverse as well as longitudinal speeds

== Disadvantages ==
- Must be calibrated for water conductivity, which depends on salinity and temperature
- Does not work in fresh water
- Measurement is influenced by the boundary layer (water is slowed down near the hull due to friction)
- Measures speed relative to the water, not to the Earth

== See also ==
- Pitometer log
