= Drift meter =

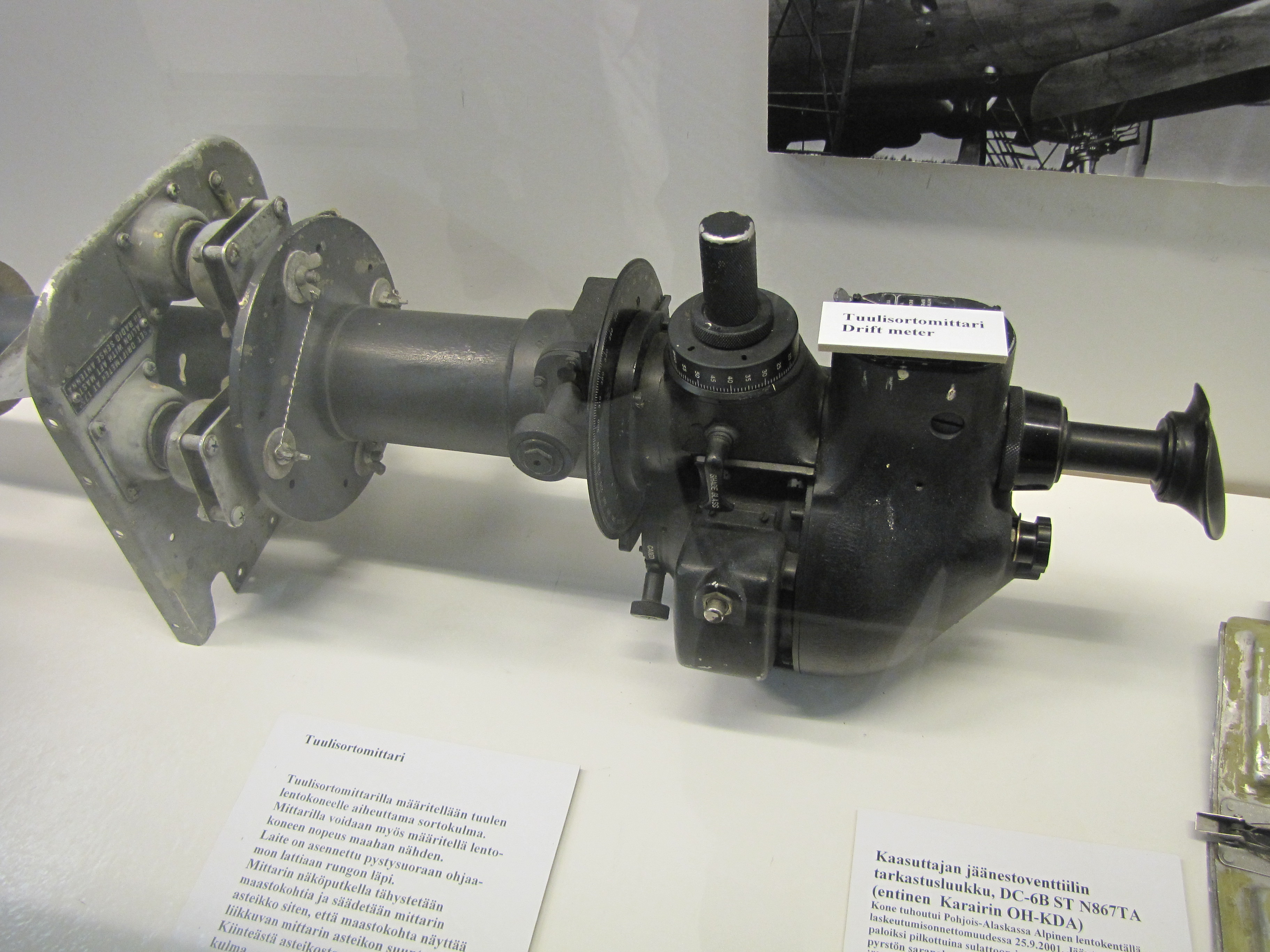
Douglas DC-6B drift meter in Finnish Aviation Museum.

A drift meter, also drift indicator and drift sight, is an optical device used to improve dead reckoning for aircraft navigation by measuring wind effect on flight.

== Design ==
A drift meter consists of a small telescope extended vertically through the bottom of the aircraft with the eyepiece inside the fuselage at the navigator's station. A reticle, typically consisting of spaced parallel lines, is rotated until objects on the ground are seen to be moving parallel to the vertical lines. The angle of the reticle then indicates the aircraft's drift angle due to winds aloft. It is also used to calculate the ground speed by measuring the time it takes for an object on the ground to pass from the upper to the lower horizontal line of the reticle.

== History ==
USAAF Type B-3 drift meter from Boeing B-17D

Drift meters were extensively used in World War II by bomber aircraft. Typically, fighter aircraft were not equipped with this kind of relatively sophisticated navigational equipment. For instance, in the Pacific Theater, where navigation was difficult due to scarcity of land or other prominent features, fighters were often guided by bombers that had a dedicated navigator and navigational equipment.

Some drift meters were purely optical (e.g., USAAF Type B-5 drift meter), while others included electrically powered gyroscope (e.g., USAAF Type B-3 drift meter). USAAF Type B-5 drift meter was also equipped with a simple flight computer (a rotating wheel) to calculate the ground speed from the measured time that takes for a ground object to pass from the top to the bottom of the reticle.

== Applications ==
=== Wind correction from drift angle ===
For practical purposes under ordinary conditions, the drift angle measured by the drift meter can be used for wind correction angle in the heading in order to put the aircraft back on the correct course, where the aircraft heading is turned into the opposite direction of the drift. However, theoretically there is a difference between the two angle values depending on conditions.

=== Wind vector from drift angles in two headings ===
A diagram to derive the wind from drift angles in two headings

It is possible to derive the wind speed and the wind direction from the measurements of drift angle by the drift meter in two (or more) different headings. One method is to do it computationally by using several trigonometric functions, which is not so trivial. An alternative method is to do it graphically by using a "double-drift diagram", which is a combination of two wind triangles (see the figure). In this method, two vectors are first drawn from the center of a plane, where each vector represents one of the headings at a given airspeed (scaling factor is used, e.g., 10 cm is 100 knots). The next step is to draw a drift line from the tip of the vector into the opposite direction at an angle equal to the drift (i.e., angle with respect to the line in the opposite direction of the vector), for each heading vector. The intersection of the two (or more) drift lines then indicates the beginning of the wind vector, while the center of the plane indicates the tip of the wind vector. The length of the wind vector provides the wind speed (using the same scaling factor as for the airspeed), while its direction gives the wind direction.

=== Wind vector from zero-drift heading ===
It is also possible to derive the wind vector by flying the heading, where the drift meter measures zero drift. This means that the aircraft is either flying directly into the wind or directly with the wind. Since the ground speed in that heading can be measured by the drift meter, one can calculate the wind speed by subtracting the airspeed from the ground speed. The sign of the difference indicates whether the wind direction is in the zero-drift heading or reciprocal to it. If the difference is zero, there is no wind present.

== See also ==
- Air navigation
- Dead reckoning
- Wind triangle
