= Siegfried Knemeyer =

German-American aeronautical engineer and aviator

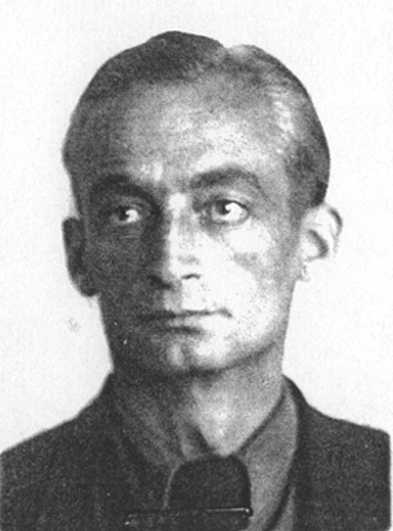
- Born: 5 April 1909; Ellerbusch, Germany
- Died: 11 April 1979 (aged 70); Yellow Springs, Ohio, United States
- Military career
- Allegiance: Nazi Germany (1939–1945); West Germany (1945–1947); United States (1947–1979)
- Branch: Luftwaffe; United States Air Force
- Service years: 1939–45, 1947–79
- Rank: Oberst (colonel)
- Nicknames: Knall Max, Knall Kne, Star Gazer
- Awards: Iron Cross First and Second Class; German Cross in Gold; Knight's Cross of the Iron Cross; Department of Defense Distinguished Civilian Service Award
- Other work: Aircraft consultant

Siegfried Knemeyer (5 April 1909 – 11 April 1979) was a German-American aeronautical engineer, aviator and the Head of Technical Development at the Reich Ministry of Aviation of Nazi Germany during World War II.

== Early career ==
Knemeyer attended the Technische Hochschule Berlin, from which he graduated in 1933 with a dual major of theoretical experimental physics and aeronautical engineering. He was affiliated with the Academic Flying Group. In 1935 Knemeyer was a flight instructor for the Reich Air Ministry, a civilian organisation at the disposal of the German military.

By 1936 Knemeyer's invention of the Dreieckrechner hand-held flight computing device, similar to American Lt. Philip Dalton's contemporaneous E6-B invention, was starting to become commonplace in both military Luftwaffe aviation and German civil pilots' use.

He enlisted in the Luftwaffe after the outbreak of World War II, on 4 September 1939.

== World War II ==
After serving as Field Marshal Walter von Brauchitsch's pilot during the brief Invasion of Poland, Knemeyer was assigned to the Rowehl Reconnaissance Group. During his time with this group Knemeyer flew hundreds of reconnaissance flights in every theatre of the German war. In autumn 1939, Knemeyer flew a reconnaissance mission to Narvik, Norway to observe whether the British had occupied Narvik seaport. While on this mission, flying a Focke-Wulf Fw 200 Condor, Knemeyer took photographs of the British Home Fleet at Scapa Flow and outmanoeuvred two Spitfires to escape with the photographs. Based on this intelligence U-47 of the Kriegsmarine sank the British battleship HMS Royal Oak in a famous incident. For this, Knemeyer was awarded his first Iron Cross.

In April 1943, Knemeyer was appointed the technical officer of General Dietrich Peltz, who was responsible for the air war against England. In this capacity he established a program focused on capturing and re-fitting enemy aircraft, as a means to gain a tactical advantage and assist the Luftwaffe's internal research efforts.

In 1943, alarmed that Allied advances in aviation technology threatened to tip the balance of the war against Germany, Hermann Göring convened a conference at Carinhall among his senior leadership. Peltz brought Knemeyer with him to this conference, and Göring was enamored with Knemeyer's innovative ideas. After the conference Göring declared "Knemeyer is my boy!" and in July 1943 reassigned him to be his personal technical advisor. Several months later Knemeyer was promoted to Oberst and made Director of Research and Development of the Luftwaffe. Göring came to call Knemeyer the "Star Gazer" and would greet him with the question, "Now, my Star Gazer, what do you see in your crystal ball?" In November 1943, Knemeyer was appointed Head of Technical Development for the Reichsluftfahrtministerium (RLM), under Oberst Edgar Petersen's command.

By February 1944, Knemeyer had surprisingly never flown a German heavy bomber of any sort, until he got his turn to fly one of the Heinkel He 177B prototypes on 24 February at the Wiener Neustadt military airfield. His favourable opinion on the twin tail-equipped He 177 V102 aircraft's "excellent handling qualities" compelled him to recommend that the Heinkel firm place the He 177B design's priority above that of the Heinkel He 343 four-jet medium bomber design, which was still in its early stages.

Shortly after rising to his top-level technical appointment within the RLM, Knemeyer became close with old colleague, General Werner Baumbach. Knemeyer was included on a Special Committee of top-ranking Luftwaffe administrators in November 1943 for the purpose of advocating broad adoption of and investment in the Me 262. Aviation book authors J. Richard Smith and Eddie Creek credit Knemeyer and General Adolf Galland as the men responsible for Germany's finally putting the Me 262A-1a jet fighter into mass production.

In 1944, the German hierarchy placed a renewed call for creative plans to reverse the now-inevitable defeat descending on Nazi Germany. Familiar with the newest technologies, Knemeyer conceived a plan to develop a long-range bomber that would drop a radioactive "dirty bomb" on New York City, in hopes of intimidating the United States out of the war. This idea was embraced and Knemeyer set up and personally supervised a competition between the three most promising technologies: Wernher von Braun's Aggregat A-9 rocket missile and A-10 booster rocket; Eugen Sänger's Silbervogel, and the Horten brothers' Horten Ho 229 turbojet-powered flying wing fighter. While this competition accelerated the progress of leading edge aviation technology, of these specified aerospace design projects, only one prototype example of the Ho 229 (the Versuchs-Zwei, or Ho 229 V2 second prototype) flew prior to the end of the war.

During the second week of April, Knemeyer was requested by Albert Speer to fly him to Greenland as a way to escape the Soviets. Knemeyer located a BV 222 aircraft as suitable for this task to get to Greenland from Travelmunde airport in the North of Berlin. However, Speer never made the trip.

Near the end of the war, Werner Baumbach gave Knemeyer his car and Knemeyer fled west. On a country road outside Hamburg, Knemeyer spotted British soldiers. He left his car and fled on foot. But British soldiers found him hiding under a bridge and arrested him.

== Operation Paperclip ==
Knemeyer was arrested in the British Zone of Occupation and was interned in Münster and then at the Latimer prison camp. Knemeyer was part of Operation Paperclip and in June 1948 he was awarded a permanent contract of employment with the United States Air Force, Air Materiel Command. His family was then able to join him in America. Knemeyer began with the United States War Department on 1 July 1947. As acknowledgement of his contributions, in 1966 he received the highest civilian award granted by the U.S. military, the U.S. Department of Defense Distinguished Civilian Service Award.

== Awards ==
In Germany

- Iron Cross (1939)
  - 2nd Class
  - 1st Class
- German Cross in Gold on 27 July 1942 as Hauptmann in the 4.Staffel/Aufklärungsgruppe of the OB.d.L.
- Knight's Cross of the Iron Cross on 29 August 1943 as Major im Stabsamt des RLM (with the staff of the Air Ministry) and Gruppenkommandeur of Aufklärungs-Lehr-Gruppe of the OB.d.L.

In the United States

- Department of Defense Distinguished Civilian Service Award
