= E6B =

E6B, E-6B, or E6-B may refer to:

- Boeing E-6 Mercury, command post aircraft family by Boeing
- E6-B flight computer, a form of circular slide rule used in aviation
- EMD E6, passenger train locomotive with version named E6B
