= P. V. H. Weems =

Philip Van Horn Weems (March 29, 1889 – June 2, 1979) was a United States Navy officer, inventor of navigational instruments and methods, including the Weems Plotter and the Second Setting Watch, and author of navigational textbooks.

== Biography ==
Weems was born in Tennessee, the son of Joseph Burch and May Elizabeth Rye Weems. When he was a child, he and his six brothers and one sister were orphaned.

He received an appointment to the United States Naval Academy at Annapolis in 1908. At the Academy, he excelled at various sports, and was an All-American center on the Navy football team. Later, he was selected for the 1920 U.S. Olympic wrestling team; however, there is no record of him actually competing in the Games. He graduated in the class of 1912 and was commissioned an ensign. He specialized in navigation and taught at the Academy. In 1915, he married Margaret Thackray.

In 1927, Weems was sent to the Aircraft Squadron Battle Fleet, before being assigned to the tanker USS Cuyama as its executive officer from 1928 to 1930. He retired for the first time in 1933 with the rank of lieutenant commander. Weems returned to active service in 1942, serving in World War II as a convoy commander, for which he was awarded a Bronze Star. He was promoted to captain in 1945 and retired the following year.

With the dawn of the space age, he was called upon to teach space navigation at the Naval Academy from 1961 to 1962.

The Weems had two sons and a daughter, Margaret. Both sons predeceased him. Major Philip van Horn Weems Jr. was killed in the southwest Pacific in 1943, while Lieutenant Commander George Thackray "Bee" Weems died while testing an airplane in 1951.

Philip Van Horn Weems died on June 2, 1979, at the age of ninety.

== Navigational contributions ==
Weems and his wife established the Weems School of Navigation in 1927. After Charles Lindbergh completed his celebrated solo flight across the Atlantic Ocean, the Navy assigned Weems to teach him celestial navigation for a month in 1928. Fred Noonan, Amelia Earhart's navigator on her last flight, considered him his mentor.

After his first retirement, Weems wrote several books; Air Navigation (1931) was particularly well received, and was awarded a gold medal by the Aero Club of France.

In 1935, he patented the Mark II Plotter. Another invention was the Second Setting Watch; by adding a rotating 60-second bezel which could be locked in place, Weems created a simple way of allowing troops to align their watches' seconds hands with each other and thus co-ordinate separate military actions to the second. In old movies, when an officer tells his men "synchronise your watches", they are turning their Weems bezels. But according to the Institute of Navigation, "his proudest achievement" was the Star Altitude Curves, which simplified finding one's position; it was adopted by the Army Air Corps prior to World War II.

== Honors ==
In 1953, Weems was awarded the Magellanic Premium, an honor given for contributions to navigation, astronomy or natural philosophy. It has been awarded only 33 times to 40 people since it was established in 1786. In 1955, he was awarded the Harold Spencer-Jones Gold Medal by the Royal Institute of Navigation in recognition of his contributions to navigation.

In 1960, Weems received a gold medal from the American Institute of Navigation. The institute also created an annual award named after him. In 1968, the National Geographic Society awarded him the John Oliver la Gorce Medal. Mount Weems in Antarctica is named in his honor.

His papers are held by the Tennessee State Library and Archives.

== See also ==
- Philip Dalton
