= Philip Dalton =

Lt. Philip Dalton (April 1, 1903 – July 25, 1941) was a United States military scientist, pilot and engineer. Dalton is best known for his invention of several slide-rule analog flight computers, the most famous being the E6-B.

Dalton was born in Scotia, New York, to William and Ida Dalton.

He studied engineering at Cornell University's College of Engineering, where he joined the ROTC. Upon graduation, he received a commission as a lieutenant of field artillery in the United States Army Reserve. He continued his studies at Princeton University, where he received a master's degree in physics, and Harvard, after which he resigned his Army commission and joined the United States Naval Reserve. He received his wings at NAS Pensacola, and flew scout planes on the cruiser Northampton.

While serving as US Naval Reserve Pilot, Dalton took an interest in slide-rule flight computers. His first models were designed in the early 1930s, but in 1932 his first version of the E-6B, originally known as the "Dalton Dead Reckoning Computer", came into existence.

On October 30, 1940, Dalton was recalled to active duty and assigned to Naval Air Station Anacostia, across the river from Washington, DC, to help train naval aviators. On July 24, 1941, Dalton and Harry Lee Rogers, Jr., a student pilot, were killed when their aircraft crashed near Hybla Valley, Virginia. By this time, Dalton's devices were in widespread use by all aviation branches of the US and British military services.
