= Stadimeter =

Type of optical rangefinder

A stadimeter operator adjusts the lower knob until the top and bottom of the object are aligned, and then reads the corresponding range off the edge of the lower knob through a small magnifying lens.

A stadimeter is an optical device for estimating the range to an object of known height by measuring the angle between the top and bottom of the object as observed at the device. It is similar to a sextant, in that the device is using mirrors to measure an angle between two objects but differs in that one dials in the height of the object. It is one of several types of optical rangefinders, and does not require a large instrument, and so was ideal for hand-held implementations or installation in a submarine's periscope. A stadimeter is a type of analog computer.

== Development and use ==
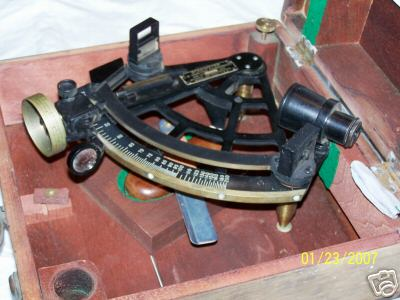
A Mk 5 Mod 0 US Navy Stadimeter made in 1942 by Schick Inc. of Stamford CT.

The hand held stadimeter was developed by Bradley Allen Fiske (1854–1942), an officer in the United States Navy. It was designed for gunnery purposes, but its first sea tests, conducted in 1895, showed that it was equally useful for fleet sailing and for navigation. It was normally kept on the bridge and used from there and on the bridge wings to keep warships at the proper distance from one another when steaming in formation and for use in convoys.

The United States Navy Bureau of Ships contracted on several occasions for orders of hand-held stadimeters starting shortly after its development in the late 1890s. By the early 1900s it along with the sextant, spyglass, maneuvering board, parallel motion protractor and other navigation tools were part of the standard gear for the navigation officer aboard US warships.

During World War II the Mark 5 version was developed to function more like a sextant, with a single pivot arm replacing the linear screw worm drive which set the height of the object. The primary benefit of this development was that multiple objects of differing heights could be measured much faster since it removed the slow moving worm drive, which would need to be adjusted for each object height before a sight was taken with a much faster adjustable arc arm to set the object's height.

Today it is still used aboard US Navy warships at times when using active radar is inadvisable.

== See also ==
- Rangefinder
- Stadiametric rangefinding
