= Set and drift =

Influence of current velocity on the course of a vessel

The term “set and drift” is used to describe external forces that affect a boat and keep it from following an intended course. To understand and calculate set and drift, one needs to first understand currents. Ocean currents are the horizontal movements of water from one location to another. The movement of water is impacted by: meteorological effects, wind, temperature differences, gravity, and on occasion earthquakes. Set is the current's direction, expressed in true degrees. Drift is the current's speed, which is usually measured in knots. “Leeway” refers to the amount of sidewards translation of a vessel drifting off of or away from the intended course of travel (with no correction or compensation by altering the heading of the vessel such as pointing her into the wind.)

Ignoring set and drift can cause a mariner to get off their desired course, sometimes by hundreds of miles. A mariner needs to be able to steer the ship and compensate for the effects of set and drift upon their vessel while underway. The actual course a vessel travels is referred to as the course over the ground. The current of the ocean alters this course whether pushing it away from its desired course or in the same direction. The vessel's speed through the water is referred to as the boatspeed and the current can affect how fast or slow the vessel moves over the ground.

== How to Calculate ==
In order to utilize set and drift in navigation, navigators must first set the course using Dead Reckoning.

A Dead Reckoning, DR, is calculated by using a previously determined position on a chart, and advancing that position based on known or estimated speed over a set amount of time. This can be calculated by using the formula Speed = Distance ÷ Time.

Once an advance position has been plotted, then set and drift can be factored in. If there is a known set and drift, then the corrections can be applied to the Dead Reckoning position to then get an Estimated Position on a chart.

The Course Made Good is the direction in which a ship or vessel has traveled with the effects of current, wind, and helmsmanship. If a current is flowing in the same direction as the ships heading, then the Course Made Good remains the same, but the current speed and ship speed are added together. If the speeds are in opposite directions, then the smaller speed is subtracted from the larger speed. If a vessel runs directly against a current or directly with a current, the speed of the vessel and speed of the current can be added or subtracted from each other. Such as, a vessel has a speed of 8 knots through the water and the vessel is traveling with the current, which is at 2 knots, then the speed over ground is 8+2 and the vessel's true speed is 10 knots.

Set and Drift can be calculated by using a vector diagram and can be drawn and measured on a chart, maneuvering board or even a plain piece of paper.

== Example Calculation ==
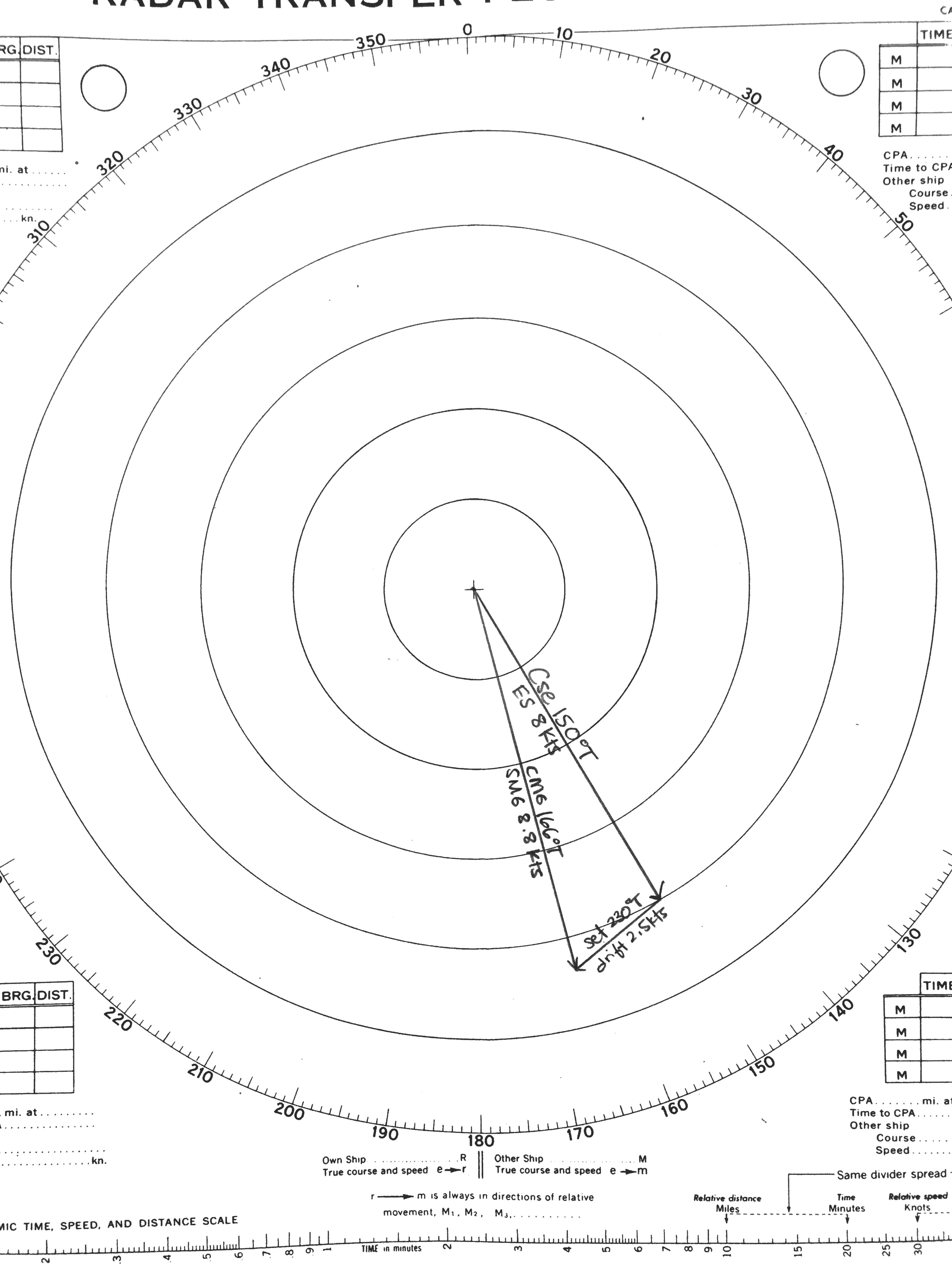
Set and Drift Example

You are underway on course 150 degrees true at 8 knots. Your vessel is making good a course of 166 degrees true and a speed made good of 8.8 knots. What is your set and drift?

- Step 1. Plot out course of 150 degrees true on Radar Plotting Sheet
- Step 2. Measure length of course by using speed of 8 knots and converting into nautical miles via the time, speed, and distance scale
- Step 3. Plot the length of speed on Radar Plotting sheet
- Step 4. Plot out desired course of 166 degrees true on Radar Plotting Sheet
- Step 5. Measure length of course by using speed of 8.8 knots and converting into nautical miles via the time, speed, and distance scale
- Step 6. Connect the two ends of the vectors from the current course to the course made good. Thus creating your set and drift vector
- Step 7. Using the navigational triangle, place on set and drift vector. Then drag to center crosshairs keeping the same angle and find the degrees on the outer circle
- Step 8. Measure the length of the set and drift vector with the compass. Convert from nautical miles into knots using the time, speed, and distance scale.
- Step 9. Your set is 230 degrees true at a drift of 2.5 knots

== Tools used to calculate ==
To use Navigation Triangles, a navigator need two of them to be able to navigate correctly. Navigation Triangles can be used to find Lines of Positions, Dead Reckoning, ranges, Estimated Positions, Running Fixes and so on. They are also used to connect all the types of fixes to be able to determine a course.

Dividers can be used for the measurement of lengths of lines on a chart and approximating the lengths of non-linear lines on a chart. Dividers can also be turned into a compass by replacing the metal leg of the divider with a piece of lead. A compass can measure and draw arc and circles on charts and maneuvering boards.
