= Course (navigation) =

Cardinal direction for steering

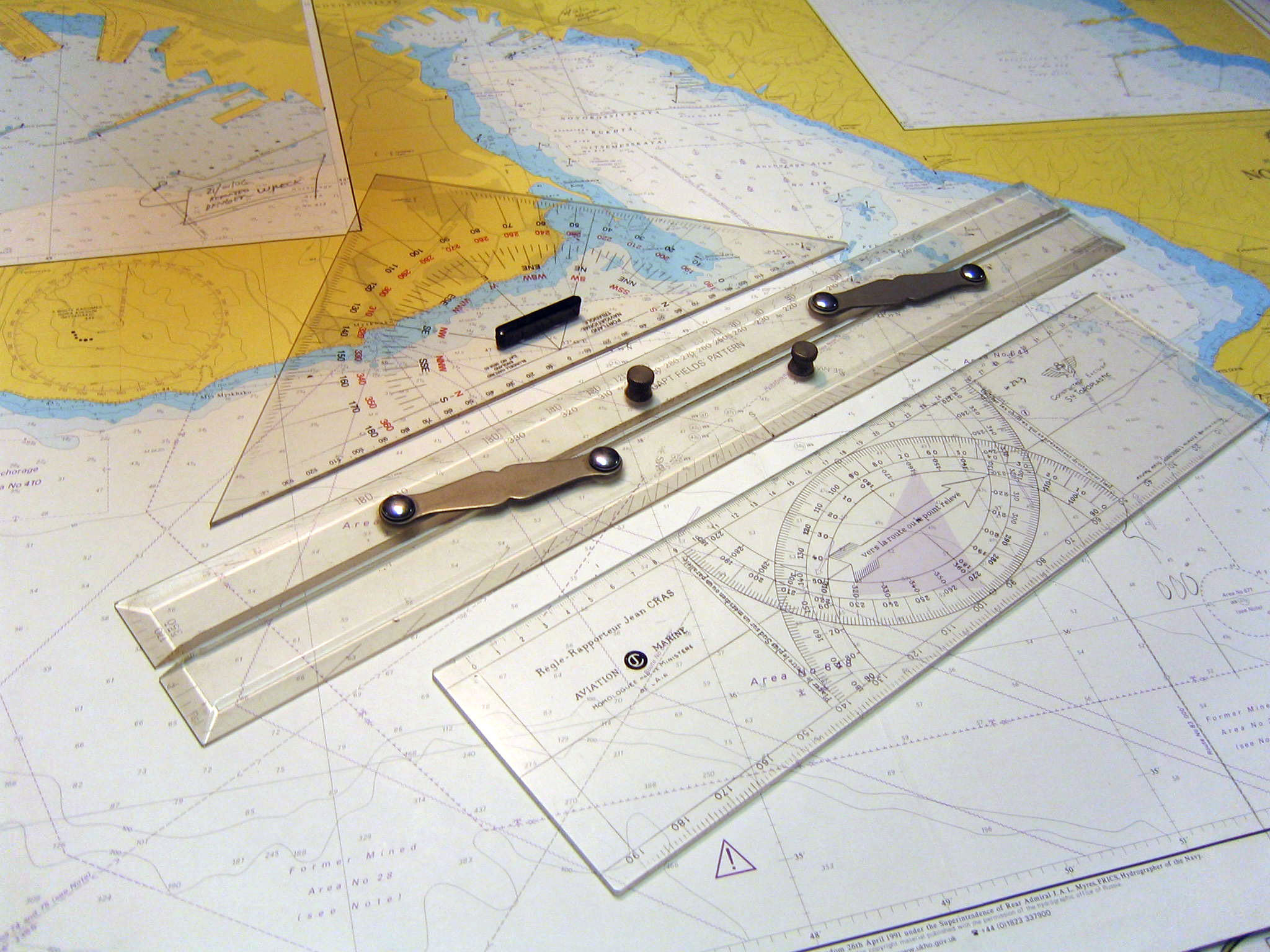
Instruments used to plot a course on a nautical chart.

In navigation, the course of a watercraft or aircraft is the cardinal direction in which the craft is to be steered. The course is to be distinguished from the heading, which is the direction where the watercraft's bow or the aircraft's nose is pointed. The path that a vessel follows is called a track or, in the case of aircraft, ground track (also known as course made good or course over the ground). The intended track is a route.

== Discussion ==
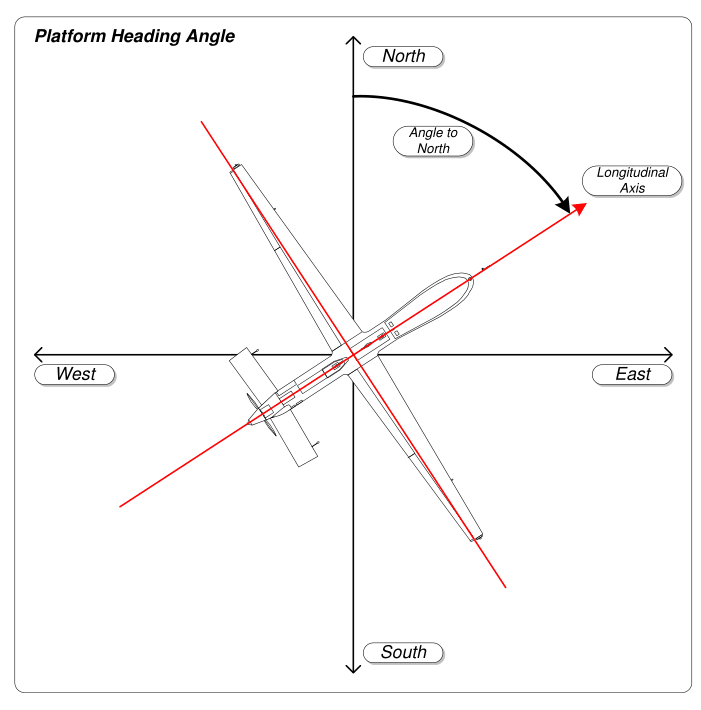
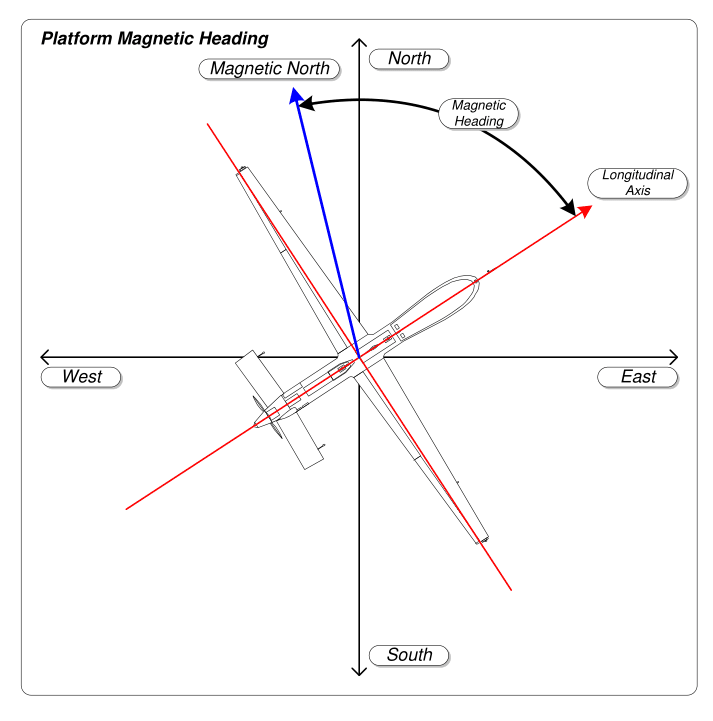
True heading (left) and magnetic heading (right)

For ships and aircraft, routes are typically straight-line segments between waypoints. A navigator determines the bearing (the compass direction from the craft's current position) of the next waypoint. Because water currents or wind can cause a craft to drift off course, a navigator sets a course to steer that compensates for drift. The helmsman or pilot points the craft on a heading that corresponds to the course to steer. If the predicted drift is correct, then the craft's track will correspond to the planned course to the next waypoint. Course directions are specified in degrees from north, either true or magnetic. In aviation, north is usually expressed as 360°. Navigators used ordinal directions, instead of compass degrees, e.g. "northeast" instead of 45° until the mid-20th century when the use of degrees became prevalent.

Heading and track (A to B) 1 – True North 2 – Heading, the direction the vessel is "pointing towards" 3 – Magnetic north, which differs from true north by the magnetic variation. 4 – Compass north, including a two-part error; the magnetic variation (6) and the ship's own magnetic field (5) 5 – Magnetic deviation, caused by vessel's magnetic field. 6 – Magnetic variation, caused by variations in Earth's magnetic field. 7 – Compass heading or compass course, before correction for magnetic deviation or magnetic variation. 8 – Magnetic heading, the compass heading corrected for magnetic deviation but not magnetic variation; thus, the heading reliative to magnetic north. 9, 10 – Effects of crosswind and tidal current, causing the vessel's track to differ from its heading. A, B – Vessel's track.

== See also ==
- Acronyms and abbreviations in avionics
- Glossary of navigation terms
- Bearing (navigation) – Angle between two objects
- Breton plotter – Navigational instrument
- E6-B flight computer – Circular slide rule used in aviation
- Great circle – Spherical geometry analog of a straight line
- Ground track – Path on the surface of the Earth or another body directly below an aircraft or satellite
- Navigation – Process of monitoring and controlling the movement of a craft or vehicle
- Navigation room – Room or platform from which a ship can be commanded
- Rhumb line – Arc crossing all meridians of longitude at the same angle
