= Maneuvering board =

Navigational aid

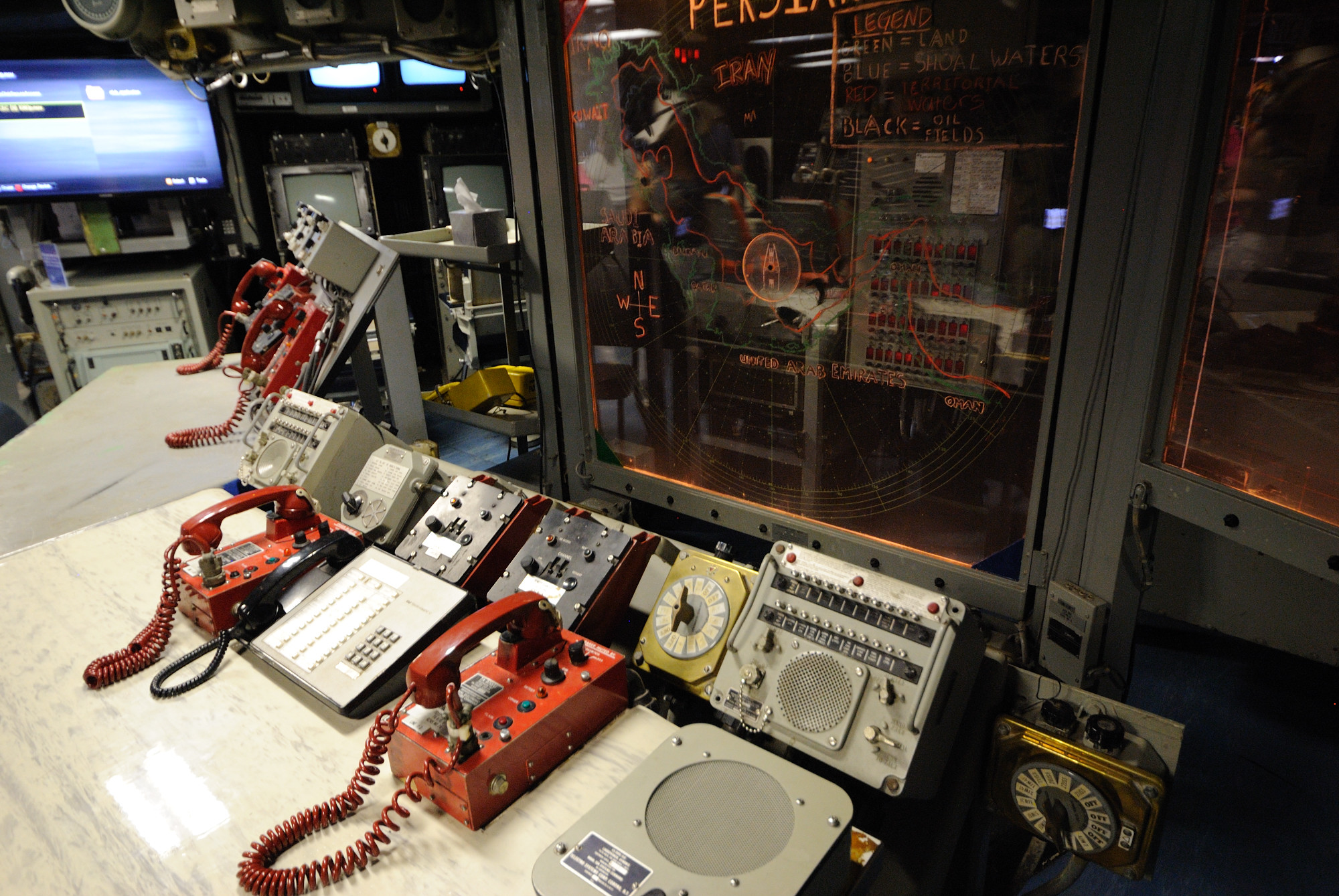
This large, edge-lighted plexiglass combat information center maneuvering board for grease pencils has been used for display of other information. Most maneuvering boards are printed on pads of paper.

A maneuvering board is an aid to navigation. It is typically a writing surface with a pre-printed compass rose of polar coordinates about a central point, often including adjacent linear scales, and sometimes a time/speed/distance nomogram. With the aid of a marking device, dividers, and parallel rulers, the maneuvering board provides a template for graphical solution of relative motion problems.

== History ==
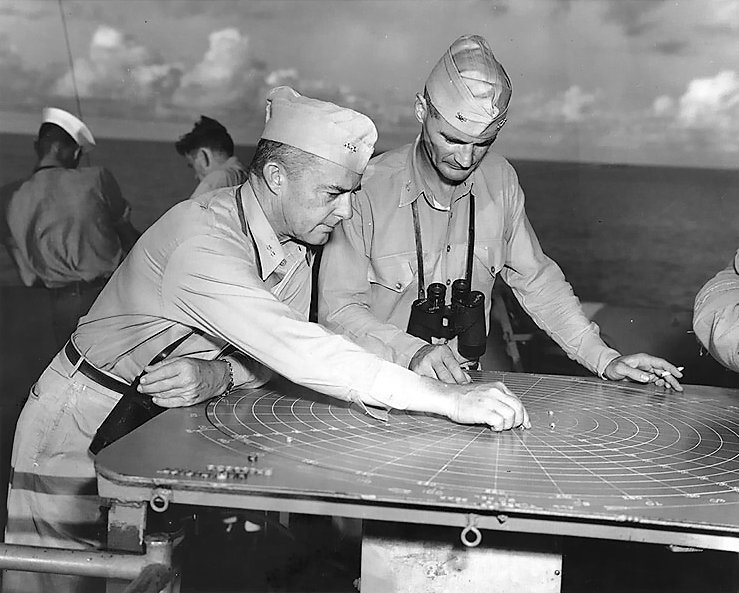
Working with a maneuvering board on USS Montpelier (CL-57), during operations in the Solomon Islands, 23 December 1943.

Prior to widespread availability of pocket calculators and computers, maneuvering boards were used aboard ships and aircraft to provide rapid solutions to commonly encountered relative motion problems. Availability of RADAR distance information improved solutions obtained with stadimeter estimates. When operating in a formation of ships, navigation personnel were encouraged to add the relative positions of the other ships in formation to their maneuvering boards to clarify station changing problems when orders were received.

== Applications ==
Where observation of fixed points is available, the maneuvering board can be used to estimate wind and/or current and course corrections required to reach a desired destination. Ships can use maneuvering boards to estimate true wind speed and direction from course, speed, and observed wind speed and direction. When true wind is known, the maneuvering board can be used to determine the required ship course and speed for a desired relative wind to launch or recover aircraft. Ships most frequently used maneuvering boards to estimate the course and speed of other ships and determine the closest point of approach. Naval ships used such information to avoid or intercept other ships and to provide intercept courses for straight-running torpedoes. Ships operating together used maneuvering boards to determine course and speed required to change station within formation.
