= Flight computer =

Circular slide rule used in aviation

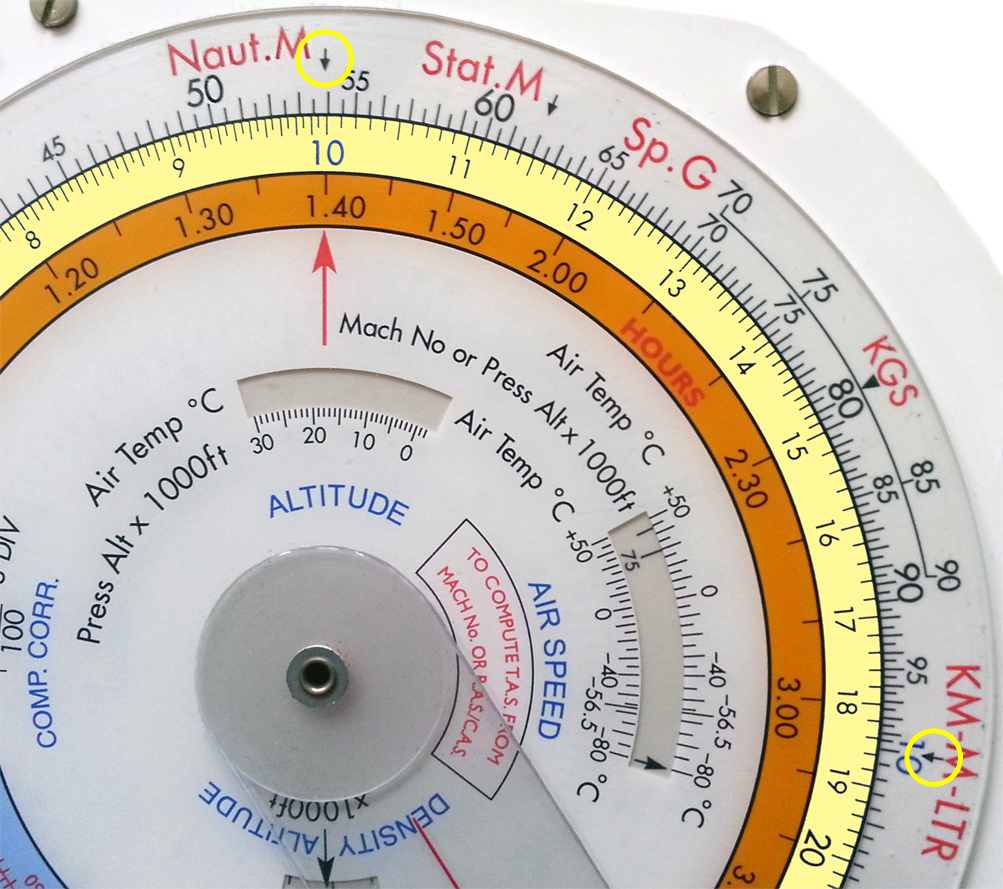
nm-km conversion on a CRP-5 flight computer

A flight computer is a form of slide rule used in aviation, is and one of very few analog computers in widespread use in the 21st century. Sometimes it is called by the make or model name like E6-B, CR, CRP-1, or by colloquial terms such as the Whizz wheel, or in German, as the Dreieckrechner.

They are mostly used in flight training, but many professional pilots still carry and use flight computers. They are used during flight planning (on the ground before takeoff) to aid in calculating fuel burn, wind correction, time en-route, and other items. In the air, the flight computer can be used to calculate ground speed, estimated fuel burn and updated estimated time of arrival. The back is designed for wind correction calculations, i.e., determining how much the wind is affecting one's speed and course.

== Specific Usage ==
=== Finding distance over time ===
Take the number 60 on the inner circle (which usually has an arrow, and sometimes says rate on it). 60 is used in reference to the number of minutes in an hour. By placing the 60 on the intended airspeed (in knots), on the outer ring the pilot can find how far the aircraft will travel in any given number of minutes. The inner ring will indicate minutes traveled, and the distance traveled will be directly above it on the outer ring. This can also be done backwards to find the amount of time the aircraft will take to travel a given number of nautical miles.

=== Finding wind components ===
The main body of the flight computer will comprise of the wind component grid, which is used to find how much crosswind the aircraft will actually have to correct for at all stages of flight.

The crosswind component is the amount of crosswind in knots that is being applied to the airframe, and can be less than the actual speed of the wind due to the angle at which the aircraft meets the wind.

The pilot will plot the wind direction and strength on the crisscross grid, and manipulate the wheel and grid to account for the actual direction of flight of the aircraft, along with the intended speed to be flown in knots. The plotted point will then have been manipulated as well, and will have shifted to show the actual wind component acting on the aircraft, and how it affects speed and direction of flight.

=== Conversions ===
The front of the flight computer can also be used to convert units of measurement. This includes temperature (Fahrenheit to Celsius), distance (Nautical Miles to Statute Miles, Metric Meters, and Feet), and volume (Liters to Imperial Gallons and U.S. Gallons).

== Digital and software-based flight computers ==
The basic functions of mechanical flight computers are now widely implemented in electronic form. Dedicated hand-held "electronic E6B" devices and software-based flight computers running on personal computers, tablets and smartphones can perform wind calculations, fuel planning, time–distance–speed problems and density-altitude calculations, as well as additional tasks such as runway performance checks and unit conversions. Many pilot training syllabi still require students to understand the use of the mechanical E6B as a backup, but allow or encourage the use of digital flight computers for routine planning and in-flight calculations.

== Gallery ==
Computer; Dead Reckoning Type AN-5835-1

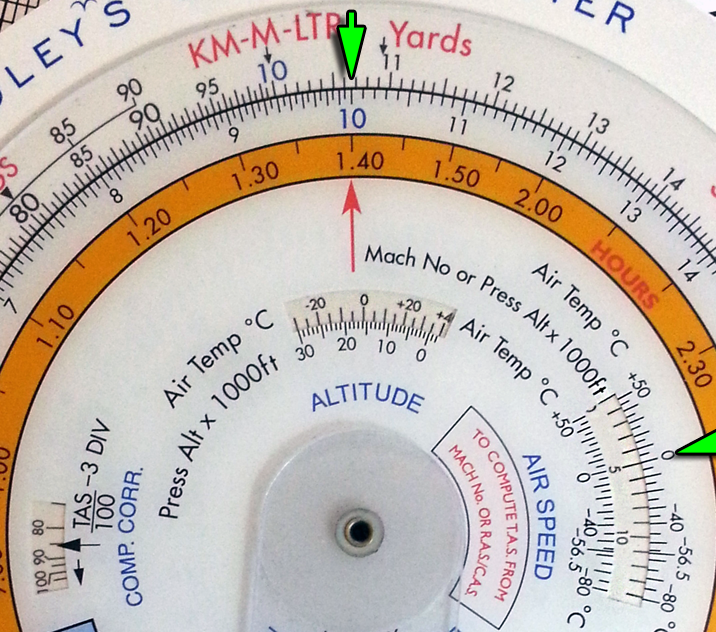
CAS-TAS conversion

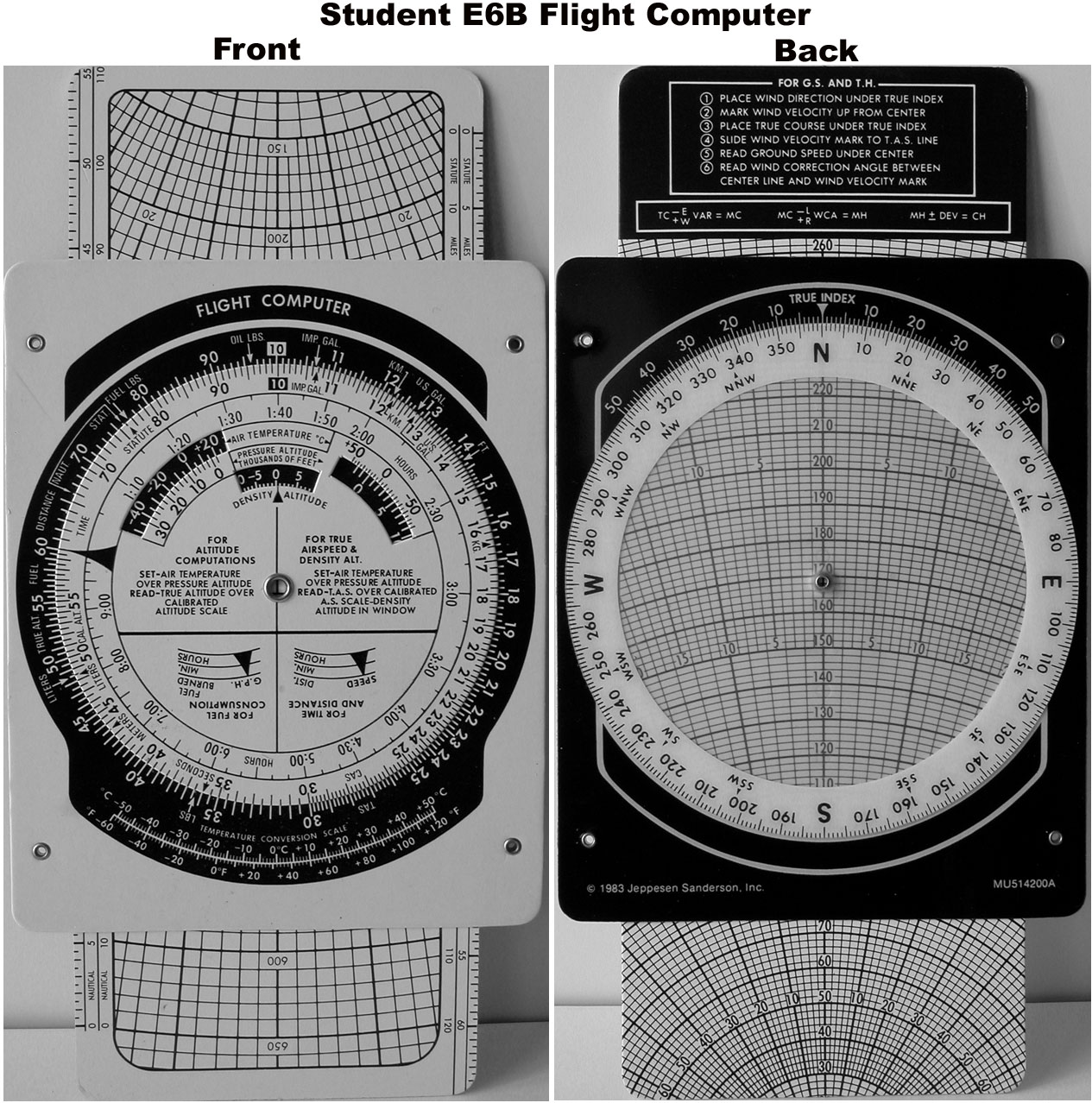
An E6B flight computer commonly used by student pilots.

== See also ==
- Index of aviation articles
- Wind triangle
- Dead reckoning
- Flight Management Computer
