= E6-B flight computer =

Circular slide rule used in aviation

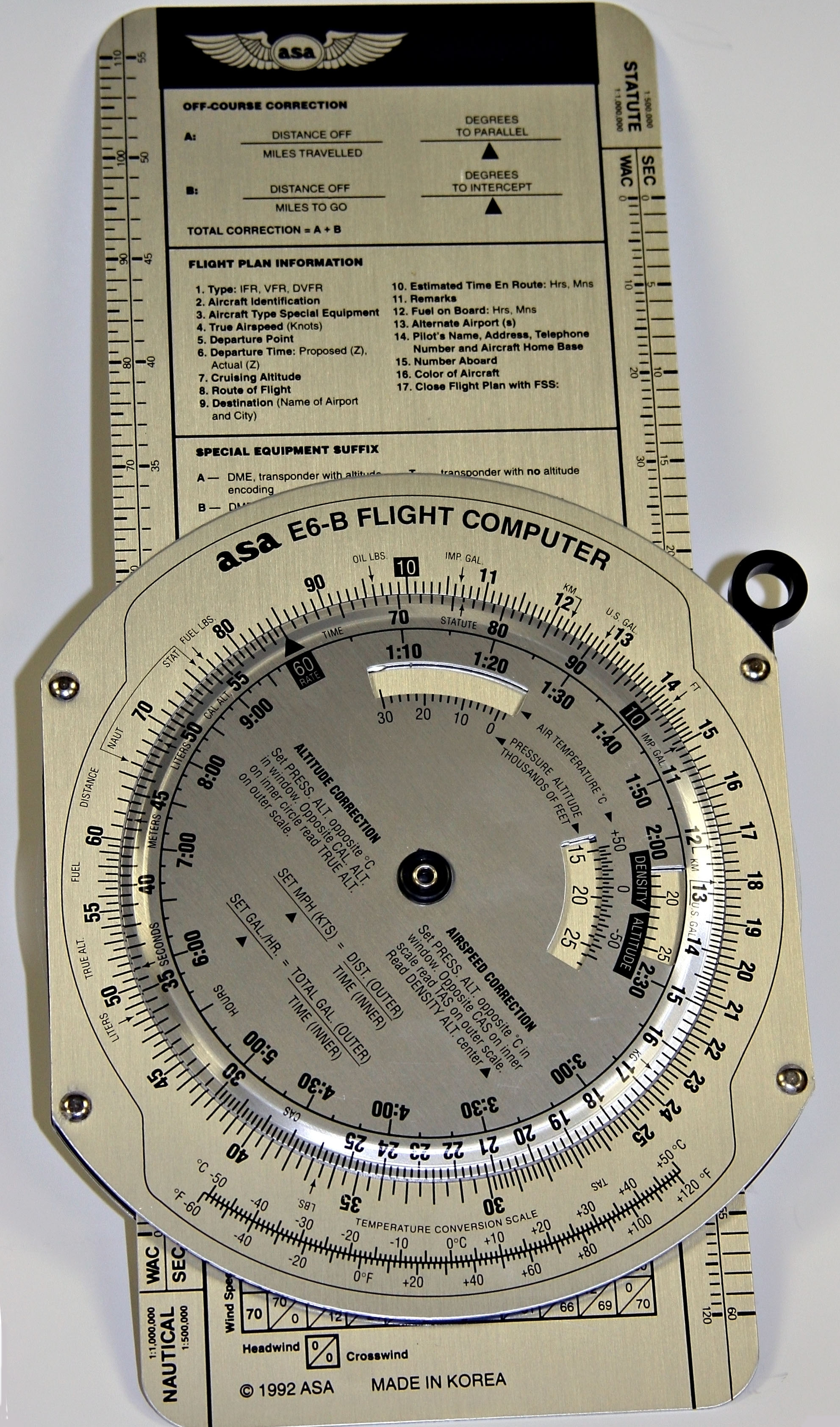
The front of a metal E6-B

The E6-B flight computer is a form of circular slide rule used in aviation. It is an analog calculating device still being used in the 21st century.

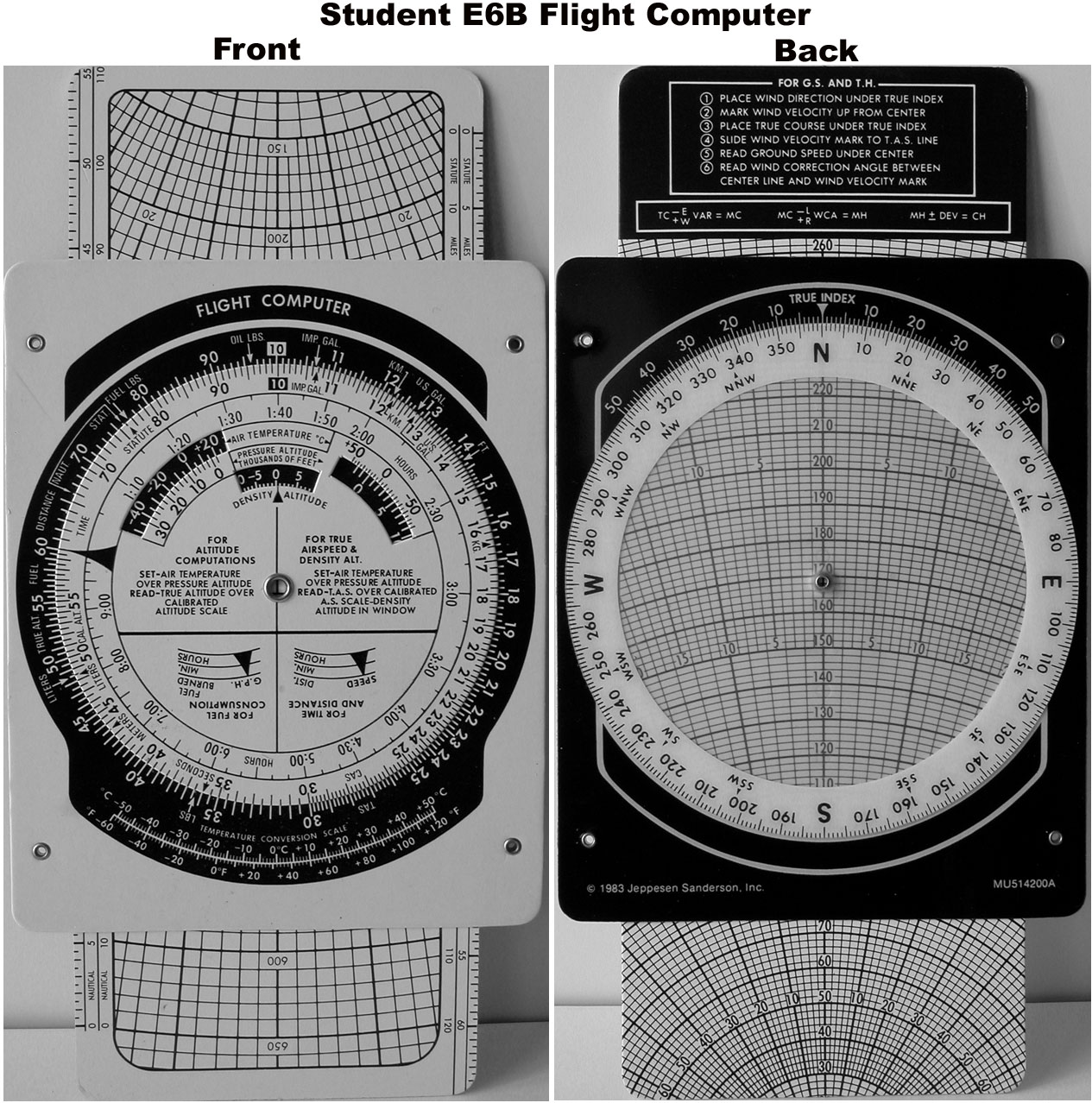
An E6-B flight computer commonly used by student pilots.

They are mostly used in flight training, because these flight computers have been replaced with electronic planning tools or software and websites that make these calculations for the pilots. These flight computers are used during flight planning (on the ground before takeoff) to aid in calculating fuel burn, wind correction, time en route, and other items. In the air, the flight computer can be used to calculate ground speed, estimated fuel burn and updated estimated time of arrival. The back is designed for wind vector solutions, i.e., determining how much the wind is affecting one's speed and course. They are frequently referred to by the nickname "whiz wheel".

== Construction ==
Flight computers are usually made out of aluminum, plastic or cardboard, or combinations of these materials. One side is used for wind triangle calculations using a rotating scale and a sliding panel. The other side is a circular slide rule. Extra marks and windows facilitate calculations specifically needed in aviation.

Electronic versions are also produced, resembling calculators, rather than manual slide rules. Aviation remains one of the few places that the slide rule is still in widespread use. Manual E6-Bs/CRP-1s remain popular with some users and in some environments rather than the electronic ones because they are lighter, smaller, less prone to break, easy to use one-handed, quicker and do not require electrical power.

In flight training for a private pilot or instrument rating, mechanical flight computers are still often used to teach the fundamental computations. This is in part also due to the complex nature of some trigonometric calculations which would be comparably difficult to perform on a conventional scientific calculator. The graphic nature of the flight computer also helps in catching many errors which in part explains their continued popularity. The ease of use of electronic calculators means typical flight training literature does not cover the use of calculators or computers at all. In the ground exams for numerous pilot ratings, programmable calculators or calculators containing flight planning software are permitted to be used.

Many airspeed indicator (ASI) instruments have a movable ring built into the face of the instrument that is essentially a subset of the flight computer. Just like on the flight computer, the ring is aligned with the air temperature and the pressure altitude, allowing the true airspeed (TAS) to be read at the needle.

In addition, computer programs emulating the flight computer functions are also available, both for computers and smartphones.

== Calculations ==
Instructions for ratio calculations and wind problems are printed on either side of the computer for reference and are also found in a booklet sold with the computer. Also, many computers have Fahrenheit to Celsius conversion charts and various reference tables.

The front side of the flight computer is a logarithmic slide rule that performs multiplication and division. Throughout the wheel, unit names are marked (such as gallons, miles, kilometers, pounds, minutes, seconds, etc.) at locations that correspond to the constants that are used when going from one unit to another in various calculations. Once the wheel is positioned to represent a certain fixed ratio (for example, pounds of fuel per hour), the rest of the wheel can be consulted to utilize that same ratio in a problem (for example, how many pounds of fuel for a 2.5-hour cruise?) This is one area where the E6-B and CRP-1 are different. Since the CRP-1s are made for the UK market, they can be used to perform the added conversions of Imperial to Metric units.

The wheel on the back of the calculator is used for calculating the effects of wind on cruise flight. A typical calculation done by this wheel answers the question: "If I want to fly on course A at a speed of B, but I encounter wind coming from direction WD at a speed of WV, then how many degrees must I adjust my heading, and what will my ground speed be?" This part of the calculator consists of a rotatable semi-transparent wheel with a hole in the middle, and a slide on which a grid is printed, that moves up and down underneath the wheel. The grid is visible through the transparent part of the wheel.

To solve this problem with a flight computer, first the wheel is turned so the wind direction (WD) is at the top of the wheel. Then a pencil mark is made just below the hole, at a distance representing the wind speed (WV) away from the hole. After the mark is made, the wheel is turned so that the course (A) is now selected at the top of the wheel. The ruler then is slid so that the pencil mark is aligned with the true airspeed (B) seen through the transparent part of the wheel. The wind correction angle is determined by matching how far right or left the pencil mark is from the hole, to the wind correction angle portion of the slide's grid. The true ground speed is determined by matching the center hole to the speed portion of the grid.

The mathematical formulas that equate to the results of the flight computer wind calculator follow. In the formulas:

- d is desired course (angle);
- a is heading (angle);
- w is wind direction (angle);
- V_{g} is ground speed;
- V_{a} is true airspeed;
- V_{w} is wind speed; and
- π is the circle constant.

V_{g}, V_{a}, and V_{w} are in consistent units of speed (typically knots; also miles per hour or kilometers per hour).

=== Wind correction angle ===
The wind correction angle formula is:
$$\Delta a = \begin{cases}
\sin^{-1}\left(\frac {V_\mathrm{w}}{V_\mathrm{a}}\sin(w-d)\right), & \text{in radians;} \\
\frac{180^\circ}{\pi}\sin^{-1}\left(\frac{V_\mathrm{w}}{V_\mathrm{a}}\sin\left(\frac{\pi}{180^\circ}(w-d)\right)\right), & \text{in degrees.}
\end{cases}$$

=== True ground speed ===
The true ground speed formula is:
$$V_\mathrm{g} =
\begin{cases}
\sqrt{V_\mathrm{a}^2+V_\mathrm{w}^2-2V_\mathrm{a}V_\mathrm{w}\cos(d - w+\Delta a)}, & \text{in degrees;} \\
\sqrt{V_\mathrm{a}^2 + V_\mathrm{w}^2 - 2V_\mathrm{a}V_\mathrm{w}\cos\left(\frac{\pi}{180^\circ}(d-w+\Delta a)\right)} & \text{in radians.}
\end{cases}$$

== Modern-day E6-Bs ==
Although digital E6-Bs are faster to learn initially, many flight schools still require their students to learn on mechanical E6-Bs,[1] and for FAA pilot written exams and checkrides pilots are encouraged to bring their mechanical E6-Bs with them for necessary calculations but may use electronic ones as well.

=== Electronic and software variants ===
From the late twentieth century, manufacturers introduced electronic E6B devices that reproduce the standard wind and performance calculations using microprocessors and digital displays. More recently, E6B functionality has been incorporated into flight-planning software and mobile applications, allowing pilots to perform the same calculations on personal computers, tablets and smartphones. Despite the availability of these tools, mechanical E6Bs remain in widespread use, particularly in primary training and as a non-electronic backup in the cockpit.

== History ==
Closeup photo of a metal E6-B

The device's original name is E-6B, but is often abbreviated as E6B, or hyphenated as E6-B for commercial purposes.

The E-6B was developed in the United States by Naval Lt. Philip Dalton (1903–1941) in the late 1930s. The name comes from its original part number for the U.S Army Air Corps, before its reorganization in June 1941.

Philip Dalton was a Cornell University graduate who joined the United States Army as an artillery officer, but soon resigned and became a Naval Reserve pilot from 1931 until he died in a plane crash with a student practicing spins. He, with P. V. H. Weems, invented, patented and marketed a series of flight computers.

Dalton's first popular computer was his 1933 Model B, the circular slide rule with true airspeed (TAS) and altitude corrections pilots know so well. In 1936 he put a double-drift diagram on its reverse to create what the U.S. Army Air Corps (USAAC) designated as the E-1, E-1A and E-1B.

A couple of years later he invented the Mark VII, again using his Model B slide rule as a focal point. It was hugely popular with both the military and the airlines. Fred Noonan, Amelia Earhart's navigator on her attempted circling of the globe, used one on their last flight. Dalton felt that it was a rushed design, and wanted to create something more accurate, easier to use, and able to handle higher flight speeds.

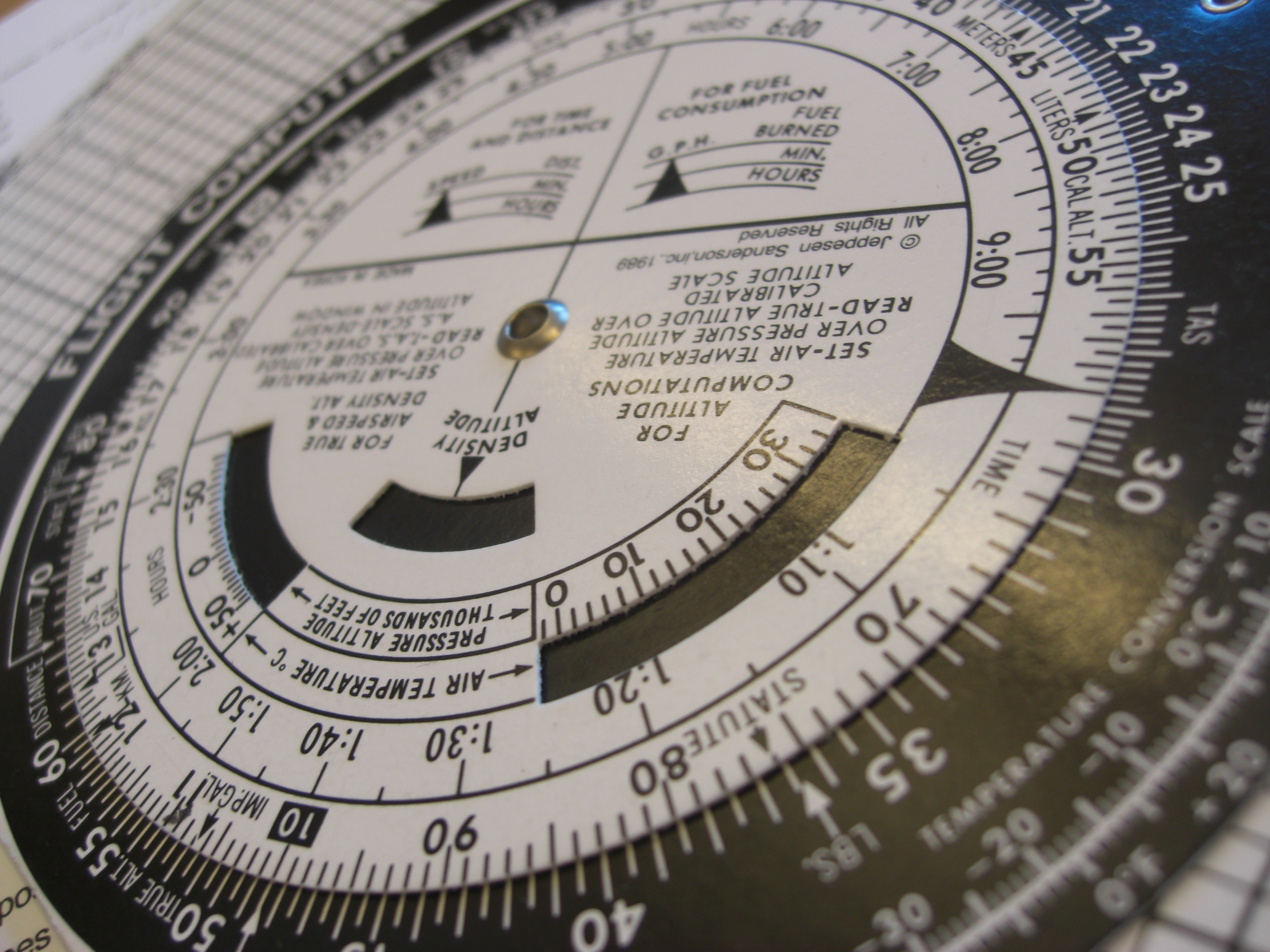
Closeup photo of a cardboard E6B

So he came up with his now famous wind arc slide, but printed on an endless cloth belt moved inside a square box by a knob. He applied for a patent in 1936 (granted in 1937 as 2,097,116). This was for the Model C, D and G computers widely used in World War II by the British Commonwealth (as the "Dalton Dead Reckoning Computer"), the U.S. Navy, copied by the Japanese, and improved on by the Germans, through Siegfried Knemeyer's invention of the disc-type Dreieckrechner device, somewhat similar to the eventual E6-B's backside compass rose dial in general appearance, but having the compass rose on the front instead for real-time calculations of the wind triangle at any time while in flight. These are commonly available on collectible auction web sites.

The U.S. Army Air Corps decided the endless belt computer cost too much to manufacture, so later in 1937 Dalton morphed it to a simple, rigid, flat wind slide, with his old Model B circular slide rule included on the reverse. He called this prototype his Model H; the Army called it the E-6A.

In 1938 the Army wrote formal specifications, and had him make a few changes, which Weems called the Model J. The changes included moving the "10" mark to the top instead of the original "60". This "E-6B" was introduced to the Army in 1940, but it took Pearl Harbor for the Army Air Forces (as the former "Army Air Corps" was renamed on June 20, 1941) to place a large order. Over 400,000 E-6Bs were manufactured during World War II, mostly of a plastic that glows under black light (cockpits were illuminated this way at night).

The base name "E-6" was fairly arbitrary, as there were no standards for stock numbering at the time. For example, other USAAC computers of that time were the C-2, D-2, D-4, E-1 and G-1, and flight pants became E-1s as well. Most likely they chose "E" because Dalton's previously combined time and wind computer had been the E-1. The "B" simply meant it was the production model.

The designation "E-6B" was officially marked on the device only for a couple of years. By 1943 the Army and Navy changed the marking to their joint standard, the AN-C-74 (Army/Navy Computer 74). A year or so later it was changed to AN-5835, and then to AN-5834 (1948). The USAF called later updates the MB-4 (1953) and the CPU-26 (1958), but navigators and most instruction manuals continued using the original E-6B name. Many just called it the "Dalton Dead Reckoning Computer", one of its original markings.

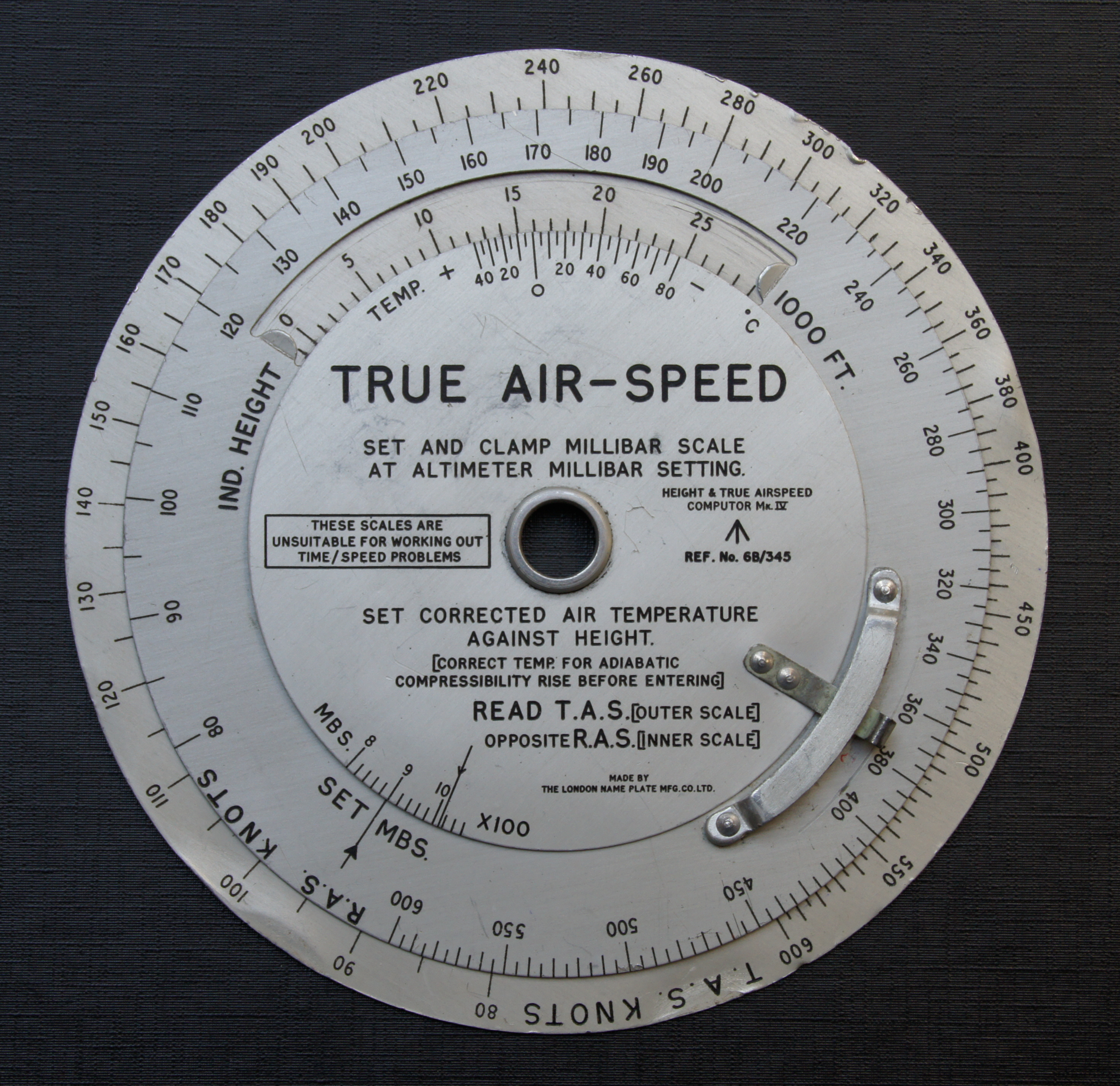
Frontside of the military 6B/345

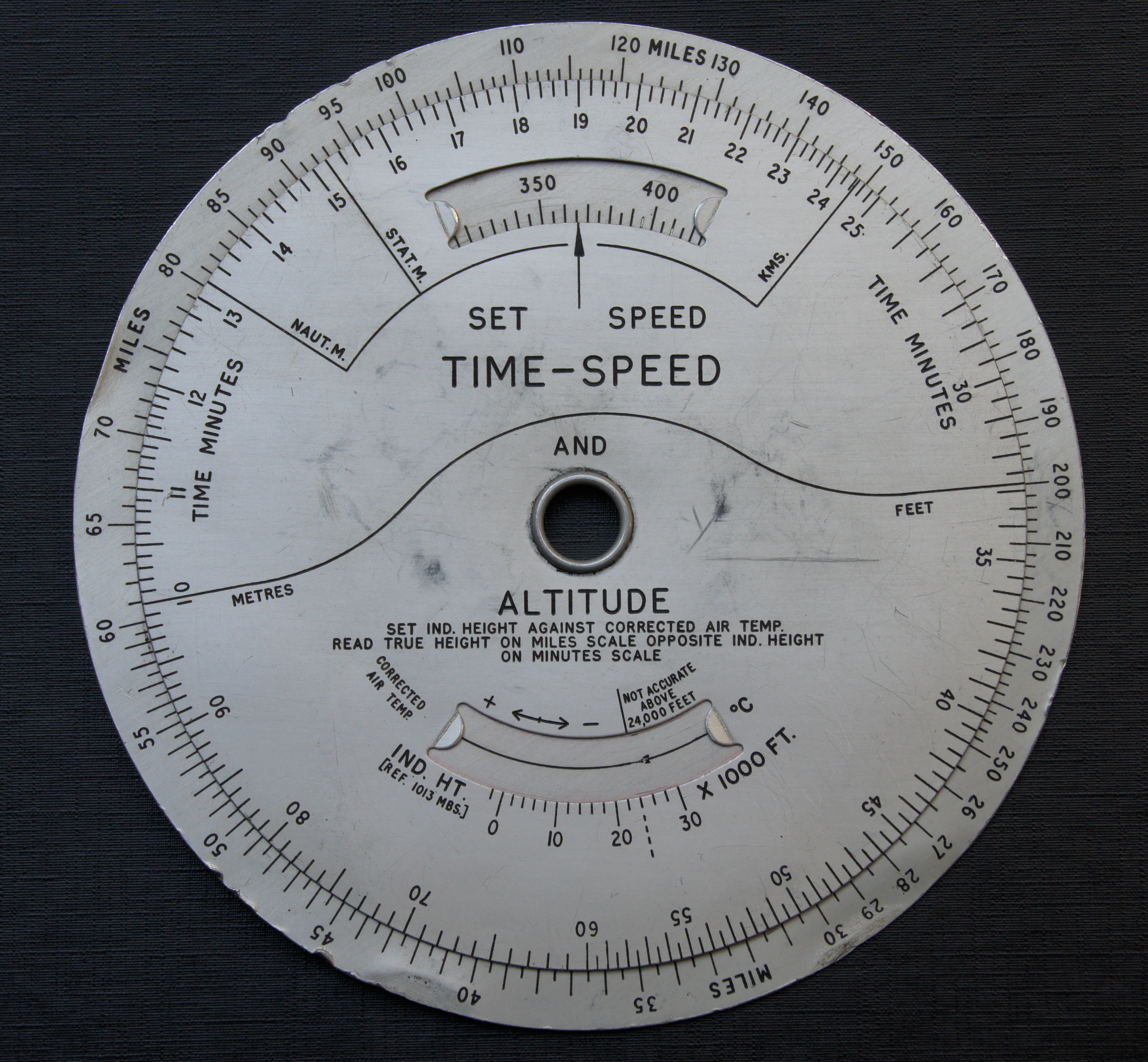
Backside of the military 6B/345

After Dalton's death, Weems updated the E-6B and tried calling it the E-6C, E-10, and so forth, but finally fell back on the original name, which was so well known by 50,000 World War II Army Air Force navigator veterans. After the patent ran out, many manufacturers made copies, sometimes using a marketing name of "E6-B" (note the moved hyphen). An aluminium version was made by the London Name Plate Mfg. Co. Ltd. of London and Brighton and was marked "Computer Dead Reckoning Mk. 4A Ref. No. 6B/2645" followed by the arrowhead of UK military stores.

During World War II and into the early 1950s, The London Name Plate Mfg. Co. Ltd. produced a "Height & True Airspeed Computer Mk. IV" with the model reference "6B/345". The tool provided for calculation of the True Air Speed on the front side and Time-Speed calculations in relation to the altitude on the backside. They were still in use throughout the 1960s and 1970s in several European Air Forces, such as the German Air Force, until modern avionics made them obsolete.

== See also ==
- Index of aviation articles
- Siegfried Knemeyer, inventor of the similar, contemporary Dreieckrechner flight calculator
- Wind triangle
