= Charlier (surname) =

Charlier is a surname. Notable people with the surname include:

- Adélaïde Charlier (born 2000), Belgian climate activist
- Anna Charlier, fiancée of North pole explorer Nils Strindberg
- Carl Charlier (1862–1934), Swedish astronomer
- Cédric Charlier, Belgian field hockey player
- Guillaume Charlier (1854–1925), Belgian sculptor
- Henri Charlier (1883–1975), French painter and sculptor
- Jean-Joseph Charlier (1794–1886), Belgian artisan and revolutionary
- Jean-Michel Charlier (1924–1989), Belgian scriptwriter and comic book author
- Joseph Charlier (1816–1896), Belgian self-described jurist, writer, accountant and merchant
- Karine Charlier (born 1977), French gymnast
- Léon Charlier, Belgian wrestler
- Léopold Charlier (1867–1936), Belgian violinist and music teacher
- Louis-Joseph Charlier (1754–1797), French politician
- Mariano Charlier (born 1974), Argentine football manager
- Michel Charlier (born 1949), French cyclist
- Olivier Charlier (born 1961), French violinist
- Paul Charlier, Australian composer and sound designer
- Philippe Charlier (born 1977), French coroner, forensic pathologist, and paleopathologist
- Roger Charlier (1921–2018), Belgian World War II resistance fighter, member of the prosecuting team at the Nuremberg trials and oceanographer
- Sébastien Charlier (born 1971), French diatonic harmonica player
- Suzanne Tassier-Charlier (1898–1956), Belgian historian, political activist, feminist and academic
- Théo Charlier (1868–1944), Belgian trumpeter, composer, and teacher
- Vladimir Cybil Charlier (born 1967), American visual artist

== See also ==
- Jean Charlier de Gerson (1363–1429), French scholar, educator, reformer and poet
- Charlier (disambiguation)
