= Charlier =

Charlier may refer to:

- Charlier (surname)
- Charlier (lunar crater) named after Carl Charlier
- Charlier (Martian crater) named after Carl Charlier
- Charlier Museum, an art museum in Brussels, Belgium
- Charlier polynomials introduced by Carl Charlier

== See also ==
- Charlier Cut, a method of cutting a deck of cards with one hand
