= Jean Dallaire =

Canadian painter (1916-1965)

- Jean Dallaire in 1956 when he was working for the National Film Board as an illustrator.
- Born: Jean-Philippe Dallaire; 9 June 1916; Hull, Quebec, Canada
- Died: 27 November 1965 (aged 49); Vence, Alpes-Maritimes, France
- Occupation: Painter
- Known for: Carnival scenes

Jean-Philippe Dallaire (9 June 1916 – 27 November 1965) was one of the leading artists working figuratively in the 1960s in Canada. He is known for his festive scenes peopled by macabre characters.

== Early years ==
Jean-Philippe Dallaire was born in Hull to a large working-class family. He started drawing when he was eleven years old. He studied at the École technique in Hull and at the Central Technical School in Toronto between 1932 and 1935. Dallaire then studied briefly in Boston.

In 1936 he set up his studio in the Dominican monastery in Ottawa and began his career painting religious subjects. That year, at the age of twenty, he painted a self-portrait that was later acquired from his estate by the National Gallery of Canada in 1972. In Ottawa, Dallaire become involved with Les Confrères artistes Le Caveau, working alongside Henri Masson. In 1938 Dallaire studied at the École des Beaux Arts in Montreal. In October 1938 the government of Quebec gave him a grant that allowed him to go to Paris and study at Ateliers d'Art Sacré and the studio of André Lhote. He also worked in his own studio in Montmartre. While in Paris he encountered the work of Pablo Picasso and the surrealists, such as Salvador Dalí.

During World War II (1939–1945), Dallaire and his father were placed in an internment camp after the German forces occupied Paris in 1940. Dallaire's wife was released after six months. He was held in the camp of Saint-Denis, near Paris, for four years. After being released he took a course in tapestry and apprenticed in tapestry-making in Aubusson under Jean Lurçat.

== Later career ==
Dallaire returned to Canada after the war and from 1945 to 1952 taught at the Ecole des Beaux-Arts in Quebec City. He worked for the National Film Board of Canada as a cartoonist for educational films in Ottawa from 1952 to 1956 and then in Montreal from 1956 to 1958. During this period he was also commissioned to create numerous murallevese. He was among the artists selected to decorate the interior of the Queen Elizabeth Hotel, owned by the Canadian National Railway, which opened in 1958. He contributed a wall hanging. Others were Marius Plamondon (stained glass mural), Claude Vermette (ceramic tiles), Julien Hébert (bronze elevator doors) and Albert Edward Cloutier (carved wooden panels).

In 1959 Dallaire moved to Vence in the south of France where he lived until his death in 1965.

The first retrospective of Dallaire's work was organized by the Musée d’art contemporain de Montréal and the Musée du Québec in 1968.

== Work ==
Dallaire was technically a virtuoso in both painting and drawing. He painted on cardboard, canvas board, linen or cotton canvas, chipboard and plywood. Despite his studies, Dallaire was largely self-taught and was highly original. He paid little attention to external trends, while his style constantly evolved as he matured. His early work included realistic portraits, which were followed by cubist and surrealist works. All his work is characterized by a practically unique perception. Although interested in abstraction, he was essentially representative. His best known works are his paintings of festivities populated by unreal charactersesoves, glimpses of a mysterious private world. Despite his cheerful palette, his artificial paradise is peopled by troubled characters affected by fear, madness and violence.

A critic has said, "Dallaire had a magical way of applying paint. His oils look like gouaches, the texture of the board, or canvas, visible under the fine layers of paint. As simple as the image may appear, it is in fact a symphony of colour and gesture, a painterlesblese tableau in the guise of a fairytale." In 1957 Dallaire said,

"One could say that I do not take life seriously. I always had a fondness for birds, little flags and the texture of fabrics. Perhaps it is a bit decorative, but so what." (Note: On pourrait croire que je ne prends pas la vie au sérieux… apparemment! J’ai toujours eu du goût pour les oiseaux, les petits drapeaux et encore pour la matière des tissus. C’est peut-être décoratif, mais, au fond qu’est-ce que ça peut faire?)

Dallaire's eclecticism and attachment to figurative art have tended to make critics marginalize his work. The first retrospective exhibition of his work was held in 1968 at the Musée d'art contemporain de Montréal and the Musée national des beaux-arts du Québec.
