= Marius Plamondon =

Canadian sculptor and stained glass artist

- The soprano Muriel Hall and her husband Marius Plamondon
- Born: 1914; Quebec City, Quebec, Canada
- Died: 1976 (aged 61–62)
- Occupations: Stained glass artist, teacher
- Known for: Windows in Saint Joseph's Oratory, Montreal

Marius Plamondon (1914–1976) was a Canadian sculptor and stained glass artist who made a significant contribution to the revival of the art of stained glass in Quebec during his lifetime. His most famous work is the set of ten stained glass windows he made for Saint Joseph's Oratory, Montreal.

== Early years ==
Marius Plamondon was born in 1914 in Quebec City, Quebec. He studied at the Quebec City École des beaux-arts. He spent time in Italy where he studied sculpture. In October 1938 he went to work with the sculptor Henri Charlier in France. He was also interested in the work of the sculptor Jean Lambert-Rucki and his use of the expressive distortions of African art.

== Career ==
Plamondon was part of the remarkable revival of the arts in Quebec in 1940–42, with Louis Guay and the painter Jean Paul Lemieux. He insisted that stained glass artists had to evolve new ways of expression to complement the new, simplified architecture of the time. Plamondon became professor and director of the Quebec School of Fine Arts. Plamondon made twenty windows for the chapel of the novitiate of the Clerics of Saint Viator, Joliette, described in a 1947 study by Maximilien Boucher. The novitiate had been built in 1939 following a design by architect René Charbonneau. Plamondon's magnificent windows help create an atmosphere of mystery and contemplation in the chapel, which has been called a modern version of the German church in Frielingsdorff. Plamondon also created statues for the chapel.

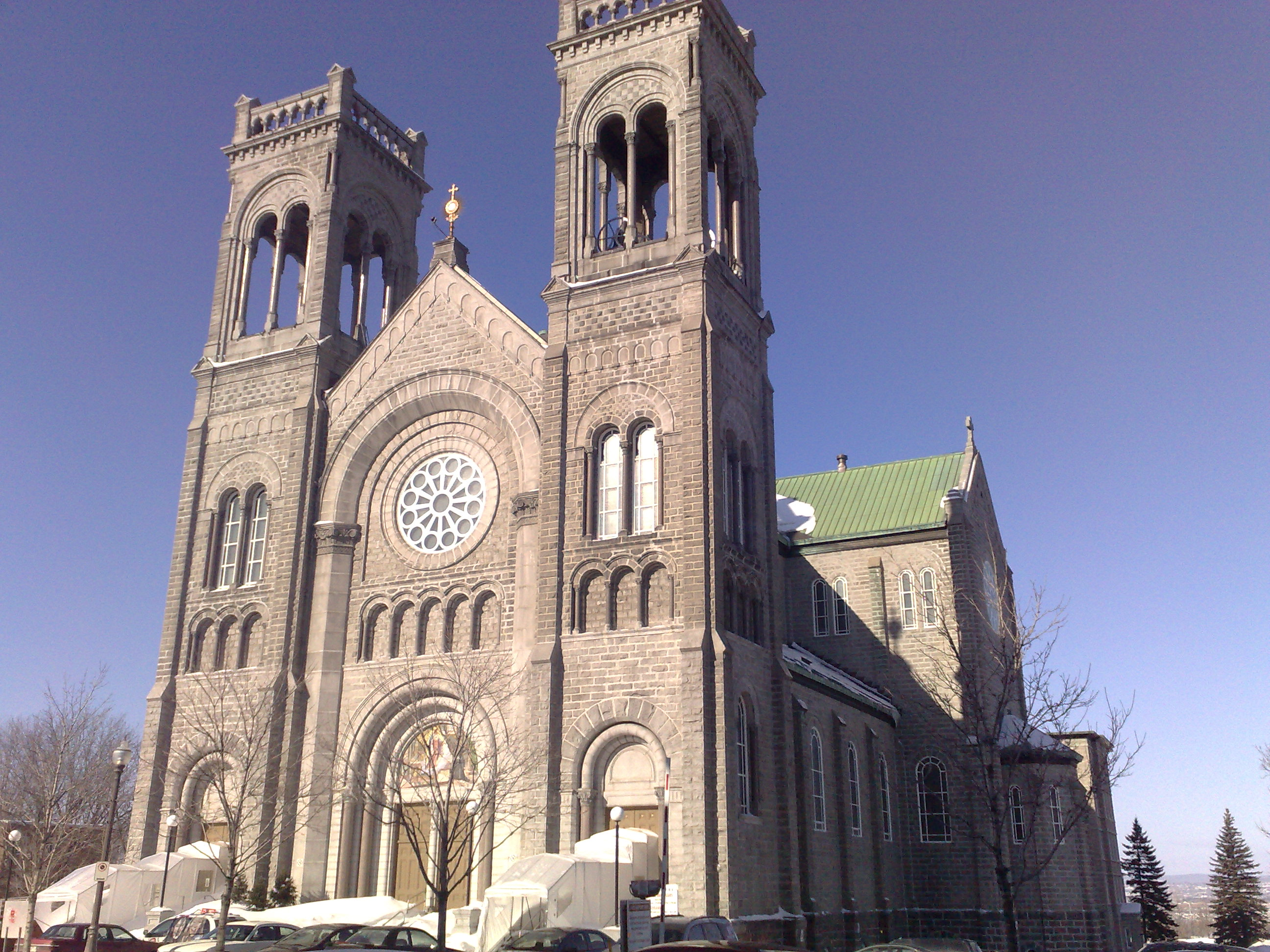
Église du Très-Saint-Sacrement, Québec. The church has stained glass windows by Plamondon

In 1951–52 Plamondon sculpted three niches to hold Marial images in the facade of the chapel of Notre-Dame de Lourdes at Lac Bouchette. In 1954 Plamondon's stained glass windows were installed in the 1920s Église du Très-Saint-Sacrement in Quebec, adding color to a rather austere neo-Romanesque nave. He received a research grant from the Royal Society of Canada that let him visit Europe in 1955–56 to document ancient and modern stained glass. Plamondon was among the artists selected to decorate the interior of the Queen Elizabeth Hotel, owned by the Canadian National Railway, which opened in 1958. He contributed a stained glass mural. Others were Jean Dallaire (wall hanging), Claude Vermette (ceramic tiles), Julien Hébert (bronze elevator doors) and Albert Edward Cloutier (carved wooden panels).

In April 1957 Plamondon was invited to make the windows for the basilica of Saint Joseph's Oratory, Montreal. Between 1958 and 1978 Plamondon created ten windows in the aisles of the Oratory. These illustrate extraordinary actions of Saint Joseph, the patron saint of Quebec, in the life of the people of Canada. He also made fourteen stained glass windows for the clerestory representing the virtues and qualities of St. Joseph, as well as two semicircles and a rosette. The windows are educational and also contribute to the calm atmosphere of the basilica. The altar and crucifix in the basilica were made by Plamondon's former teacher, Henri Charlier.

Plamondon married Muriel Hall on 17 August 1944. She was a popular soprano who performed on radio and in concerts between 1930 and 1950. His wife continued to perform under her maiden name for some years. He died in 1976. A street in the Des Châtels quarter of Quebec City was named after him in 1985.

== Work ==
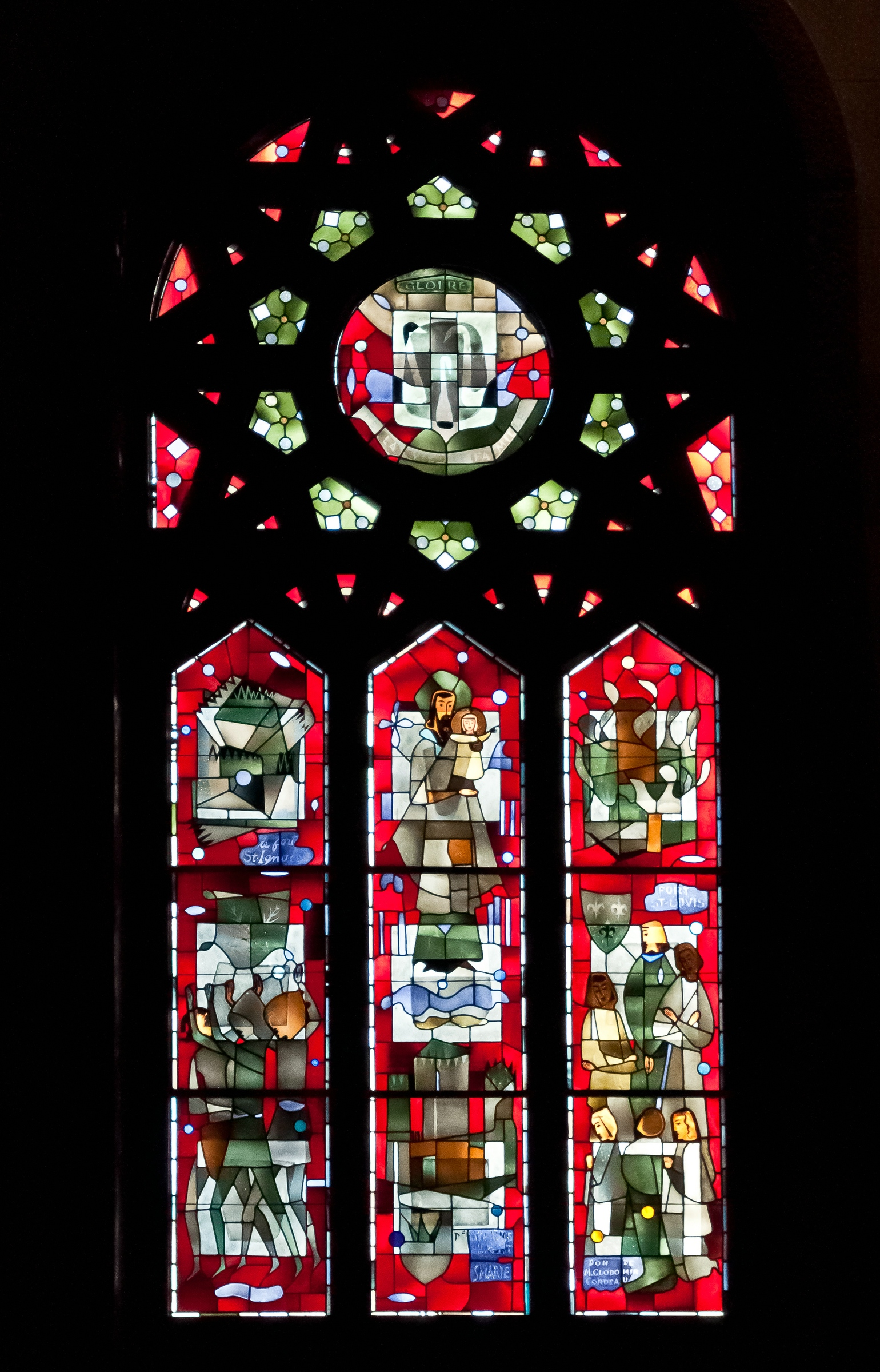
Window in Saint Joseph's Oratory, Montreal

Sites in Quebec that have stained glass windows made by Plamondon include:

- Basilica of Saint Joseph's Oratory, Montreal
- Novitiate of the Clerics of Saint Viator, Joliette
- Church of St. Charles Garnier College, Quebec
- Queen Elizabeth Hotel, Montreal
- Church of Très-Saint-Sacrement, Quebec
- Jesuit Chapel, Quebec

The ten windows in Saint Joseph's Oratory represent:

- Delivery of Fort Sainte-Marie (1630)
- Miracle of "St. Joseph" (1639)
- Victory of Frontenac over Phipps (1690)
- Congregation of men of Ville-Marie (1694)
- Vision of Marie-Catherine of Saint-Augustin (1657)
- Vision of Marie de l'Incarnation (1633–1634)
- Pilgrimage to St-Joseph-de-la-Pointe-Lévy (1697)
- Sinking of Walker (1711)
- Flight of the Bostonians (1776)
- Typhus in Bytown, Ottawa (1847)

== Sources ==
- Dubé, Philippe (2002). Marcel Baril: Figure Énigmatique de L'art Québécois. Presses Université Laval. ISBN 978-2-7637-7648-4.
- Guay, Bertrand (2011). "Muriel Hall, artiste et témoin". Opéra de Québec. Archived from the original on 2014-08-12.
- Hunter Publishing (2005-04-01). Ulysses Quebec City 3rd Ed. Ulysses Travel Guides. ISBN 978-2-89464-729-5.
- Hunter Publishing (2006-01-01). Ulysses Quebec. Ulysses Travel Guides. ISBN 978-2-89464-711-0.
- Laflèche, Christine; Routhier, Gilles (2001). "Le mouvement liturgique au Quebec". Vatican II au Canada. Les Editions Fides. ISBN 978-2-7621-2314-2.
- Lerner, Loren R.; Williamson, Mary F. (1991-01-01). Art and Architecture in Canada: A Bibliography and Guide to the Literature. University of Toronto Press. ISBN 978-0-8020-5856-0.
- "Marius-Plamondon, rue". Toponymie (in French). Ville de Québec. Archived from the original on 2014-08-12.
- Ostiguy, Jean-René (1982). National Gallery of Canada, and National Museums of Canada, Modernism in Quebec Art, 1916–1946. Ottawa: The National Gallery of Canada for the Corporation of National Museums of Canada.
- Robillard, Denise (2005). Les Merveilles de L'Oratoire: L'Oratoire Saint-Joseph du Mont-Royal, 1904–2004. Les Editions Fides. ISBN 978-2-7621-2615-0.
- Rodrigue, Serge (2014). "Marius Plamondon". Atelier Rodrigue Couleurs et Lumière. Archived from the original on 2013-06-24.
- Samuel, Alan Edouard; Maher, Peter (1998-11-01). Treasures of Canada. Dundurn. ISBN 978-0-88866-642-0.
- Turbide, Chantal (2011-09-14). "Les vitraux de la basilique de l'Oratoire Saint-Joseph: saint Joseph dans l'histoire canadienne". CHAIRE DE RECHERCHE DU CANADA EN PATRIMOINE ETHNOLOGIQUE, UNIVERSITÉ LAVAL.
- Ulysses Travel Guides (2004-01-01). Montreal. Ulysses Travel Guides. ISBN 978-2-89464-692-2.
