= Alice Nolin =

Canadian artist (1896–1967)

Alice Nolin (1896 – 1967) was a Canadian artist and educator.

She was born in Sorel, Quebec. Nolin studied painting with William Brymner and continued her studies at the École des beaux-arts de Montréal, studying with Charles Maillard, Emmanuel Fougerat and Alfred Laliberté. She worked with Alfred Laliberté in sculpture at the Monument-National. She also studied at the Académie Colarossi in Paris. In 1924, she won the Minister's Prize for sculpture at the École des beaux-arts de Montréal. Nolin also exhibited at the Royal Canadian Academy of Arts and at the exhibitions of the Art Association of Montreal from 1921 to 1935.

She taught at the École des Arts et Métiers at the Monument National from 1936 to 1946; she also taught at the École des beaux-arts de Montréal.

Nolin completed busts of Alfred Laliberté, Édouard Montpetit and Sir William Logan and a bas-relief of Charles Gill. She also created a bronze medallion for the tomb of Louis-Hippolyte Lafontaine in Notre Dame des Neiges Cemetery.

She died in 1967, probably in Montreal.

Four of her sculptures are in the public collections of the Musée national des beaux-arts du Québec and the Musée d'art de Joliette.

Rue Alice-Nolin in Montreal was named in her honour.
