= Small-angle approximation =

Simplification of the basic trigonometric functions

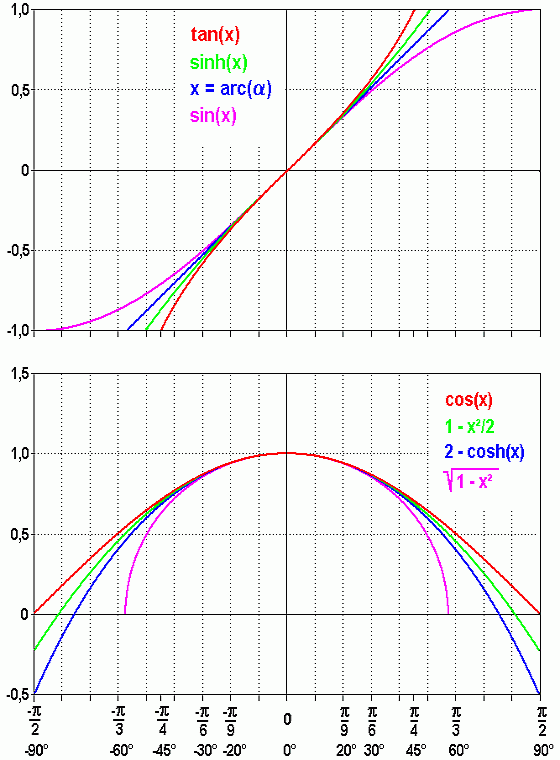
Approximately equal behavior of some (trigonometric) functions for x → 0

For small angles, the trigonometric functions sine, cosine, and tangent can be calculated with reasonable accuracy by the following simple approximations:

$$\begin{align}
\sin \theta &\approx \tan \theta \approx \theta, \\[5mu]
\cos \theta &\approx 1 - \tfrac12\theta^2 \approx 1,
\end{align}$$

provided the angle is measured in radians. Angles measured in degrees must first be converted to radians by multiplying them by $\pi/180$.

These approximations have a wide range of uses in branches of physics and engineering, including mechanics, electromagnetism, optics, cartography, astronomy, and computer science. One reason for this is that they can greatly simplify differential equations that do not need to be answered with absolute precision.

There are a number of ways to demonstrate the validity of the small-angle approximations. The most direct method is to truncate the Maclaurin series for each of the trigonometric functions. Depending on the order of the approximation, $\textstyle \cos \theta$ is approximated as either $1$ or as $1-\frac12\theta^2$.

== Justifications ==
=== Geometric ===

For a small angle, H and A are almost the same length, and therefore cos θ is nearly 1. The segment d (in red to the right) is the difference between the lengths of the hypotenuse, H, and the adjacent side, A, and has length $\textstyle H - \sqrt{H^2 - O^2}$, which for small angles is approximately equal to $\textstyle O^2\!/2H \approx \tfrac12 \theta^2H$. As a second-order approximation,
$$\cos{\theta} \approx 1 - \frac{\theta^2}{2}.$$

The opposite leg, O, is approximately equal to the length of the blue arc, s. The arc s has length θA, and by definition sin θ = O/H and tan θ = O/A, and for a small angle, O ≈ s and H ≈ A, which leads to:
$$\sin \theta = \frac{O}{H}\approx\frac{O}{A} = \tan \theta = \frac{O}{A} \approx \frac{s}{A} = \frac{A\theta}{A} = \theta.$$

Or, more concisely,
$$\sin \theta \approx \tan \theta \approx \theta.$$

=== Calculus ===
Using the squeeze theorem, one can prove that
$$\lim_{\theta \to 0} \frac{\sin(\theta)}{\theta} = 1,$$
which is a formal restatement of the approximation $\sin(\theta) \approx \theta$ for small values of θ.

A more careful application of the squeeze theorem proves that
$$\lim_{\theta \to 0} \frac{\tan(\theta)}{\theta} = 1,$$
from which we conclude that $\tan(\theta) \approx \theta$ for small values of θ.

Finally, L'Hôpital's rule tells us that
$$\lim_{\theta \to 0} \frac{\cos(\theta)-1}{\theta^2} = \lim_{\theta \to 0} \frac{-\sin(\theta)}{2\theta} = -\frac{1}{2},$$
which rearranges to $\cos(\theta) \approx 1 - \frac{\theta^2}{2}$ for small values of θ. Alternatively, we can use the double angle formula $\cos 2A \equiv 1-2\sin^2 A$. By letting $\theta = 2A$, we get that $\cos\theta=1-2\sin^2\frac{\theta}{2}\approx1-\frac{\theta^2}{2}$.

=== Algebraic ===
The small-angle approximation for the sine function.

The Taylor series expansions of trigonometric functions sine, cosine, and tangent near zero are:

$$\begin{align}
\sin \theta &= \theta - \frac16\theta^3 + \frac1{120}\theta^5 - \cdots, \\[6mu]
\cos \theta &= 1 - \frac1{2}{\theta^2} + \frac1{24}\theta^4 - \cdots, \\[6mu]
\tan \theta &= \theta + \frac{1}{3}\theta^3 + \frac{2}{15}\theta^5 + \cdots.
\end{align}$$

where $\theta$ is the angle in radians. For very small angles, higher powers of $\theta$ become extremely small, for instance if $\theta = 0.01$, then $\theta^3 = 0.000\,001$, just one ten-thousandth of $\theta$. Thus for many purposes it suffices to drop the cubic and higher terms and approximate the sine and tangent of a small angle using the radian measure of the angle, $\sin\theta \approx \tan\theta \approx \theta$, and drop the quadratic term and approximate the cosine as $\cos\theta \approx 1$.

If additional precision is needed the quadratic and cubic terms can also be included, $\sin\theta \approx \theta - \tfrac16\theta^3$, $\cos\theta \approx 1 - \tfrac12\theta^2$, and $\tan\theta \approx \theta + \tfrac13\theta^3$.

== Error of the approximations ==
A graph of the relative errors for the small angle approximations ($\tan \theta \approx \theta$, $\sin \theta \approx \theta$, $\textstyle \cos \theta \approx 1 - \tfrac12\theta^2$)

Near zero, the relative error of the approximations $\cos \theta \approx 1$, $\sin \theta \approx \theta$, and $\tan \theta \approx \theta$ is quadratic in $\theta$: for each order of magnitude smaller the angle is, the relative error of these approximations shrinks by two orders of magnitude. The approximation $\textstyle \cos \theta \approx 1 - \tfrac12\theta^2$ has relative error which is quartic in $\theta$: for each order of magnitude smaller the angle is, the relative error shrinks by four orders of magnitude.

Figure 3 shows the relative errors of the small angle approximations. The angles at which the relative error exceeds 1% are as follows:

- $\cos \theta \approx 1$ at about 0.14 radians (8.1°)
- $\tan \theta \approx \theta$ at about 0.17 radians (9.9°)
- $\sin \theta \approx \theta$ at about 0.24 radians (14.0°)
- $\textstyle \cos \theta \approx 1 - \tfrac12\theta^2$ at about 0.66 radians (37.9°)

== Slide-rule approximations ==
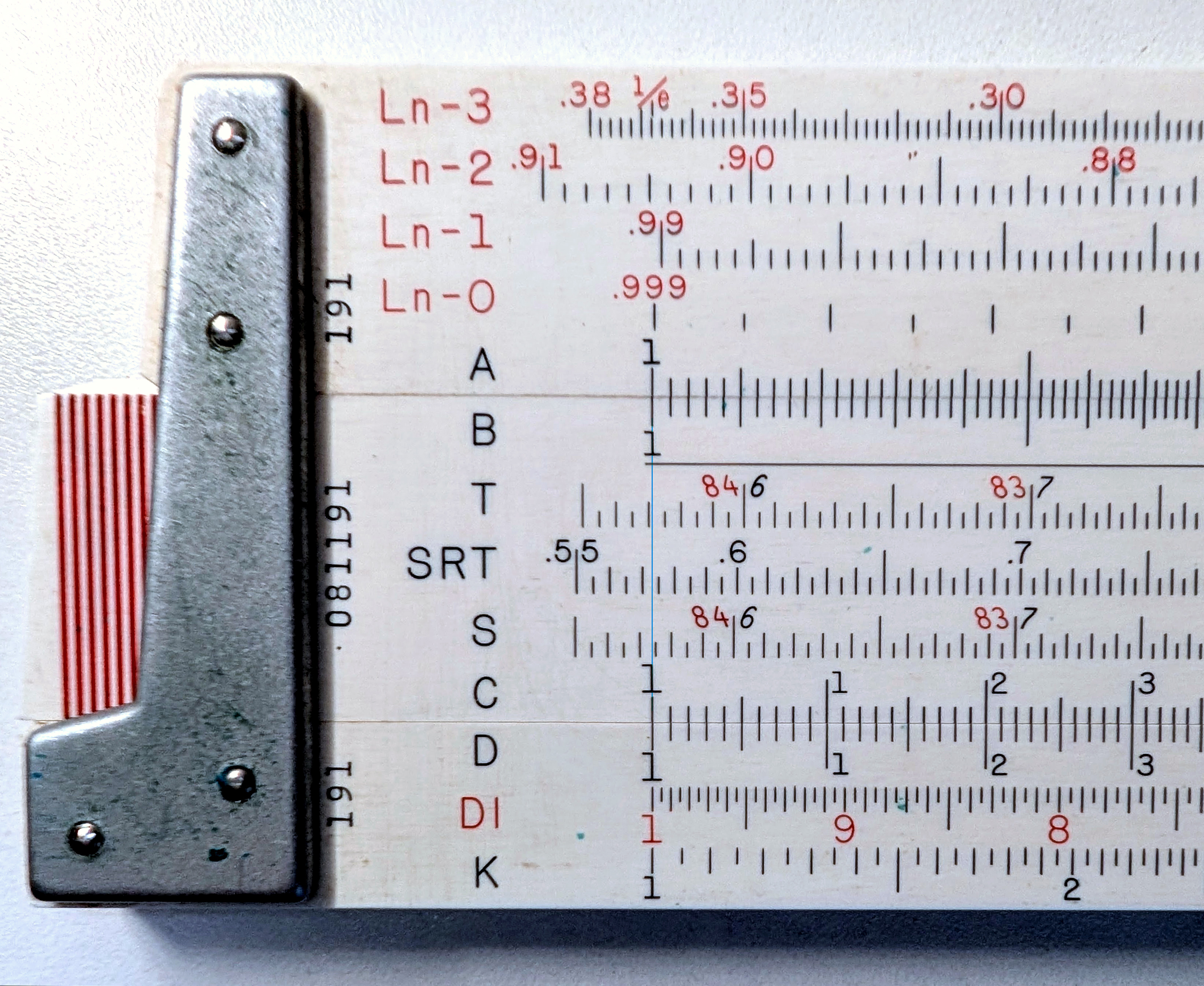
The left end of a Keuffel & Esser Deci-Lon slide rule, with a thin blue line added to show the values on the S, T, and SRT scales corresponding to sine and tangent values of 0.1 and 0.01. The S scale shows arcsine(0.1) = 5.74 degrees; the T scale shows arctangent(0.1) = 5.71 degrees; the SRT scale shows arcsine(0.01) = arctangent(0.01) = 0.01*180/pi = 0.573 degrees (to within "slide-rule accuracy").

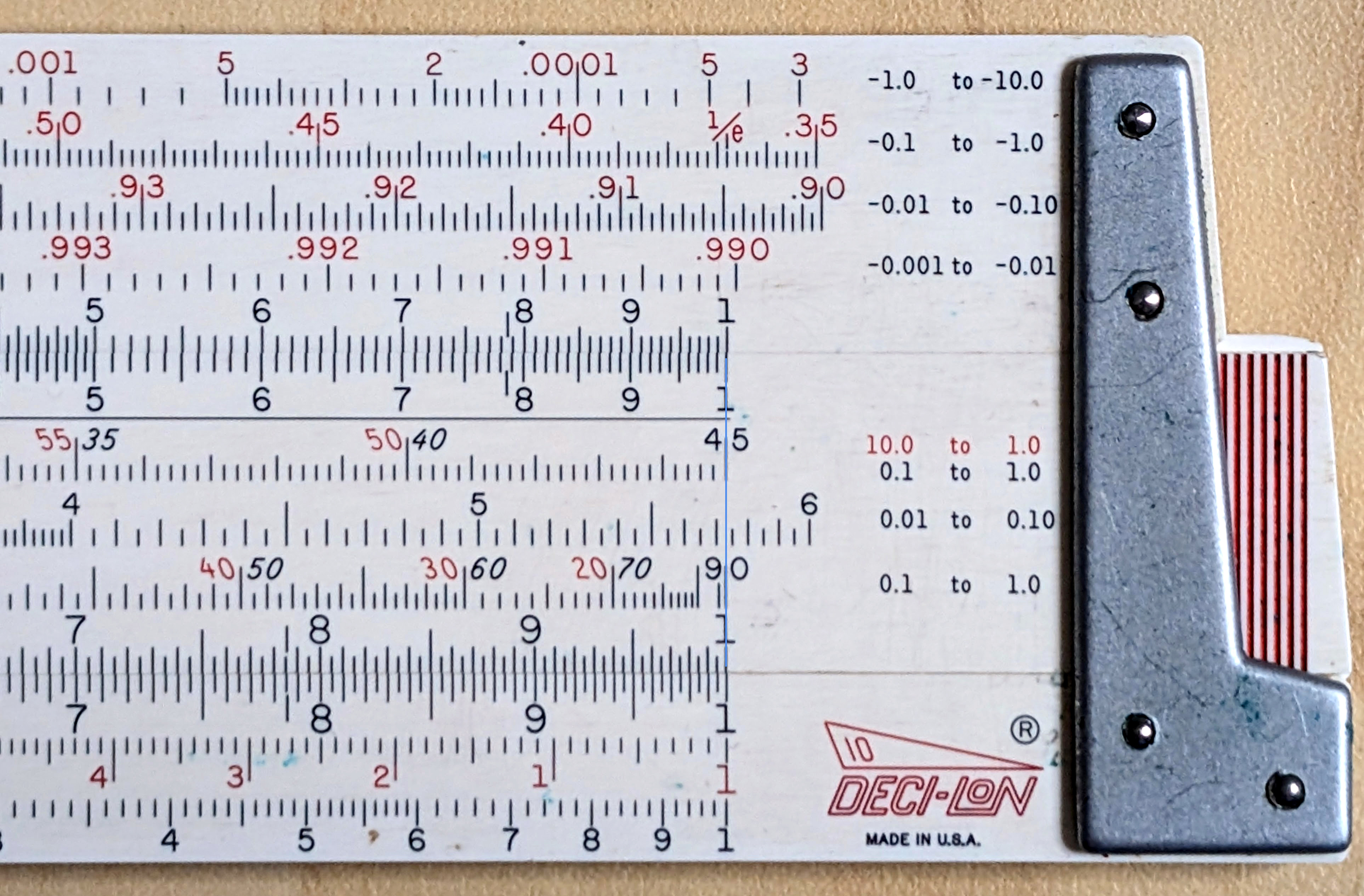
The right end of a K&E Decilon slide rule with a line to show the calibration of the SRT scale at 5.73 degrees.

Many slide rules – especially "trig" and higher models – include an "ST" (sines and tangents) or "SRT" (sines, radians, and tangents) scale on the front or back of the slide, for computing with sines and tangents of angles smaller than about 0.1 radian.

The right-hand end of the ST or SRT scale cannot be accurate to three decimal places for both arcsine(0.1) = 5.74 degrees and arctangent(0.1) = 5.71 degrees, so sines and tangents of angles near 5 degrees are given with somewhat worse than the usual expected "slide-rule accuracy". Some slide rules, such as the K&E Deci-Lon in the photo, calibrate 0.1 to be accurate for radian conversion, at 5.73 degrees (off by nearly 0.4% for the tangent and 0.2% for the sine for angles around 5 degrees). Others are calibrated to 5.725 degrees, to balance the sine and tangent errors at below 0.3%.

== Angle sum and difference ==
The angle addition and subtraction theorems can be simplified when one of the angles is small (if $\beta$ is very small then $\cos\beta \approx 1$ and $\sin \beta \approx \beta$):
$$\begin{align}
\cos(\alpha + \beta) &\approx \cos\alpha - \beta\sin\alpha, \\
\cos(\alpha - \beta) &\approx \cos\alpha + \beta\sin\alpha, \\
\sin(\alpha + \beta) &\approx \sin\alpha + \beta\cos\alpha, \\
\sin(\alpha - \beta) &\approx \sin\alpha - \beta\cos\alpha.
\end{align}$$

== Specific uses ==
=== Astronomy ===
In astronomy, the angular size or angle subtended by the image of a distant object is often only a few arcseconds (denoted by the symbol ″), so it is well suited to the small angle approximation. The linear size (D) is related to the angular size (X) and the distance from the observer (d) by the simple formula:

$$D = X \frac{d}{206\,265{''}}$$

where X is measured in arcseconds.

The quantity 206265″ is approximately equal to the number of arcseconds in 1 radian, which is the number of arcseconds in a circle (1296000″) divided by 2π.

The exact formula is

$$D = d \tan \left( X \frac{2\pi}{1\,296\,000{''}} \right)$$

and the above approximation follows when tan X is replaced by X.

For example, the parsec is defined by the value of d when D=1 AU, X=1 arcsecond, but the definition used is the small-angle approximation (the first equation above).

=== Motion of a pendulum ===
The second-order cosine approximation is especially useful in calculating the potential energy of a pendulum, which can then be applied with a Lagrangian to find the indirect (energy) equation of motion. When calculating the period of a simple pendulum, the small-angle approximation for sine is used to allow the resulting differential equation to be solved easily by comparison with the differential equation describing simple harmonic motion.

=== Optics ===
In optics, the small-angle approximations form the basis of the paraxial approximation.

=== Wave interference ===
The sine and tangent small-angle approximations are used in relation to the double-slit experiment or a diffraction grating to develop simplified equations like the following, where y is the distance of a fringe from the center of maximum light intensity, m is the order of the fringe, D is the distance between the slits and projection screen, and d is the distance between the slits:
$$y \approx \frac{m\lambda D}{d}$$

=== Structural mechanics ===
The small-angle approximation also appears in structural mechanics, especially in stability and bifurcation analyses (mainly of axially-loaded columns ready to undergo buckling). This leads to significant simplifications, though at a cost in accuracy and insight into the true behavior.

=== Piloting ===
The 1 in 60 rule used in air navigation has its basis in the small-angle approximation, plus the fact that one radian is approximately 60 degrees.

=== Interpolation ===
The formulas for addition and subtraction involving a small angle may be used for interpolating between trigonometric table values:

Example: sin(0.755)
$$\begin{align}
\sin(0.755) &= \sin(0.75 + 0.005) \\
& \approx \sin(0.75) + (0.005) \cos(0.75) \\
& \approx  (0.6816) + (0.005)(0.7317) \\
& \approx  0.6853.
\end{align}$$
where the values for sin(0.75) and cos(0.75) are obtained from trigonometric table. The result is accurate to the four digits given.

== See also ==
- Skinny triangle
- Versine
- Exsecant
