= Jean-Louis Lalonde =

Canadian architect (1923–2007)

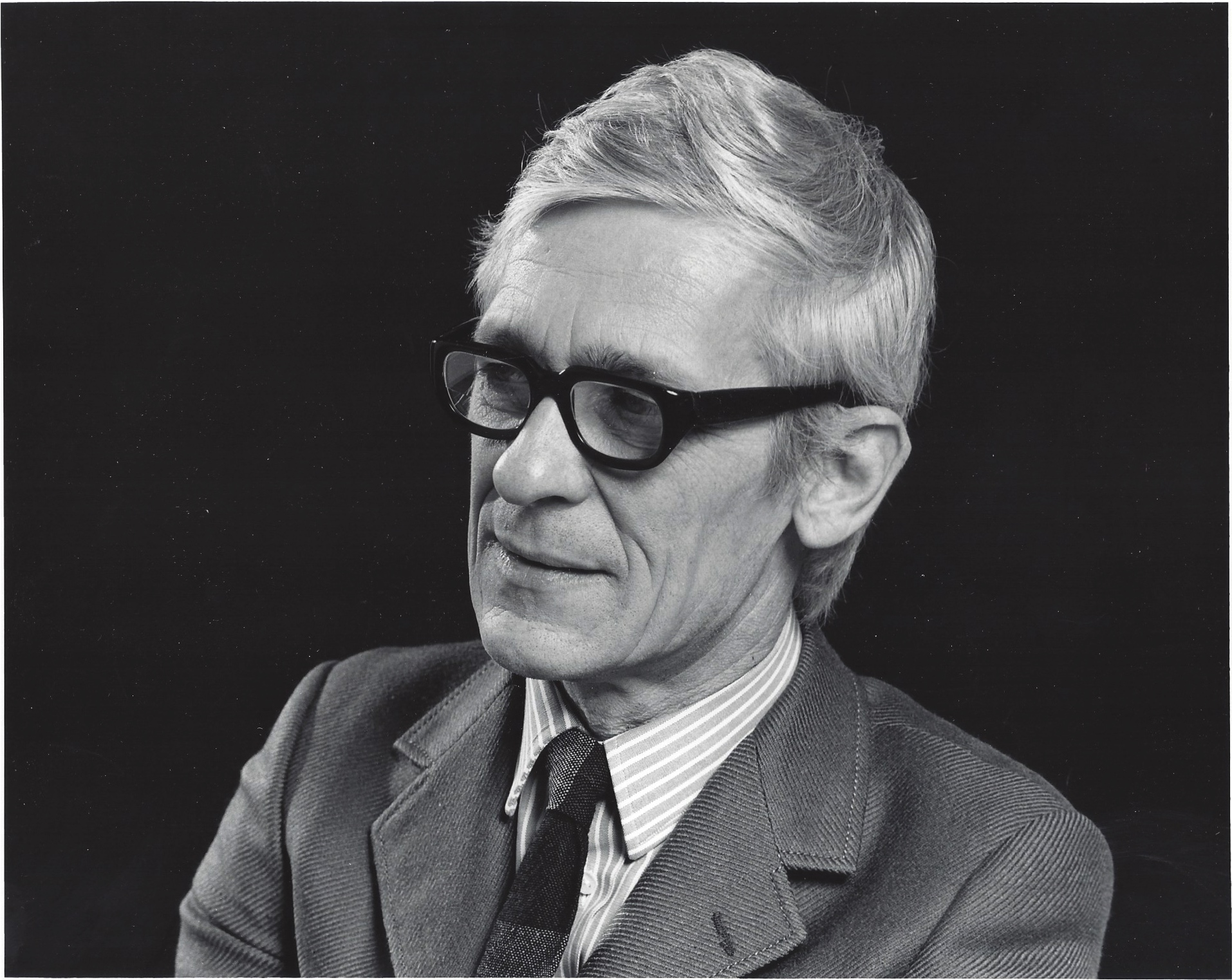
- Born: June 17, 1923
- Died: May 30, 2007 (aged 83)
- Occupation: Architect
- Spouse: Gisèle Bissonnette (m. 1950)
- Projects: Centre des congrès de Montréal; Montréal Municipal Housing Corporation; Place Saint-Henri Metro Station

Jean-Louis Lalonde (French pronunciation: [ʒɑ̃ lwi lalɔ̃d]; 17 June 1923- 30 May 2007) was a Montréal based Canadian architect, perhaps most famous for his pioneering work with the Montréal Municipal Housing Corporation, Place Saint-Henri Metro Station, the Centre des congrès de Montréal and his involvement with the promotion of architecture worldwide.

He was born in Saint-Polycarpe and spent his schooling years as a resident of the Collège de Rigaud. After receiving his architecture degree from the École des beaux-arts de Montréal where he met his wife Gisèle (Bissonnette) — who was studying painting in the master class of Alfred Pellan, he moved to Paris in 1950 where he was hired by Walter Gropius as construction site manager for the Palais de l’UNESCO, designed by a consortium of Bernard Zehrfuss, Marcel Breuer and Pier Luigi Nervi. During his tenure, he met and collaborated with such artists as Pablo Picasso, Alexander Calder and Joan Miró, to name a few.

He married Gisèle Bissonnette in 1950 and they had two sons, Pier and Marc. Pier was named after Italian architect and project co-designer Pier Luigi Nervi.

After seven years working in Paris and London, he returned to Montréal, where he worked at the Montréal firm of Bland, Rother and Trudeau. In the early 60's, he teamed up with long-time friend Julien Hébert and founded the firm of Hébert & Lalonde, a firm that combined architecture, graphic, environmental and industrial design.

He had many successful collaborations with different artists and sculptors over the years, namely lifetime time friend Charles Daudelin, and won prestigious competitions with him, such as the Maison de Trois-Rivières, Maison de demain, Demeure de l’Avenir ou Maison de béton, École Saint-Damase, etc.

During the 70's, Mr. Lalonde developed a unique expertise in designing and building more modern, humane and ergonomic social housing. Many of which won the firm international praise. He also designed the Montréal Métro station Place Sain-Henri, and was part of the consortium which designed and built the original Palais des Congrès de Montréal.

He was one of the original members of the Commission Jacques-Viger, whose mandate was the study —and ensuing recommendations— of Old Montréal's patrimonial assets.

He worked on a variety of projects over his career, from private residences to the Lachute Water Treatment plant in Québec, to hospitals, public housing, etc.

Jean-Louis Lalonde was also very involved in the promotion of architecture through his life as president of the Ordre des architects du Québec (OAQ), the Royal Architectural Institute of Canada (RAIC) in 1971-1972 and vice-president of the International Union of Architects (UIA).

He died on May 30, 2007, from lymphatic cancer.
