= Mariette Rousseau-Vermette =

Canadian tapestry artist

- Born: August 29, 1926; Trois-Pistoles, Quebec, Canada
- Died: March 28, 2006 (aged 79); Montreal, Quebec, Canada
- Known for: Tapestry
- Spouse: Claude Vermette

Mariette Rousseau-Vermette, OC (August 29, 1926 – - 28, 2006) was a noted Quebec-based Canadian tapestry artist who pioneered innovations in the fiber/textile arts during the 1960–1980s.

== Biography ==
Rousseau-Vermette was born in Trois-Pistoles, Quebec and studied art in the late 1940s at the l'Ecole des Beaux-Arts de Quebec, with Dorothy Liebes in San Francisco, at the California College of Arts and Crafts in Oakland, and privately throughout Europe and Asia.

She created tapestries that experimented with scale, form, material and color, that became known as tapestry-paintings. In addition to appearing in numerous solo and group exhibitions, she became internationally recognized when she received several prestigious commissions, including the curtain for the Eisenhower Theatre in Washington's Kennedy Center, and the ceiling of Roy Thomson Hall in Toronto. Some of her estimated 600 signed works are held in the Musée national des beaux-arts du Québec, the National Gallery of Canada in Ottawa, the Metropolitan Museum of Art and Rockefeller Center in New York, and the Museum of Modern Art in Kyoto.

She was head of the Fibre program at The Banff Centre from 1979 to 1985.

Rousseau-Vermette was married to the artist Claude Vermette. She died in Montreal in 2006.

== Awards ==
- Officer of the Order of Canada (1976)
- Diplome d'Honneur from the Canadian Conference of the Arts.
