= Henri Charlier =

French painter and sculptor (1883–1975)

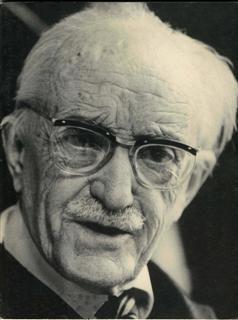
- Born: 18 April 1883; Paris, France
- Died: 24 December 1975 (aged 92); Mesnil-Saint-Loup, France
- Occupations: Painter and sculptor
- Known for: Religious art

Henri Charlier (19 April 1883 – 24 December 1975) was a French painter and sculptor, noted for his religious art. He also wrote essays on art and music.

== Early years ==
Henri Charlier was born in the Montmartre quarter of Paris on 19 April 1883. His father, Charles Charlier, was a freemason and strongly anti-Catholic. Henri was not baptized and was raised without any religious instruction. He began to study the piano when he was eight, and music would always be an important part of his life. He attended the Lycée Janson de Sailly for his secondary education. During his childhood and adolescence he would spend his summer vacations with his maternal grandparents Clovis and Nathalie Bidet, winemakers at Cheny, Yonne.

== Painter ==
He completed his first oil painting in 1899. In 1901 he studied law for a year in accordance with his father's wishes, but had no interest in the subject. He thought of becoming a historian, but then decided on Fine Arts. In 1902 he entered the studio of Jean-Paul Laurens for a year. He continued to study painting at the Académie Colarossi, and pursued a career as a painter until the age of thirty. He obtained a position teaching drawing in 1904, which he held until 1914. He continued to study, and made the acquaintance of Rodin, Matisse and Bourdel. On 25 August 1906 he contracted a civil marriage with Émilie Boudard.

Charlier exhibited at the Salon of Independent Artists in 1911, and later was shown in several other exhibitions. He converted to Christianity in 1913. After this he often visited the Benedictine monastery of Saint-Louis du Temple, where he became the friend of Dom Poitevin et Dom Besse. In July 1914 the Charliers went on vacation at a friend's home in Burgundy. On 2 August 1914 they heard of the general mobilization at the start of World War I (1914–18). Henri Charlier enlisted as a volunteer and was drafted as a medical assistant. In March 1916 he was appointed to the Hospital of Commercy, Meuse. That year he exhibited a painted bas-relief at the Salon des Artistes Indépendants. The architect Maurice Storez bought the bas-relief and invited Charlier to become a founding member of the society of Christian artists and architects. At this time Charlier became a sculptor.

== Sculptor ==
In 1919 Henri et Emilie Charlier moved to the family house in Cheny, and transformed the barn into a studio for sculpture. That year Henri made a barefoot pilgrimage from Paris to Chartres. Between 1921 and 1926 he executed several large stone monuments to the dead. He exhibited a statue of Joan of Art at the Salon d’Automne in 1922, which was well received. In 1924 he exhibited "The Angel of the Apocalypse" at the Salon des Tuileries. In 1925 the Charliers moved to Mesnil-Saint-Loup, where he devoted himself to sculpture in stone and wood. He taught several pupils including the painter Bernard Bouts, with whom Charlier founded a stained glass studio at Mesnil. In 1929 Sylvia Daoust (1902–1974) came on a scholarship from Montreal to study sculpture with Charlier. In October 1938 the Canadian Marius Plamondon (1914–1976) came to work with Charlier for a period.

Charlier wrote a book Culture, École, Métier in which he urged a renewal of education, starting with the teachers. He wrote that "it is indispensable that teaching break loose from the sort of academism of letters or of thought which tends to judge everything by means of general ideas. ... Teaching must fill up with intellectual experience and not with ready-made formulas." He said that the closer teachers came to the trade workshop the better they would be.

Charlier created a fresco to decorate the tomb of Brother André in Saint Joseph's Oratory in Montreal, Quebec, Canada. He also made the altar, crucifix and wooden statues of the twelve apostles for the oratory.

Henri Charlier died in Mesnil-Saint-Loup on 24 December 1975.

== Publications ==
- Culture, école, métier, Grenoble-Paris, B. Arthaud, [1942]; 2nd edition, Paris, Nouvelles éditions latines, 1959.
- avec Lucien Gachon, Henri Pourrat, André Bossuat, Henri Charlier, Alexandre Vialatte, Visages de l'Auvergne, Paris, Éditions des Horizons de France, 1943.
- Jean-Philippe Rameau, illustrations de l'auteur, Lyon, Éditions et imprimeries du Sud-Est, 1955.
- Le Martyre de l'art ou l'Art livré aux bêtes, suivi d'une enquête (signée E.B.T. Lichard), avec 6 dessins de l'auteur, pamphlet, Paris, Nouvelles éditions latines, 1957; rééd. Éditions Dominique Martin Morin, 1989. ISBN 2-8565-2108-8
- François Couperin, illustrated by the author, Lyon, Éditions et imprimeries du Sud-Est, 1965.
- Le Chant grégorien, Colombes, M. Morin, 1967.
- L'Art et la pensée, Jarzé, Dominique Martin Morin, 1972.
- La Messe ancienne et la nouvelle, Jarzé, Dominique Martin Morin, 1973. (extrait de Itinéraires)

== Sources ==
- Gallagher, Gregory; Lejtenyi, Patrick (2012-04-02). Top 10 Montreal & Quebec City. DK Publishing. p. 11. ISBN 978-0-7566-9137-0.
- Heller, Jules; Heller, Nancy G. (2013-12-19). North American Women Artists of the Twentieth Century: A Biographical Dictionary. Routledge. ISBN 978-1-135-63882-5.
- Laignier, François (2008-05-19). "Henri Charlier, Sculpteur et peintre (1883–1975) Chronologie" (PDF). Présence des Charlier.
- Robillard, Denise (2005). Les Merveilles de L'Oratoire: L'Oratoire Saint-Joseph du Mont-Royal, 1904–2004. Les Editions Fides. ISBN 978-2-7621-2615-0.
- Taylor, James S. (1998). Poetic Knowledge: The Recovery of Education. SUNY Press. ISBN 978-0-7914-3585-4.
