= Place-Saint-Henri station =

Montreal Metro station

Place-Saint-Henri

General information
- Location: 555, rue Saint-Ferdinand; Montreal, Quebec H4C 3L7; Canada
- Coordinates: 45°28′38″N 73°35′12″W
- Operator: Société de transport de Montréal
- Platforms: 2 side platforms
- Tracks: 2
- Connections: STM bus

Construction
- Depth: 17.7 metres (58 feet 1 inch), 20th deepest
- Accessible: Yes
- Architect: Julien Hébert & Jean-Louis Lalonde

Other information
- Fare zone: ARTM: A

History
- Opened: 28 April 1980

Passengers
- 2024: 2,306,043 ▲10.58%
- Rank: 47 of 68

Services
Preceding station	Montreal Metro	Following station
Vendôme toward Côte-Vertu	Orange Line	Lionel-Groulx toward Montmorency
Location

Place-Saint-Henri station (French pronunciation: [plas sɛ̃ ɑ̃ʁi]) is a Montreal Metro station in the borough of Le Sud-Ouest in Montreal, Quebec, Canada. It is operated by the Société de transport de Montréal (STM) and serves the Orange Line. It is located in the Saint-Henri neighbourhood.

The station opened on April 28, 1980, as the western terminus of the first extension of the Orange Line, replacing Bonaventure station as the terminus until the extension to Snowdon station opened in 1981.

== Overview ==
Station concourse

The station was designed by Julien Hébert and Jean-Louis Lalonde. The station is a normal side platform station that is connected by long stairwells to a large mezzanine. The station has three accesses; one is a conventional access within a bus loop, and the other two are glass walled entrances linking to staircases and elevators linked to an underground gallery connected to the mezzanine.

== Station improvements ==
In November 2020, work began at the station to make it universally accessible. As part of this project, the Saint-Jacques North and South exits were closed, new entrance buildings with elevators were built, and a new piece of artwork was commissioned. Place Saint-Henri was also refurbished. During construction, the main entrance on Saint-Ferdinand remained open. The two entrances and elevators were completed in December of 2024.

== Artwork ==
The station originally contained two artworks: a mural by Hébert in the mezzanine, entitled Bonheur d'occasion, featuring the title of the famous book by Gabrielle Roy (in English called The Tin Flute), set in the neighbourhood; and a motorized mobile sculpture by Jacques de Tonnancour suspended in the mezzanine and over the platforms.

In 2001, a statue of Jacques Cartier by Joseph-Arthur Vincent (originally created in 1896), was moved to the station and placed in a light shaft over the Côte-Vertu bound platform. It had formerly crowned a fountain in a nearby park, but was removed, moved to the station, and replaced with a copy after it crumbled due to exposure.

== Origin of the name ==
This station is named for place Saint-Henri, a short street and public square between rue Saint-Jacques and rue Notre-Dame. The place and the district took their name from a chapel built in 1810 and placed under the protection of Saint Henry, possibly to commemorate Henri-Auguste Roux (1798–1831), superior of Saint-Sulpice Seminary.

== Connecting bus routes ==
Société de transport de Montréal
No.	Route	Connects to	Service times / notes
17	Décarie	Vendôme; Snowdon; Namur; De La Savane; Du Collège; Côte-Vertu	Daily
35	Griffintown	Angrignon; Monk; Square-Victoria-OACI; McGill	Daily
36	Monk	Angrignon; Monk; Square-Victoria-OACI	Daily
190	Norman	Lionel-Groulx	Weekdays only
371 ☾	Décarie	Côte-Vertu; Du Collège; De La Savane; Namur; Snowdon; Lionel-Groulx; Atwater	Night service

== Nearby points of interest ==
- École secondaire Saint-Henri - École des métiers du Sud-Ouest
- Piscine Saint-Henri
- Parc Saint-Henri
- CLSC Saint-Henri
- Parc Sir-Georges-Étienne-Cartier
- POPIR Comité Logement
- Institut technique Aviron
- Parc Louis-Cyr
- Théâtre Dôme
- Musée des ondes Emile-Berliner

== Film and television appearances ==
Scenes from Denys Arcand's film Jésus de Montréal ("Jesus of Montreal") were filmed in the station.
