= Sylvia Daoust =

Canadian sculptor (1902–2004)

- Sylvia Daoust by Gabriel Desmarais; October 1963 Bibliothèque et Archives nationales du Québec
- Born: May 24, 1902; Montreal, Quebec, Canada
- Died: July 19, 2004 (aged 102); Montreal, Quebec, Canada
- Resting place: Notre Dame des Neiges Cemetery
- Known for: Sculptor

Sylvia Daoust, CM, CQ RCA (May 24, 1902 – July 19, 2004) was a Canadian sculptor who was one of the first women sculptors in Quebec. She studied at the Council of Arts & Manufactures and the École des Beaux-Arts, with Charles Maillard and Maurice Feliz, and later with Edwin Holgate at the Art Association of Montreal.

She won many notable prizes for her work, which has been exhibited in institutions in the United States, Italy, and Canada. She is known for her portrait sculptures, and for revitalizing the traditions of liturgical art. Daoust was also one of the original members of the organization Le Retable d'Art Sacre, a group that helped transform the state of Roman Catholic churches in French Canada. Daoust died in Montreal in 2004 at the age of 102.

== Life and education ==
Daoust was born on May 24, 1902, in Montreal, Quebec, the eldest of seven children. From an early age she began drawing, sketching, painting and also sculpting clay figurines. The figurines caught the eye of the Sisters of St. Anne, who encouraged her to enroll at the École des Beaux-Arts de Québec.

In 1915, she began studying at the Conseil des arts et manufactures with Joseph Franchère, Joseph Saint-Charles and John Young Johnstone. In 1923, Daoust enrolled in the École des beaux arts, which had just recently opened. In 1927, she graduated with a specialized teaching degree in drawing. In 1929, Daoust won the Lord Willingdon Competition, the first-place prize in an inter-provincial competition for sculpture and in the same year received a scholarship to study in France from the province of Québec She studied in France with Henri Charlier. She returned home in 1930, teaching drawing, anatomy, modeling, and sculpting at the École des Beaux-Arts in Québec City until 1943. Daoust then moved back to Montreal to be a professor of wood and stone sculpting at the Montreal School of Fine Arts (1943–1968).

After her death in 2004, she was buried in the Notre Dame des Neiges Cemetery in Montreal.

== Work ==
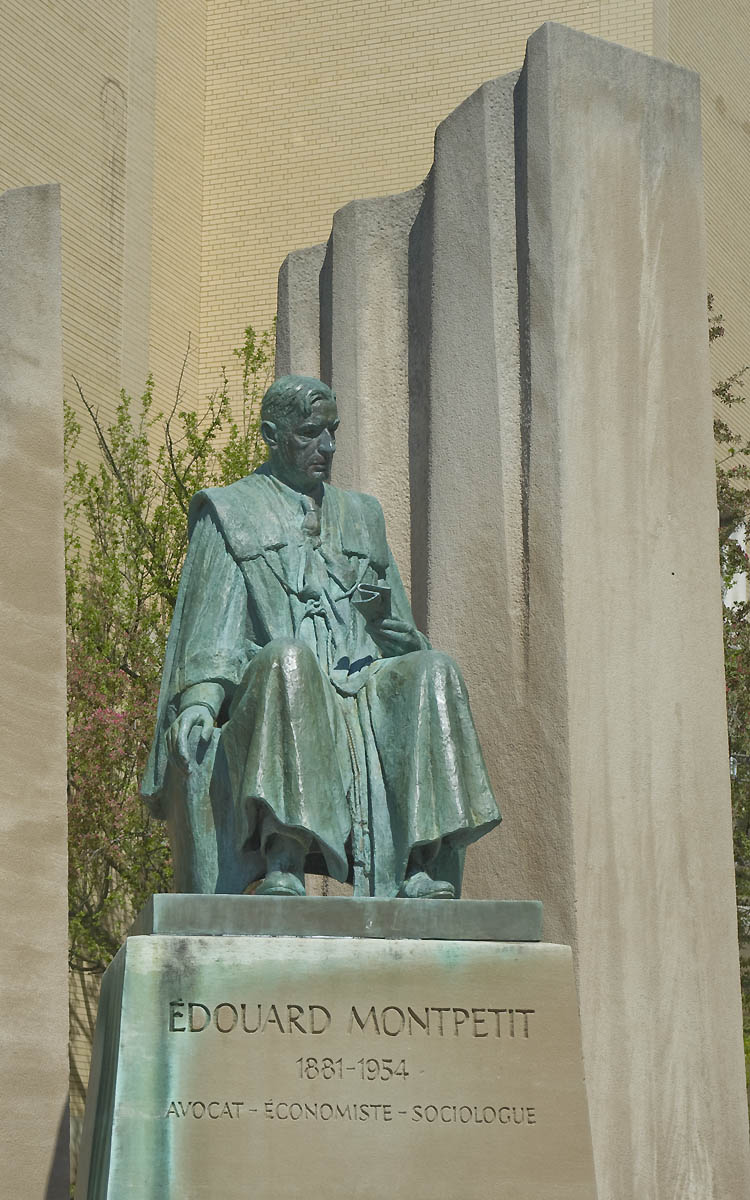
Edouard Mont Petit (1967) by Sylvia Daoust

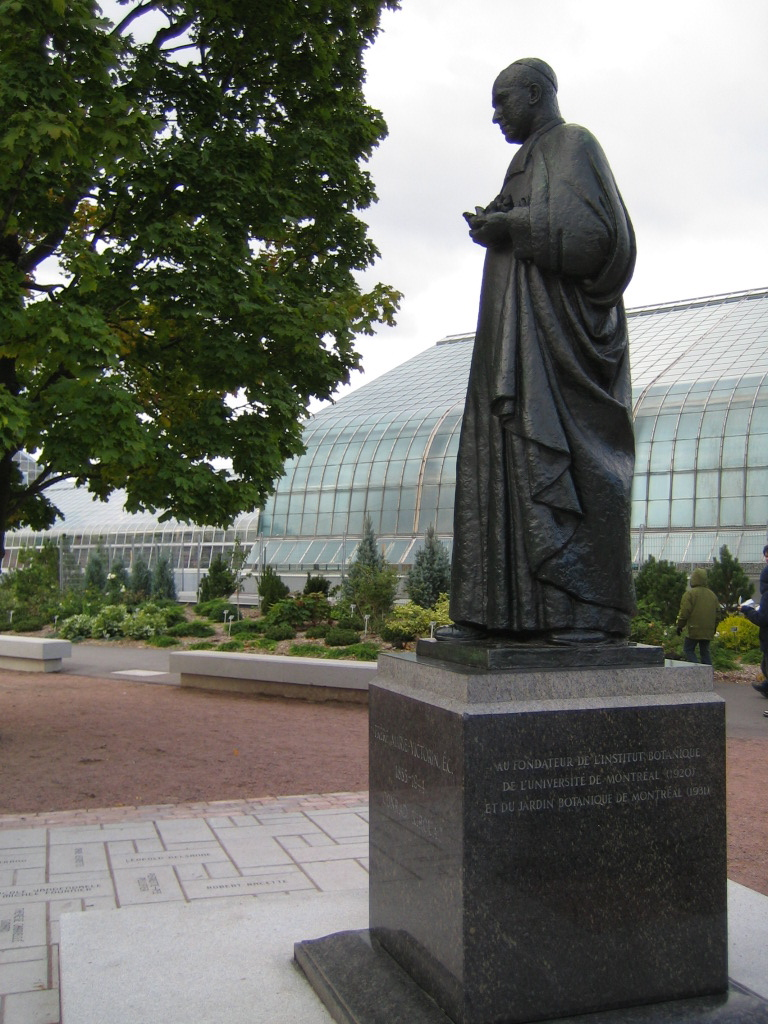
Frère Marie-Victorin (1951) by Sylvia Daoust

The majority of Daoust's works are religious in content and form. They have been described as a combination of the formal characteristics of modernism with the austerity of sculpture of the Middle Ages.

While she did extensive work in the classroom, 1948 marked the beginning her career in modernist art alongside fellow artist and peer, Paul-Émile Borduas. During the early 1940s movement of sacred art, she became acquainted with Dom Bello, the architect of Saint Benedict Abbey in Saint-Benoit-du-Lac, Québec. She put aside her pursuit of modernist art and delved into scared art. Dom Bellot was in charge of Saint Joseph's Oratory and she worked with his guidance there and in collaboration with Henri Charlier. Her transition into sacred art was marked by the production of approximately thirty wooden statues to which she added colour accents and experimented with different materials such as aluminum and leather. She participated in over twenty exhibits and collectives, although much of her work was not displayed in art galleries.

Daoust was one of the original founding members of Le Retable d'Art Sacre, an organization that advocated and promoted the standards of religious art within the Roman Catholic churches in Québec. She continued to sculpt into her 90s, and her last works were for the chapel of the Holy Cross Fathers in Montreal.

== Collections and awards ==
Daoust's works are in the collection of the Musée national des beaux-arts du Québec, and the National Gallery of Canada, among others.

Her public sculptures include the bronze of Nicolas Viel adorning the façade of the Quebec Legislature (National Assembly), Mary Queen of the World at Montreal's Mary, Queen of the World Cathedral and a statue of Édouard Montpetit at the Université de Montréal.

In 1942, she won the first prize for Our Lady of Montreal, in the competition held on the occasion of the Third Centenary of the Founding Nationale de St. Jean Baptiste. In 1951, she was named to the Royal Canadian Academy of Art and in 1961 she was awarded the Royal Architectural Institute of Canada's Allied Arts Award. In 1975, Daoust won the Philippe Hébert Prize by the St. Jean Baptiste Society. In 1976, she was made a member of the Order of Canada and honoured in 1987 as a chevalier of the Ordre national du Québec.

== Honours ==
- Allied Arts Medal, Royal Architectural Institute of Canada, 1961.
- Royal Society of Canada
- Order of Canada, 1976
- Ordre national du Québec
- Royal Canadian Academy of Arts
