= Siriometer =

Unit of measurement

The siriometer is an obsolete astronomical unit of length, defined to be equal to one million astronomical units (au). One siriometer is approximately 149.6 petametres; 4.848 parsecs; 15.81 light-years. The distance from Earth to the star Sirius is then approximately 0.54 siriometers.

The unit was proposed in 1911 by Carl V. L. Charlier, who worked on stellar statistics. Charlier originally used the symbol 'sir' but the symbol 'Sm' has also seen use.

The siriometer never gained widespread usage. Frank Dyson (the Astronomer Royal) objected to the name siriometer, because "it suggests a machine for measuring". The first General Assembly of the International Astronomical Union in 1922 adopted the parsec as the standard unit of stellar distances, which simplified the definition of absolute magnitude. Use of the siriometer seems to have disappeared from the astronomical literature by c. 1930. Modern professional astronomers use the parsec as their primary unit for distances larger than the Solar System.
