= Parsec =

Unit of length in astronomy

parsec
- A parsec is the distance from the Sun to an astronomical object that has a parallax angle of one arcsecond (not to scale)

General information
- Unit system: astronomical units
- Unit of: length/distance
- Symbol: pc

Conversions
1 pc in ...	... is equal to ...
- metric (SI) units: 3.0857×10^{16} m ≈ 31 petametres
- imperial/US units: 1.9174×10^{13} mi
- astronomical units: 206,265 au 3.26156 ly

The parsec (symbol: pc) is a unit of length used to measure the large distances to astronomical objects outside the Solar System, approximately equal to 3.26 light-years, 206,265 astronomical units (au), or 30.9 trillion kilometres (19.2 trillion miles). (Note: One trillion here is short scale, ie. 10^{12} (one million million, or billion in long scale).) The parsec unit is obtained by the use of parallax and trigonometry, and is defined as the distance at which 1 au subtends an angle of one arcsecond (1/3600 of a degree). The nearest star, Proxima Centauri, is about 1.3 parsecs (4.2 light-years) from the Sun: from that distance, the gap between the Earth and the Sun spans slightly less than one arcsecond. Most stars visible to the naked eye are within a few hundred parsecs of the Sun, with the most distant at a few thousand parsecs, and the Andromeda Galaxy at over 700,000 parsecs (2,283,000 ly).

The word parsec is a shortened form of a distance corresponding to a parallax of one arcsecond, coined by the British astronomer Herbert Hall Turner in 1913. The unit was introduced to simplify the calculation of astronomical distances from raw observational data. Partly for this reason, it is the unit preferred in astronomy and astrophysics, though in popular science texts and common usage the light-year remains prominent. Although parsecs are used for the shorter distances within the Milky Way, multiples of parsecs are required for the larger scales in the universe, including kiloparsecs (kpc) for the more distant objects within and around the Milky Way, megaparsecs (Mpc) for mid-distance galaxies, and gigaparsecs (Gpc) for many quasars and the most distant galaxies.

In August 2015, the International Astronomical Union (IAU) passed Resolution B2 which, as part of the definition of a standardized absolute and apparent bolometric magnitude scale, mentioned an existing explicit definition of the parsec as exactly 648000/π au, or 96939420213600000/π ≈ 30856775814913673 metres, given the IAU 2012 exact definition of the astronomical unit in metres. This corresponds to the small-angle definition of the parsec found in many astronomical references.

== History and derivation ==
Imagining an elongated right triangle in space, where the shorter leg measures one au (astronomical unit, the average Earth–Sun distance) and the subtended angle of the vertex opposite that leg measures one arcsecond (1/3600 of a degree), the parsec is defined as the length of the adjacent leg. The value of a parsec can be derived through the rules of trigonometry. It is the distance from Earth whereupon the radius of its solar orbit subtends one arcsecond.

One of the oldest methods used by astronomers to calculate the distance to a star is to record the difference in angle between two measurements of the position of the star in the sky. The first measurement is taken from the Earth on one side of the Sun, and the second is taken approximately half a year later, when the Earth is on the opposite side of the Sun. (Note: Terrestrial observations of a star's position should be taken when the Earth is at the furthest points in its orbit from a line between the Sun and the star, in order to form a right angle at the Sun and a full au of separation as viewed from the star.) The distance between the two positions of the Earth when the two measurements were taken is twice the distance between the Earth and the Sun. The difference in angle between the two measurements is twice the parallax angle, which is formed by lines from the Sun and Earth to the star at the distant vertex. Then the distance to the star could be calculated using trigonometry. The first successful published direct measurements of an object at interstellar distances were undertaken by German astronomer Friedrich Wilhelm Bessel in 1838, who used this approach to calculate the 3.5-parsec distance of 61 Cygni.

Stellar parallax motion from annual parallax

The parallax of a star is defined as half of the angular distance that a star appears to move relative to the celestial sphere as Earth orbits the Sun. Equivalently, it is the subtended angle, from that star's perspective, of the semimajor axis of the Earth's orbit. Substituting the star's parallax for the one arcsecond angle in the imaginary right triangle, the long leg of the triangle will measure the distance from the Sun to the star. A parsec can be defined as the length of the right triangle side adjacent to the vertex occupied by a star whose parallax angle is one arcsecond.

The use of the parsec as a unit of distance follows naturally from Bessel's method, because the distance in parsecs can be computed simply as the reciprocal of the parallax angle in arcseconds (i.e.: if the parallax angle is 1 arcsecond, the object is 1 pc from the Sun; if the parallax angle is 0.5 arcseconds, the object is 2 pc away; etc.). No trigonometric functions are required in this relationship because the very small angles involved mean that the approximate solution of the skinny triangle can be applied.

Though it may have been used before, the term parsec was first mentioned in an astronomical publication in 1913. Astronomer Royal Frank Watson Dyson expressed his concern for the need of a name for that unit of distance. He proposed the name astron, but mentioned that Carl Charlier had suggested siriometer and Herbert Hall Turner had proposed parsec. It was Turner's proposal that stuck.

=== Calculating the value of a parsec ===
By the 2015 definition, the circumference of a circle with radius equal to one parsec has a total length of $360 \times 60 \times 60$ au, making 1 au equal to an arcsecond of that circumference. That is,
$$\begin{align}2\pi \text{ pc} &= 360 \times 60 \times 60 \text{ au} \\
\text{ pc} &= \frac{1 \text{ au} }{2 \pi / (360 \times 60 \times 60)} = \frac{648{,}000}{\pi} \text{ au} \\
&\approx 206{,}264.8 \text{ au} \approx 30{,}856{,}775{,}814{,}913{,}673 \text{ metres}\end{align}$$
using the definition 1 au = 149597870700 m.

The length of the parsec used in IAU 2015 Resolution B2 is larger than the previous definition that is based upon the tangent of the angle measured in radians,
$$\mathrm{~pc}_{2012} = \frac{1 \text{ au}}{\tan [2\pi / (360 \times 60 \times 60)]}\,,$$
by about 240 km, i.e.: only after the 11th significant figure.

== Usage and measurement ==
The parallax method is the fundamental calibration step for distance determination in astrophysics; however, the accuracy of ground-based telescope measurements of parallax angle is limited to about 0.01″, and thus to stars no more than 100 pc distant. This is because the Earth's atmosphere limits the sharpness of a star's image, blurring the almost-point into a seeing disc whose position can only be measured approximately. Space-based telescopes are not limited by this effect and can accurately measure distances to objects beyond the limit of ground-based observations. Between 1989 and 1993, the Hipparcos satellite, launched by the European Space Agency (ESA), measured parallaxes for about 100000 stars with an astrometric precision of about 0.97 mas, and obtained accurate measurements for stellar distances of stars up to 1000 pc away.

ESA's Gaia satellite, which launched on 19 December 2013, gathered data with a goal of measuring one billion stellar distances to within 20 microarcseconds, producing errors of 10% in measurements as far as the Galactic Centre, about 8000 pc away in the constellation of Sagittarius.

== Distances in parsecs ==
=== Distances less than a parsec ===
Distances expressed in fractions of a parsec usually involve objects within a single star system. So, for example:

- One astronomical unit (au), the distance from the Sun to the Earth, is just under 5×10^{−6} pc.
- The most distant space probe, Voyager 1, was 0.0007897 pc from Earth as of February 2024. Voyager 1 took 46 years to cover that distance.
- The Oort cloud is estimated to be approximately 0.6 pc in diameter.

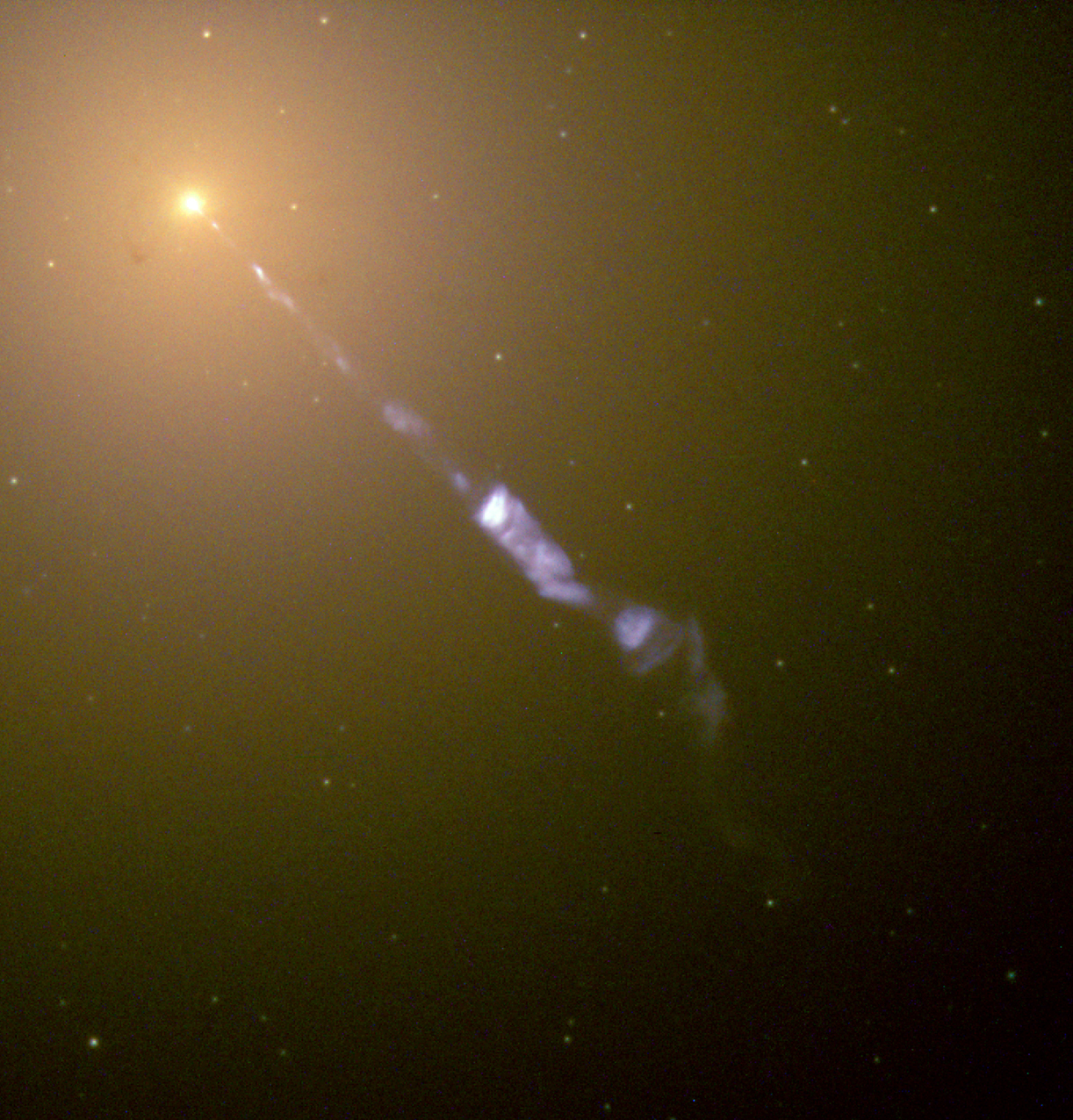
As observed by the Hubble Space Telescope, the astrophysical jet erupting from the active galactic nucleus of M87 subtends 20″ and is thought to be 1.5 kiloparsecs (4,892 ly) long (the jet is somewhat foreshortened from Earth's perspective).

=== Parsecs and kiloparsecs ===
Distances expressed in parsecs (pc) include distances between nearby stars, such as those in the same spiral arm or globular cluster. A distance of 1,000 parsecs (3,262 ly) is denoted by the kiloparsec (kpc). Astronomers typically use kiloparsecs to express distances between parts of a galaxy or within groups of galaxies. So, for example:

- Proxima Centauri, the nearest known star to Earth other than the Sun, is about 1.3 parsecs (4.24 ly) away by direct parallax measurement.
- The distance to the open cluster Pleiades is 130±10 pc (420±30 ly) from us per Hipparcos parallax measurement.
- The centre of the Milky Way is more than 8 kiloparsecs (26,000 ly) from the Earth and the Milky Way is roughly 34 kiloparsecs (110,000 ly) across.
- ESO 383-76, one of the largest known galaxies, has a diameter of 540.9 kpc (1.8 million ly).
- The Andromeda Galaxy (M31) is about 780 kpc (2.5 million ly) away from the Earth.

=== Megaparsecs and gigaparsecs ===
Astronomers typically express the distances between neighboring galaxies and galaxy clusters in megaparsecs (Mpc). A megaparsec is one million parsecs, or about 3.26 million light years. Sometimes, galactic distances are given in units of Mpc/h (as in "50/h Mpc", also written "50 Mpc h^{−1}"). h is a constant (the "dimensionless Hubble constant") in the range 0.5 < h < 0.75 reflecting the uncertainty in the value of the Hubble constant H for the rate of expansion of the universe: h = H/(100 (km/s)/Mpc). The Hubble constant becomes relevant when converting an observed redshift z into a distance d using the formula d ≈ c/H × z.

One gigaparsec (Gpc) is one billion parsecs — one of the largest units of length commonly used. One gigaparsec is about 3.26 billion ly, or roughly 1/14 of the distance to the horizon of the observable universe (indicated by the cosmic microwave background radiation). Astronomers typically use gigaparsecs to express the sizes of large-scale structures such as the size of, and distance to, the CfA2 Great Wall; the distances between galaxy clusters; and the distance to quasars.

For example:

- The Andromeda Galaxy is about 0.78 Mpc (2.5 million ly) from the Earth.
- The nearest large galaxy cluster, the Virgo Cluster, is about 16.5 Mpc (54 million ly) from the Earth.
- The galaxy RXJ1242-11, observed to have a supermassive black hole core similar to the Milky Way's, is about 200 Mpc (650 million ly) from the Earth.
- The galaxy filament Hercules–Corona Borealis Great Wall, which is since November 2013 the largest known structure in the universe, is about 3 Gpc (9.8 billion ly) across.
- The particle horizon (the boundary of the observable universe) has a radius of about 14 Gpc (46 billion ly).

== Volume units ==
To determine the number of stars in the Milky Way, volumes in cubic kiloparsecs (Note: 1 pc^{3} / ≈ 2.938×10^{49} m^{3}; 1 kpc^{3} / ≈ 2.938×10^{58} m^{3}; 1 Mpc^{3} / ≈ 2.938×10^{67} m^{3}; 1 Gpc^{3} / ≈ 2.938×10^{76} m^{3}; 1 Tpc^{3} / ≈ 2.938×10^{85} m^{3}) (kpc^{3}) are selected in various directions. All the stars in these volumes are counted and the total number of stars statistically determined. The number of globular clusters, dust clouds, and interstellar gas is determined in a similar fashion. To determine the number of galaxies in superclusters, volumes in cubic megaparsecs (Mpc^{3}) are selected. All the galaxies in these volumes are classified and tallied. The total number of galaxies can then be determined statistically. The huge Boötes Void is measured in cubic megaparsecs.

In physical cosmology, volumes of cubic gigaparsecs (Gpc^{3}) are selected to determine the distribution of matter in the visible universe and to determine the number of galaxies and quasars. The Sun is currently the only star in its cubic parsec, (pc^{3}) but in globular clusters the stellar density could be from 100–1000 pc^{−3}.

The observational volume of gravitational wave interferometers (e.g., LIGO, Virgo) is stated in terms of cubic megaparsecs (Mpc^{3}) and is essentially the value of the effective distance cubed.

== See also ==
- Attoparsec
- Distance measure

== In popular culture ==
The parsec is used incorrectly as a measurement of time by Han Solo in the first Star Wars film, when he claims that his ship, the Millennium Falcon, "made the Kessel Run in less than 12 parsecs," originally with the intention of presenting Solo as "something of a bull artist who didn't always know precisely what he was talking about." The claim is repeated in The Force Awakens. In Solo: A Star Wars Story, it is stated that the Millennium Falcon has traveled a shorter distance (as opposed to a quicker time) due to a more dangerous route through the Kessel Run, enabled by its speed and maneuverability. It is also used incorrectly in The Mandalorian.
