= Édouard Montpetit =

Canadian writer (1881–1954)

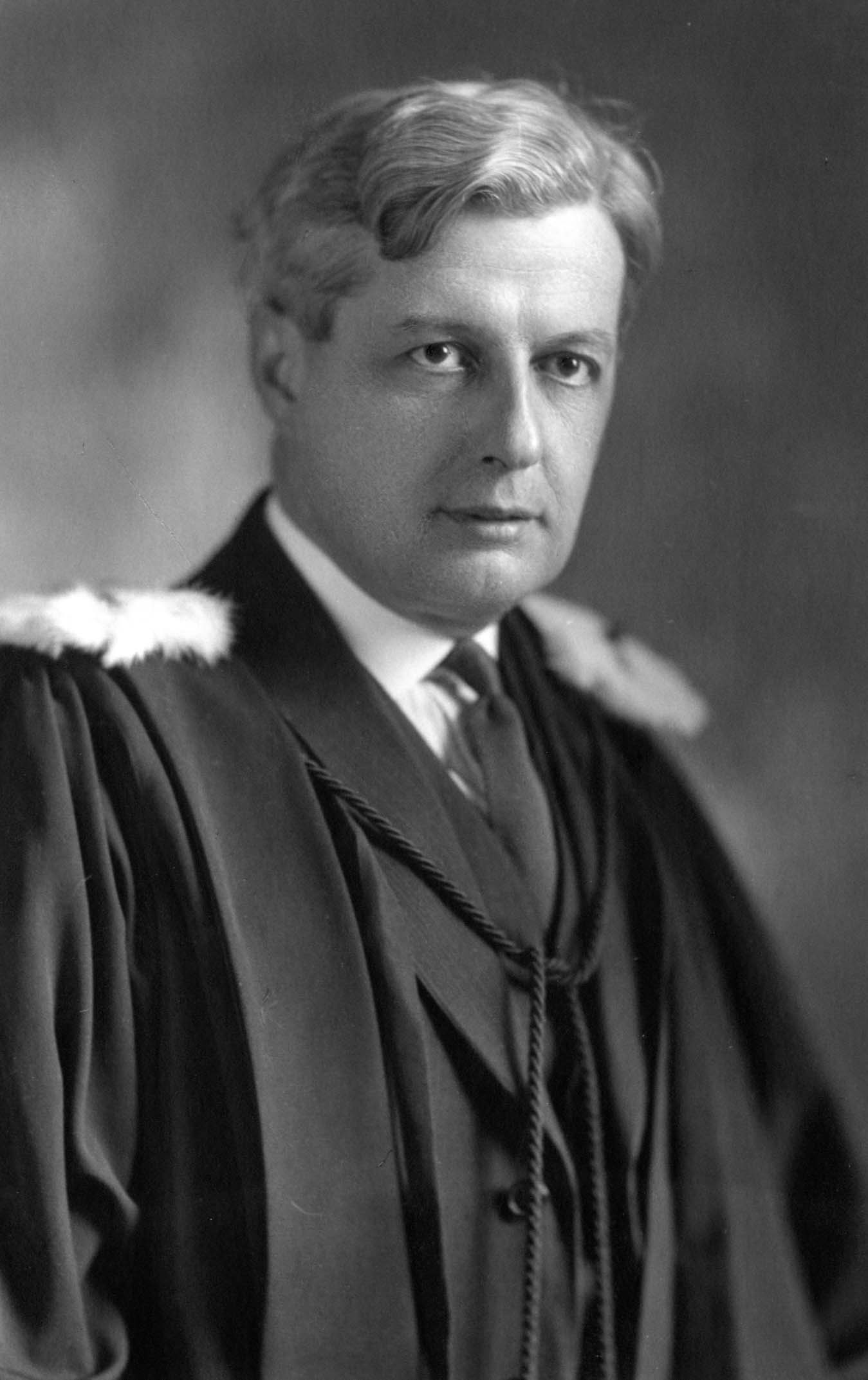
- Montpetit in 1927
- Born: 26 September 1881; Montmagny, Quebec, Canada
- Died: 27 May 1954 (aged 72)
- Occupations: Lawyer, economist, academic

Édouard Montpetit (French pronunciation: [edwaʁ mɔ̃pəti]; 26 September 1881 – 27 May 1954) was a Quebec lawyer, economist and academic.

== Biography ==
Montpetit was born on 26 September 1881 in Montmagny, Quebec. Called to the bar in 1904, Montpetit worked as a lawyer and taught political economy before he obtained a scholarship in 1907, which made him the first holder of such a scholarship to be officially sent by the province of Quebec to Paris. In Paris he studied political and social science, receiving a degree in both. He founded the École des sciences sociales in 1920, which he then ran. In 1922 Prime Minister William Lyon Mackenzie King named him, with the industrialist Sir Charles Gordon, as one of Canada's two delegates to the Genoa Conference on the economic reconstruction of Europe.

Between 1920 and 1950 he was active at the Université de Montréal, where he was secretary general, dean of the faculty of social sciences, member of the senate and member of the board of direction. He taught at the business school affiliated with the Université de Montréal, the École des hautes études commerciales (HEC) from 1910 to 1939, as well as at the university's law school, from 1910 to his death. He died on 27 May 1954 and was entombed at the Notre Dame des Neiges Cemetery in Montreal.

== Recognition ==
In 1935 Montpetit was awarded the Royal Society of Canada's Lorne Pierce Medal.

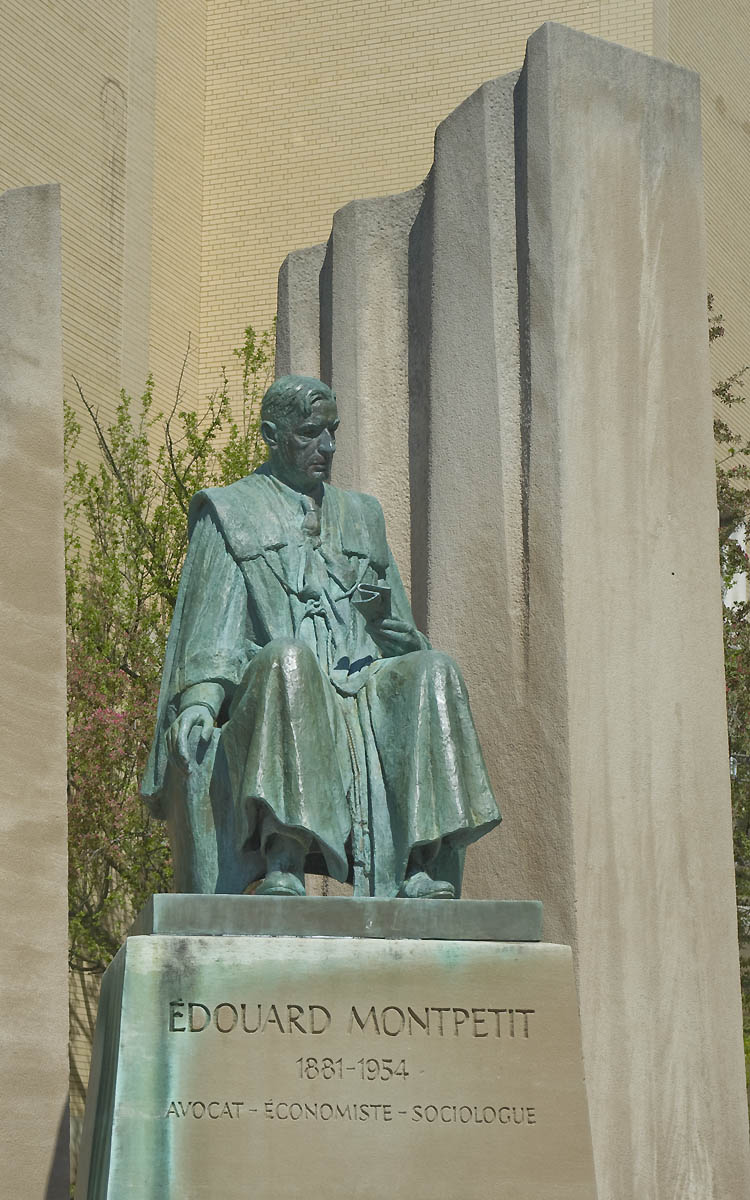
Statue of Montpetit by Sylvia Daoust on the Université de Montréal campus (1967)

In 1967, a monument to Montpetit by Sylvia Daoust was unveiled on the Université de Montréal campus and the name of nearby Maplewood Avenue in Côte-des-Neiges was changed to boulevard Édouard-Montpetit. The name of Maplewood Avenue in Outremont did not change.

A CEGEP in Longueuil, Quebec (Collège Édouard-Montpetit), a high school in the east of Montreal and a station in the Montreal metro system are also named in his honour.

== Bibliography ==
A partial list of Montpetit's published works includes:

- Au service de la tradition française (1920)
- Pour une doctrine (1931)
- Les cordons de la bourse (1935)
- Le front contre la vitre (1936)
- La conquête économique (1938–1940)
- Reflets d'Amérique (1941)
- Propos sur la montagne: Essais (1946)
