= Charlier polynomials =

Orthogonal polynomials

In mathematics, Charlier polynomials, also called Poisson–Charlier polynomials, are a family of orthogonal polynomials introduced by Carl Charlier in 1905. They are given in terms of the generalized hypergeometric function by

$$C_n(x; \mu)= {}_2F_0(-n,-x;-;-1/\mu)=(-1)^n n! L_n^{(-1-x)}(-1/\mu),$$

where $L$ are generalized Laguerre polynomials. They satisfy the following orthogonality relation in the Hilbert space of square summable sequences associated with the Poisson distribution with parameter $\mu$:

$$e^\mu\langle  C_n(\cdot,\mu),C_m(\cdot,\mu)\rangle=\sum_{x=0}^\infty \frac{\mu^x}{x!} C_n(x; \mu)C_m(x; \mu)=e^\mu\mu^{-n} n! \delta_{nm}, \quad \mu>0,$$

where $\delta_{nm}$ is the Kronecker delta. They form a Sheffer sequence related to the Poisson process, similar to how Hermite polynomials relate to Brownian motion.

Charlier polynomials have a q-analog, the q-Charlier polynomials, which are given in terms of the basic hypergeometric function by

$$C_n(q^{-x};a;q) = {}_2\phi_1(q^{-n},q^{-x};0;q,-q^{n+1}/a).$$

== See also ==
- Wilson polynomials, a generalization of Charlier polynomials.
