= Mesnil-Saint-Loup =

Commune in Grand Est, France

- Commune
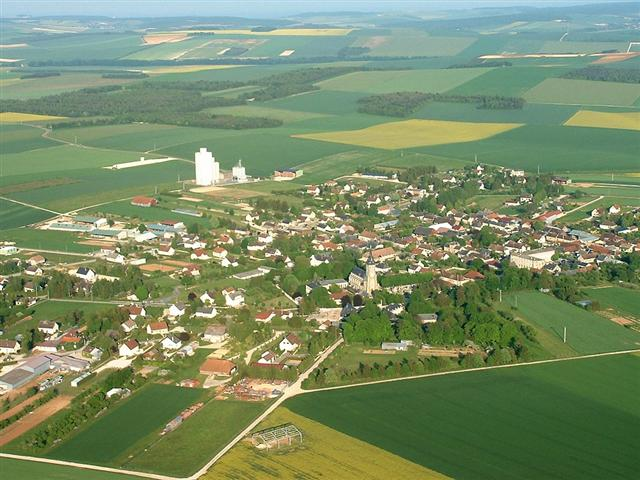
- A general view of Mesnil-Saint-Loup

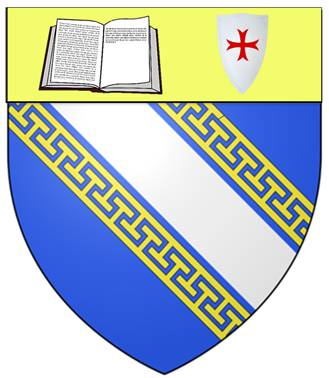
- Coat of arms
- Location of Mesnil-Saint-Loup
- Location within France Location within Grand Est
- Coordinates: 48°18′08″N 3°45′58″E
- Country: France
- Region: Grand Est
- Department: Aube
- Arrondissement: Nogent-sur-Seine
- Canton: Saint-Lyé
- Intercommunality: Orvin et Ardusson

Government
  - Mayor (2020–2026): Michaël Simon
- Area^{1}: 11.4 km^{2} (4.4 sq mi)
- Elevation: 165 m (541 ft)
- Population (2023): 579
  - Density: 50.8/km^{2} (132/sq mi)
- Time zone: UTC+01:00 (CET)
  - Summer (DST): UTC+02:00 (CEST)
- INSEE/Postal code: 10237 /10190
- ^{1} French Land Register data, which excludes lakes, ponds, glaciers > 1 km^{2} (0.386 sq mi or 247 acres) and river estuaries.

Mesnil-Saint-Loup (French pronunciation: [mɛnil sɛ̃ lu]) is a commune in the Aube department in north-central France.

== Population ==
Historical population
Year	Pop.	±% p.a.
1968	462	—
1975	480	+0.55%
1982	498	+0.53%
1990	507	+0.22%
1999	523	+0.35%
2007	539	+0.38%
2012	587	+1.72%
2017	600	+0.44%
2023	579	−0.59%
Source: INSEE

== See also ==
- Communes of the Aube department
