= Joseph Charlier =

- Born: 20 June 1816; Brussels, Belgium
- Died: 6 December 1896 (aged 80); Brussels, Belgium
- Occupations: accountant, jurist, merchant, writer

Joseph Charlier (20 June 1816 – 6 December 1896) was a Belgian self-described jurist, writer, accountant, and merchant. He was one of the earliest proponents of a citizen's income or guaranteed minimum income, preceding even the "state bonus" scheme published by British Dennis Milner (1892–1956) in 1920.

Charlier was influenced by Charles Fourier. According to John Stuart Mill, Fourierism required that "in the distribution, a certain minimum is first assigned for the subsistence of every member of the community, whether capable or not of labour." Fourier and his foremost disciple Victor Prosper Considérant criticized civilization for failing to provide a minimum to the poor, but feared widespread idleness and a collapsing civilization if workers previously depending on "repugnant" labor for income had a choice. Considérant, in some of his writings, suggested that society guarantee a right to work in order to compensate them for denying equal access to natural resources. ("La condition sine quâ non-pour la Légitimité de la Propriété est donc que la Société reconnaisse au Prolétaire le droit au travail et qu’elle lui assure au moins autant de moyens de subsistance, pour un exercice d’activité donné, que cet exercice eût pu lui en procurer dans l’État primitif.")

Charlier agreed with Fourierism that the central problem was the improvement of the condition of the disinherited classes ("amélioration du sort des classes déshéritées"). He rejected "the right to assistance", a solution addressing effects rather than the cause, and the "right to work/organization of labor" which he expected to result in an extension of state control. Instead, Charlier proposed a scheme with a basic income paid unconditionally to every member of society, regardless of need or ability to work.

In 1896 at age 80, Charlier died at Brussels where he was born.

== Writings by Charlier (selection) ==
Essai de Joseph Charlier sur le droit au revenu universel

- Solution du problème social ou constitution humanitaire, basée sur la loi naturelle, et précédée de l’exposé de motifs (1848)
- Catéchisme populaire, philosophique, politique et social (1871)
- La question sociale résolue précédée du testament philosophique d’un penseur (1894)
- L’anarchie désarmée par l’équité: Corollaire à la question sociale résolue (1894)
