= Carl Charlier =

Swedish astronomer (1862–1934)

Carl Vilhelm Ludwig Charlier
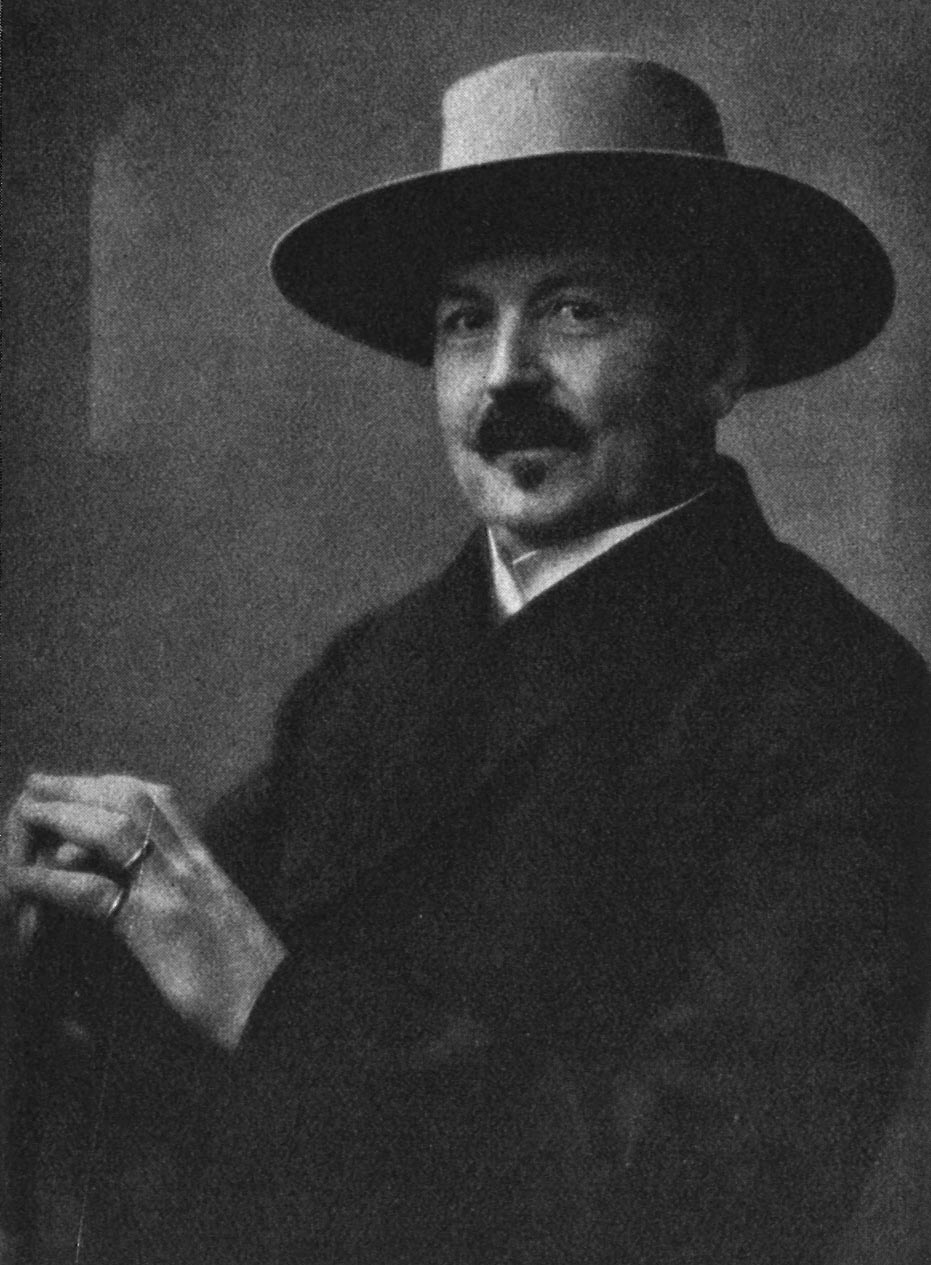
- Professor Carl Charlier in 1923.
- Born: 1 April 1862; Östersund, Sweden
- Died: 4 November 1934 (aged 72); Lund, Sweden
- Known for: Charlier polynomials Charlier universe Gram–Charlier A series Siriometer
- Awards: Bruce Medal (1933); James Craig Watson Medal (1924)

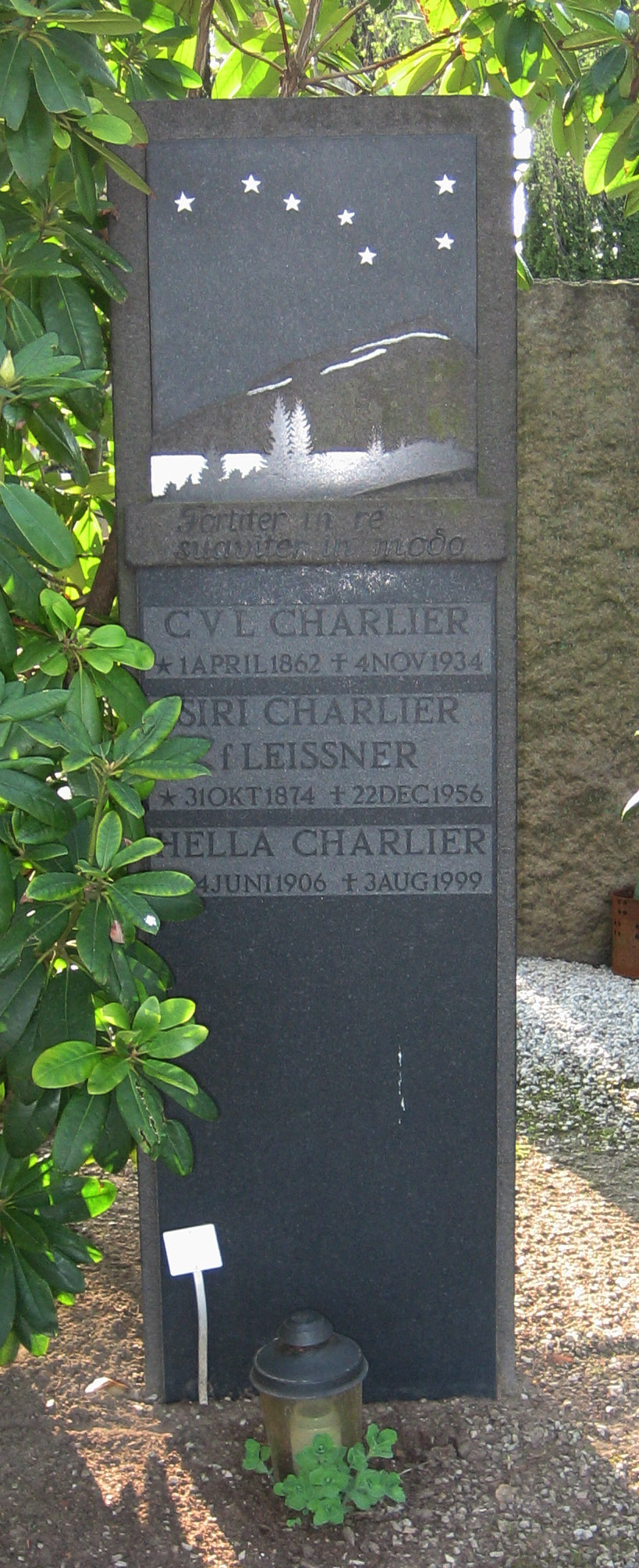
Grave of Carl Charlier in Lund, Sweden.

Carl Vilhelm Ludwig Charlier (1 April 1862 – 4 November 1934) was a Swedish astronomer. In mathematics, Charlier polynomials and Gram–Charlier A series are named after him.

== Career ==
Charlier was born in Östersund. His parents were Emmerich Emanuel and Aurora Kristina (née Hollstein) Charlier.

He received his Ph.D. from Uppsala University in 1887, later worked there and at the Stockholm Observatory and was Professor of Astronomy and Director of the Observatory at Lund University from 1897.

He made extensive statistical studies of the stars in our galaxy and their positions and motions, and tried to develop a model of the galaxy based on this. He proposed the siriometer as a unit of stellar distance.

Charlier was also interested in pure statistics and played a role in the development of statistics in Swedish academia. Several of his pupils became statisticians, working at universities and in government and companies.

Related to his work on galactic structure, he also developed a cosmological theory in 1902. In the resulting Charlier hierarchical cosmology, increasingly large areas of space contain decreasing densities of matter, the principle being introduced to avoid the observational inconsistency that would otherwise emerge from Olbers's paradox and Seeliger's paradox. This model became a widely popular alternative to Einstein's cosmological models until the 1930s.

Late in his career, he translated Isaac Newton's Principia into Swedish. He died in Lund, aged 72.

== Honours and awards ==
He received various prizes during his life, including:

- James Craig Watson Medal (1924)
- Bruce Medal (1933)

A lunar crater and a Mars crater are named "Charlier" after him. A minor asteroid was named 8677 Charlier, also named after him.

== Publications ==
- Carl Ludwig Charlier: Die Mechanik des Himmels, 1902–1907, Leipzig: Veit, (2 volumes) (2nd edition in 1927)
- Lectures on Stellar Statistics. Charlier. 1921

== Bibliography ==
- Gustav Holmberg, Reaching for the Stars: Studies in the History of Swedish Stellar and Nebular Astronomy, 1860-1940 (Lund, 1999)
- Gustav Holmberg, "C.V.L. Charlier", in Hockey, Thomas (2009). The Biographical Encyclopedia of Astronomers. Springer Publishing. ISBN 978-0-387-31022-0. Archived from the original on January 13, 2014.
