= Claude Vermette =

Canadian ceramist and painter

- Born: August 10, 1930; Montreal, Quebec, Canada
- Died: April 21, 2006 (aged 75); Sainte-Agathe-des-Monts, Quebec, Canada
- Known for: Ceramicist, painter, sculptor
- Spouse: Mariette Rousseau-Vermette

Claude Vermette RCA (August 10, 1930 – April 21, 2006) was a Canadian ceramist and painter. He was born in Montreal, Quebec and died in Sainte-Agathe-des-Monts. He was an artist with an international reputation, and he made important contributions to the ceramic arts in Canada, especially in architectural ceramics, where he is considered a pioneer.

== Biography ==
As a ceramist who worked in the architectural field, Claude Vermette was a pioneer in Canada bringing color in spaces that were often grey and frigid.

=== Studies ===
A lifelong resident of Montreal, Claude Vermette studied art under the guidance of Brother Jerome, c.s.c. at Notre-Dame College while also attending the Collège Saint-Laurent and the college of the Clercs de Saint-Viateur for his academic studies. Through his contact with Brother Jerome, he met Paul-Émile Borduas and joined the Automatiste group of emerging artists. He was considered too young by Borduas to sign the 1948 "Refus Global" (Global denial), but he was present at the launch of this manifesto, which was destined to become famous in Québec's contemporary history. Drawing, painting and ceramics were then his main modes of expression.

=== Formative years ===
His first exhibitions in 1948, 1950 and 1952 caused him to be noticed by art critics who praised his talent and perceived the promise a bright future. In 1952, his interest in ceramics expanded during a study tour in Europe and especially in Italy where he met the architect Gio Ponti, a major player in the rebirth of modern Italian design and founder of the magazine Domus and the sculptor-ceramist Fausto Melotti. Another decisive encounter is that of the Finnish architect, Alvar Aalto.

Thereafter, Claude Vermette concentrated his efforts on architectural ceramics for which he created new forms of composition for the clay, a wider variety of modules for tiles and bricks, and new patented enamels. All these innovations resulted in much appreciation regarding the quality and sustainability of his ceramics, notably in the context of the Canadian climate and its gruelling winters. His bricks and tiles also earned him the 1962 first prize for industrial design.

=== Architectural ceramic ===
In 1953, the then 23 years old artist produced his first great work in ceramics: the huge background of the main altar and the whole ceiling of the new chapel of the Seminary of Chicoutimi. There followed a career of twenty-five years as ceramist characterized by close collaboration with architects and engineers, during which he produced large works in more than a hundred public buildings, including pavilions and buildings connected to the Montreal World's Fair in 1967, at Osaka in 1970, at the 1976 Summer Olympics held in Montreal as well as in many schools, churches, courthouses (including those in Montreal, St-Hyacinthe and at Percé in the Gaspé Peninsula ), hospitals (including those of Notre-Dame and Marie-Enfant in Montréal, and Amos in Abitibi), universities (including that of Montréal, McGill, Laval and Sherbrooke), government buildings, airports (Pierre Elliott Trudeau, Mirabel and Molton), in more than a dozen Montreal metro stations (including Saint-Laurent, Peel, Berri-UQAM, Laurier) and other buildings, including those of General Motors in New York City, MacMillan Bloedel in Vancouver, Bell Canada in Toronto, Canadian National, Canadian Pacific, Texaco Canada and Quebecor to name a few more. He also created many works, such as ceramic fireplaces mantles and wall murals for private mansions.

In the Montreal metro, his work was not originally acknowledged as works of art; however, the Société de transport de Montréal now lists his murals at Saint-Laurent and Berri–UQAM among the metro system's artworks, while acknowledging his contributions to the ceramics at other stations, including creating the ceramics used in other artists' works such as at Peel and De l'Église.

His works are also found in museums, including the Montreal Museum of Fine Arts and the Musée national des beaux-arts du Québec.

=== Engravings, watercolours and paintings ===
Claude Vermette also felt the need to pursue research that initially evolved into the creation of small-scale ceramic works where he experimented with new forms, textures and glazes and later also included engravings, sculptures and especially painting. He was further distinguished by mastery in engraving, taking advantage of relief materials that linked the play of light: evidenced by its white on white prints and art book Blanc-Seeing when it operates in its many variations, the latter accompanied by texts by the poet Eugene Cloutier. These prints have inspired the realization of small sculptures.

The artist uses his experiences as game textures, reliefs and light of his prints into white concrete works, thereby making the building for the Caisse populaire Laurier in Ottawa a dozen bas-reliefs of white concrete, large and small dimensions, varying textures, thicknesses and relief printed to the material.

Vermette was also interested in creating watercolor works of all sizes such as, among them, a giant mural of over 80 meters long at Bell Trinity Square Office in Toronto. Another book of art is born, Gestes de Liberté, this time in collaboration with the economist, André Raynauld. Art and science! This challenge of uniting the work of a painter and that of an economist is reflected in the execution of this book which includes an abstract watercolor where dominate color and movement and a series of nine articles on the theme of freedom.

=== Last years ===
In the last thirty years of his life, Claude Vermette devoted most of his activity to painting. His works has been exhibited in Canada and abroad and is represented in the collections of public institutions, large corporations as well as private collections.

At the time of his death, he had just finished replacing the five exterior aluminium enameled murals he had created for the walls of the Beaver Lake Pavilion on Mount-Royal in Montréal, which were initially made in ceramic in 1958 and were unfortunately victims of demolition. This historic pavilion was renovated by the City of Montreal and inaugurated in January 2006. To mark the quality of the achievement, the City was awarded the Orange Prize 2006 by the organization Sauvons Montreal in category "Intervention heritage.

He was the husband of the artist Mariette Rousseau-Vermette, tapestry weaver who, by the aesthetic and technical qualities of the tapestries and the impressive number of monumental works, has earned an international reputation. The couple who had two children lived in Ste-Adele. Both had a professional art career that spans over a period of sixty years.

== Bibliography ==
- Claude-Vermette Studio, Personal Archives, years 1946-2006 and C.V.
- Au vernissage d'un peintre de 16 ans, La Presse, 3 juin 1947, 1ère colonne
- Un artiste est né, Le Petit Journal, 27 janvier 1952, p. 51, 5ème colonne
- Irene Kon, Claude Vermette, Canadian Art, November 1960, p.p. 359- 363
- Les travaux d'un jeune artiste québécois seront l'objet d'un hommage spécial à San Francisco, La Presse, samedi, 14 mai 1960, p. 36
- Michel Lapalme, Une nouvelle industrie: celle de la beauté, Le magazine Maclean, novembre 1969, vol.9, no.11, p. 52-55
- René Viau, Claude Vermette et la céramique architecturale, Décormag, avril 1978, p. 74-78
- Industrial Crafts, Claude Vermette, Canadian Art, March–April 1961, no.72
- Rosalind Pepall, L'oiseau d'or de Claude Vermette - Un bijou d'acquisition, Collage, Musée des Beaux-Arts de Montréal, automne 1998, p. 16
