= Julien Hébert =

- Born: August 19, 1917; Rigaud, Quebec, Canada
- Died: May 24, 1994 (aged 76); Montreal, Quebec, Canada
- Occupation: Architect
- Buildings: Place-Saint-Henri (Montreal Metro); Canada Pavilion, Expo '70
- Projects: Expo 67 Logo

Julien Hébert (French pronunciation: [ʒyljɛ̃ ebɛʁ]; August 19, 1917 – May 24, 1994) was a Québécois industrial designer, perhaps most famous for creating the logo of the Montreal World Exposition, Expo 67.

Formerly a student of philosophy, Hébert began his design education as a student of sculpture at the École des Beaux-Arts de Montréal, continuing in 1947 in Paris under Ossip Zadkine. Hébert later became a teacher himself, teaching art history and sculpture at his alma mater, the École des beaux-arts, and instructing in planning and design at the École du meuble. He went on to assist in the establishment of the École du design industriel at the University of Montreal. . Earlier in his career he was also active as a comics artist. His best known series was Mouchette.

In 1979, Hébert was awarded the Prix Paul-Émile-Borduas by the Québécois Government.
