= Thomas Digges =

English mathematician and astronomer (died 1595)

- Born: c. 1546; Wootton, Kent, England
- Died: 24 August 1595; London, England
- Known for: Proposing that the universe is infinite in extent
- Scientific career
- Fields: Astronomer and mathematician
- Academic advisors: John Dee

Notes
- Son of Leonard Digges, and father of Dudley Digges and Leonard Digges (II)

Thomas Digges (/dɪɡz/; c. 1546 – 24 August 1595) was an English mathematician and astronomer. He was the first to expound the Copernican system in English but discarded the notion of a fixed shell of immoveable stars to postulate infinitely many stars at varying distances. He was also first to postulate the "dark night sky paradox".

== Life ==
Thomas Digges, born about 1546, was the son of Leonard Digges (c. 1515 – c. 1559), the mathematician and surveyor, and Bridget Wilford, the daughter of Thomas Wilford, esquire, of Hartridge in Cranbrook, Kent, by his first wife, Elizabeth Culpeper, the daughter of Walter Culpeper, esquire. Digges had two brothers, James and Daniel, and three sisters, Mary, who married a man with the surname of Barber; Anne, who married William Digges; and Sarah, whose first husband was surnamed Martin, and whose second husband was John Weston.

After the death of his father, Digges grew up under the guardianship of John Dee, a typical Renaissance natural philosopher. In 1583, Lord Burghley appointed Digges, with John Chamber and Henry Savile, to sit on a commission to consider whether England should adopt the Gregorian calendar, as proposed by Dee.

Digges served as a member of parliament for Wallingford and also had a military career as a Muster-Master General to the English forces from 1586 to 1594 during the war with the Spanish Netherlands. In his capacity of Master-Muster General he was instrumental in promoting improvements at the Port of Dover.

Digges died on 24 August 1595. His last will, in which he specifically excluded both his brother, James Digges, and William Digges, was proved on 1 September. Digges was buried in the chancel of the church of St Mary Aldermanbury, London.

== Marriage and issue ==
Digges married Anne St Leger (1555–1636), daughter of Sir Warham St Leger and his first wife, Ursula Neville (d. 1575), the fifth daughter of George Neville, 5th Baron Bergavenny, by his third wife, Mary Stafford. In his will he named two surviving sons, Sir Dudley Digges (1583–1639), politician and statesman, and Leonard Digges (1588–1635), poet, and two surviving daughters, Margaret and Ursula. After Digges's death, his widow, Anne, married Thomas Russell of Alderminster in Warwickshire, "whom in 1616 William Shakespeare named as an overseer of his will".

== Work ==
Digges attempted to determine the parallax of the 1572 supernova observed by Tycho Brahe, and concluded it had to be beyond the orbit of the Moon. This contradicted Aristotle's view of the universe, according to which no change could take place among the fixed stars.

In 1576, he published a new edition of his father's perpetual almanac, A Prognostication everlasting. The text written by Leonard Digges for the third edition of 1556 was left unchanged, but Thomas added new material in several appendices. The most important of these was A Perfit Description of the Caelestiall Orbes according to the most aunciente doctrine of the Pythagoreans, latelye revived by Copernicus and by Geometricall Demonstrations approved. Contrary to the Ptolemaic cosmology of the original book by his father, the appendix featured a detailed discussion of the controversial and still poorly known Copernican heliocentric model of the Universe. This was the first publication of that model in English, and a milestone in the popularisation of science.

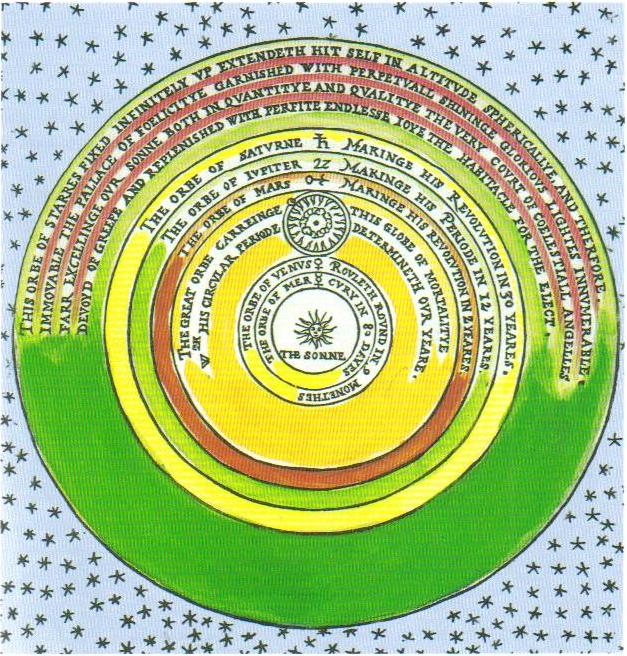
An illustration of the Copernican universe from Thomas Digges's book

For the most part, the appendix was a loose translation into English of chapters from Copernicus's book De revolutionibus orbium coelestium. Thomas Digges went further than Copernicus, however, by proposing that the universe is infinite, containing infinitely many stars, and may have been the first person to do so, predating Giordano Bruno's (1584) and William Gilbert's (1600) same views. According to Harrison:

Copernicus had said little or nothing about what lay beyond the sphere of fixed stars. Digges's original contribution to cosmology consisted of dismantling the starry sphere, and scattering the stars throughout endless space.

By grafting endless space onto the Copernican system and scattering the stars throughout this endless space, Digges pioneered ... the idea of an unlimited universe filled with the mingling rays of countless stars.

An illustration of the Copernican universe can be seen above right. The outer inscription on the map reads (after spelling adjustments from Elizabethan to Modern English):

This orb of stars fixed infinitely up extends itself in altitude spherically, and therefore immovable the palace of felicity garnished with perpetual shining glorious lights innumerable, far excelling our sun both in quantity and quality the very court of celestial angels, devoid of grief and replenished with perfect endless joy, the habitacle for the elect.

In 1583, Lord Burghley appointed Digges, along with Henry Savile (Bible translator) and John Chamber, to sit on a commission to consider whether England should adopt the Gregorian calendar, as proposed by John Dee; in fact Britain did not adopt the calendar until 1752.

== Sources and further reading ==
- Edwards, David (2004). "St Leger, Sir Warham (1525?–1597)". Oxford Dictionary of National Biography (online ed.). Oxford University Press. doi:10.1093/ref:odnb/24514. (Subscription, Wikipedia Library access or UK public library membership required.) The first edition of this text is available at Wikisource: "St. Leger, Warham" . Dictionary of National Biography. London: Smith, Elder & Co. 1885–1900.
- Johnston, Stephen (2004a). "Digges, Leonard (c.1515–c.1559)". Oxford Dictionary of National Biography (online ed.). Oxford University Press. doi:10.1093/ref:odnb/7637. (Subscription, Wikipedia Library access or UK public library membership required.) The first edition of this text is available at Wikisource: "Digges, Leonard (d.1571?)" . Dictionary of National Biography. London: Smith, Elder & Co. 1885–1900.
- Johnston, Stephen (2004b). "Digges, Thomas (c.1546–1595)". Oxford Dictionary of National Biography (online ed.). Oxford University Press. doi:10.1093/ref:odnb/7639. (Subscription, Wikipedia Library access or UK public library membership required.) The first edition of this text is available at Wikisource: "Digges, Thomas" . Dictionary of National Biography. London: Smith, Elder & Co. 1885–1900.
- Lee, Sidney, rev. Haresnape, Elizabeth (2004). "Digges, Leonard (1588–1635)". Oxford Dictionary of National Biography (online ed.). Oxford University Press. doi:10.1093/ref:odnb/7638. (Subscription, Wikipedia Library access or UK public library membership required.) The first edition of this text is available at Wikisource: "Digges, Leonard (1588-1635)" . Dictionary of National Biography. London: Smith, Elder & Co. 1885–1900.
- Mosley, Adam (2004). "Chamber, John (1546–1604)". Oxford Dictionary of National Biography (online ed.). Oxford University Press. doi:10.1093/ref:odnb/5044. (Subscription, Wikipedia Library access or UK public library membership required.)
- Richardson, Douglas (2011). Everingham, Kimball G. (ed.). Magna Carta Ancestry: A Study in Colonial and Medieval Families. Vol. I (2nd ed.). Salt Lake City. ISBN 978-1449966379.
- Text of the Perfit Description:
  - Johnson, Francis R. and Larkey, Sanford V., "Thomas Digges, the Copernican System and the idea of the Infinity of the Universe in 1576," Huntington Library Bulletin 5 (1934): 69–117.
  - Harrison, Edward Robert (1987) Darkness at Night. Harvard University Press: 211–17. An abridgement of the preceding.
  - Internet version at Dartmouth retrieved on 2 November 2013
- Gribbin, John, 2002. Science: A History. Penguin.
- Johnson, Francis R., Astronomical Thought in Renaissance England: A Study of the English Scientific Writings from 1500 to 1645, Johns Hopkins Press, 1937.
- Kugler, Martin Astronomy in Elizabethan England, 1558 to 1585: John Dee, Thomas Digges, and Giordano Bruno, Montpellier: Université Paul Valéry, 1982.
- Vickers, Brian (ed.), Occult & Scientific Mentalities in the Renaissance. Cambridge: Cambridge University Press, 1984. ISBN 0-521-25879-0
