= Bauschinger =

Bauschinger may refer to:

- Bauschinger (surname)
- Bauschinger effect, named after Johann Bauschinger
- 2306 Bauschinger (1939 PM), a main-belt asteroid discovered in 1939, named after Julius Bauschinger
