= Bauschinger (surname) =

Bauschinger is a German surname. Notable people of this name include the following:

- Johann Bauschinger (1834–1893), German mathematician and engineer; eponym of the Bauschinger effect
- Julius Bauschinger (1860–1934), German astronomer; son of Johann; 2306 Bauschinger (1939 PM), a main-belt asteroid discovered in 1939, was named after him
