= 251 Sophia =

Main-belt asteroid

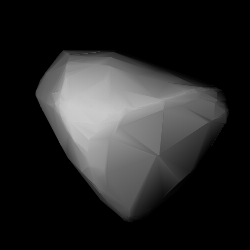
- Modelled shape of Sophia from its lightcurve

Discovery
- Discovered by: J. Palisa
- Discovery site: Vienna Obs.
- Discovery date: 4 October 1885

Designations
- Pronunciation: German: [zoːˈfiːaː]
- Named after: Sophia von Seeliger; (Hugo von Seeliger)
- Alternative designations: A885 TA, 1907 UA; 1950 RH_{1}, 1953 FN_{1}
- Minor planet category: main-belt · (outer); background

Orbital characteristics
- Epoch 31 May 2020 (JD 2459000.5)
- Uncertainty parameter 0
- Observation arc: 134.29 yr (49,050 d)
- Aphelion: 3.4015 AU
- Perihelion: 2.8035 AU
- Semi-major axis: 3.1025 AU
- Eccentricity: 0.0964
- Orbital period (sidereal): 5.46 yr (1,996 d)
- Mean anomaly: 192.53°
- Mean motion: 0° 10^{m} 49.44^{s} / day
- Inclination: 10.511°
- Longitude of ascending node: 156.02°
- Argument of perihelion: 286.51°

Physical characteristics
- Mean diameter: 27.495±0.197 km; 28.42±4.5 km; 29.65±0.42 km
- Synodic rotation period: 20.216±0.008 h
- Pole ecliptic latitude: (235.0°, −52.0°) (λ_{1}/β_{1}); (47.0°, 84.0°) (λ_{2}/β_{2})
- Geometric albedo: 0.207±0.007; 0.2188±0.091; 0.234±0.042
- Spectral type: S (S3OS2-TH); Sl (S3OS2-BB); L (SDSS-MOC)
- Absolute magnitude (H): 9.9

251 Sophia is a stony background asteroid from the outer regions of the asteroid belt. It was discovered on 4 October 1885, by astronomer Johann Palisa at the Vienna Observatory in Austria. The S-type asteroid (S/L) has a rotation period of 20.2 hours and measures approximately 28 kilometers (17 miles) in diameter. It was named after Sophia von Seeliger, wife of German astronomer Hugo von Seeliger (1849–1924).

== Orbit and classification ==
Sophia is a non-family asteroid of the main belt's background population when applying the hierarchical clustering method to its proper orbital elements. It orbits the Sun in the outer asteroid belt at a distance of 2.8–3.4 AU once every 5 years and 6 months (1,996 days; semi-major axis of 3.1 AU). Its orbit has an eccentricity of 0.10 and an inclination of 11° with respect to the ecliptic. The body's observation arc begins at Vienna Observatory with its official discovery observation on 4 October 1885.

== Naming ==
This minor planet was named after Sophia von Seeliger (née Stoeltzel), wife of German astronomer Hugo von Seeliger (1849–1924) on the occasion of their marriage (A. Schnell). The naming likely took place in 1885, on the meeting of the Astronomische Gesellschaft in Geneva, Switzerland. Seeliger, who proposed the name to the discoverer, was later honored with asteroid 892 Seeligeria, discovered by Max Wolf in 1918.

== Physical characteristics ==
In the Tholen-like taxonomy of the Small Solar System Objects Spectroscopic Survey (S3OS2), Sophia is a common, stony S-type asteroid, while in the survey's Bus–Binzel (SMASS) taxonomic variant, it is an Sl-subtype, which transitions from the S-type to the uncommon L-type. In the SDSS-based taxonomy, it is an L-type asteroid

=== Rotation period and poles ===
In December 2000, a rotational lightcurve of Sophia was obtained from photometric observations by Bill Holliday in New Braunfels, Texas. Lightcurve analysis gave a well-defined rotation period of 20.216±0.008 hours with a brightness variation of 0.30±0.02 magnitude (U=3). Between 2005 and 2013, additional observations by French amateur astronomers Laurent Bernasconi, Etienne Morelle and René Roy gave a tentative period of 20.28 hours with an amplitude between 0.25 and 0.61 (U=2/2/2).

Modeled lightcurves by Josef Ďurech and Josef Hanuš, using photometric data including from the Lowell Photometric Database and from the Wide-field Infrared Survey Explorer (WISE) were published in 2018. It gave a concurring sidereal period of 20.2221±0.0002 and 20.2222±0.0001 hours, respectively. Hanuš also gave two spin axes at (235.0°, −52.0°) and (47.0°, 84.0°) in ecliptic coordinates (λ, β).

=== Diameter and albedo ===
According to the surveys carried out by the NEOWISE mission of NASA's WISE telescope, the Infrared Astronomical Satellite IRAS, and the Japanese Akari satellite, Sophia measures (27.495±0.197), (28.42±4.5) and (29.65±0.42) kilometers in diameter and its surface has an albedo of (0.234±0.042), (0.2188±0.091) and (0.207±0.007), respectively. The Collaborative Asteroid Lightcurve Link derives an albedo of 0.2377 and a diameter of 28.54 kilometers based on an absolute magnitude of 9.9. Alternative mean-diameter measurements published by the WISE team include (28.201±1.301 km) and (28.804±0.212 km) with corresponding albedos of (0.244±0.047) and (0.2205±0.0481).
