= George W. Myers =

American mathematician

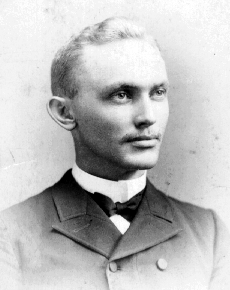
- George W. Myers in about 1888.
- Born: April 30, 1864; Champaign, Illinois, United States
- Died: November 23, 1931 (aged 67)
- Occupations: Educator, astronomer, mathematician
- Spouse: Mary Eva Sims (m. 1889)
- Children: Sarah Helen, Joseph Myers, and R. E. Lee Myers
- Parent(s): Robert Henry and Mary Helen Shawhan Myers

Academic background
- Education: B.S., 1888, University of Illinois at Urbana-Champaign; Ph.D, 1896, LMU Munich

George W. Myers (April 30, 1864 – November 23, 1931) was an American astronomer, mathematician and progressive educator. Born in Champaign Illinois, he earned his bachelor's degree in 1888 from the University of Illinois and his Ph.D. in 1896 from Ludwig-Maximilians-Universität München (LMU) in Germany under the supervision of Hugo von Seeliger.

== University of Illinois ==
George W. Myers graduated from the local University of Illinois with a degree in mathematics in 1888 and stayed as an instructor teaching both mathematics courses and the spring descriptive astronomy class. Myers along with several other mathematics professors wanted to develop an astronomy program that went beyond meeting the needs of civil engineers. To that end he worked to have the university construct a larger teaching observatory. That goal was accomplished in 1896 when the University of Illinois Observatory was complete and Myers was named director as well as Professor of Astronomy and Mathematics.

Myers conducted the first theoretical study of the eclipsing binary star Beta Lyrae as part of his dissertation. He used a light curve created by Argelander in 1859 that was based on eye estimated of the brightness of the stars. Using the light curve, he was able to describe the system of two stars almost in contact and elongated. Using A.A. Belopolsky's radial-velocity measurements, he determined the semi-major axis of the orbits and that the two stars were 21 times and 9.5 times the mass of the sun. He went further, noting the strong absorptions lines in the spectrum, to suggest that the two stars orbited within an envelope of gas. Myers first presented the results on October 20, 1897, at the opening conference for Yerkes Observatory, then published the results in the Astrophysical Journal. He identified both Beta Lyrae and Upsilon Pegasi with the piriform equilibrium figure of a rotating fluid mass discovered by Henri Poincaré in 1885, known as the Poincaré Pear.

== Mathematics education at the University of Chicago ==
Myers accepted a position as the head of the mathematics department of the Chicago Institute in 1900. Col. Parker was recruiting progressive educators with attractive salaries. The following year he was appointed Professor of Teaching of Mathematics and Astronomy at the University of Chicago where he remained until his retirement in 1929. He appeared as an associate editor of astronomy in the first issue of School Science and Mathematics and continued to serve on the editorial staff and creating more than thirty contributions. Myers was a recognized pioneer in progressive mathematics education as demonstrated by two of his books published in 1910, First Year Mathematics and Second Year Mathematics.

== Family ==
Born in Champaign to Robert Henry and Mary Helen Shawhan Myers, graduated from Urbana High School then University of Illinois. Myers married Mary Eva Sims of Urbana in 1889. He had three children, Sarah Helen Myers, Joseph Myers, and Mrs. R. E. Lee.

== See also ==
- University of Illinois Observatory
