= Friedrich Burmeister =

Friedrich Burmeister may refer to:

- Friedrich Burmeister (geophysicist)
- Friedrich Burmeister (politician)
