= John Chamber (academic) =

English writer

John Chamber (May 1546 – August 1604) was an English writer on astronomy and astrology, fellow of Merton College, Oxford, and later of Eton College, and a clergyman of the Church of England. He taught grammar, Greek, and medicine. His name is sometimes given in a Latin form as Johannes Chamberus.

== Life ==
Apart from his baptism at Swillington in Yorkshire in May 1546, nothing is known about Chamber's family or his life before Oxford. In October 1568 he graduated BA at Merton College, Oxford, and in December of the next year was elected a probationary fellow of his college. He proceeded to MA in October 1573, having already taken holy orders. In 1574, he was appointed a lecturer on grammar and gave an oration on Ptolemy's Almagest.

In 1576, he was appointed a lecturer on Greek and was also chosen as junior Linacre lecturer in medicine, a Merton College appointment which was repeated in 1579. In 1582 his life changed direction dramatically when he was elected to a fellowship at Eton and moved to Windsor, giving up his fellowship at Oxford. In 1583, Burghley appointed Chamber, with Henry Savile and Thomas Digges, to sit on a commission to consider whether England should adopt the Gregorian calendar, as proposed by John Dee, and in 1584 he applied through Merton for a licence to practise medicine.

In 1593 Chamber received the preferment of prebendary of Netherbury in Terra at Salisbury Cathedral, and in June 1601 became a canon of St George's Chapel, Windsor. He died at Eton early in August 1604, and was entombed in St George's Chapel. A memorial there (since lost) recorded that Chamber left £1,000 to Merton to endow two scholarships for boys from Eton and £50 to assist the poor of Windsor.

== Works ==
Chamber's Barlaam monachi logistice (1600), dedicated to Queen Elizabeth, was a critical translation from the Greek of Barlaam of Calabria's Logistica, dealing with the arithmetic of astronomy, which had been sent to him about 1582 by Henry Savile. This was followed by Chamber's Treatise Against Judiciall Astrologie (1601), an anti-astrological work with which was bound his Astronomiae encomium, an Oxford oration on the Almagest delivered in 1574.

His Treatise Against Judiciall Astrologie attacked the judicial form of astrology on several fronts, while saying nothing about natural astrology. He claimed that the astrologers of his day confined themselves to producing almanacs, because they were embarrassed by the many technical faults of the science of their subject. Astrology was less reliable than other kinds of divination, and only stupid people would rely on it. He asked whether an astrologer could draw up a horoscope for the eggs in a bird's nest? Christopher Heydon responded with A Defence of Judicial Astrology (1603), a ponderous work which claimed that Chamber had misunderstood those he relied on, while plagiarizing from them. Chamber responded with A confutation of astrological demonology, or, The divell's schole (1604), which exists only in a manuscript now at the Bodleian Library and may never have been published. George Carleton also responded to Heydon, with Astrologomania: The Madnesse of Astrologers, which was eventually published in 1624.
