= Karl Christian Bruhns =

German astronomer

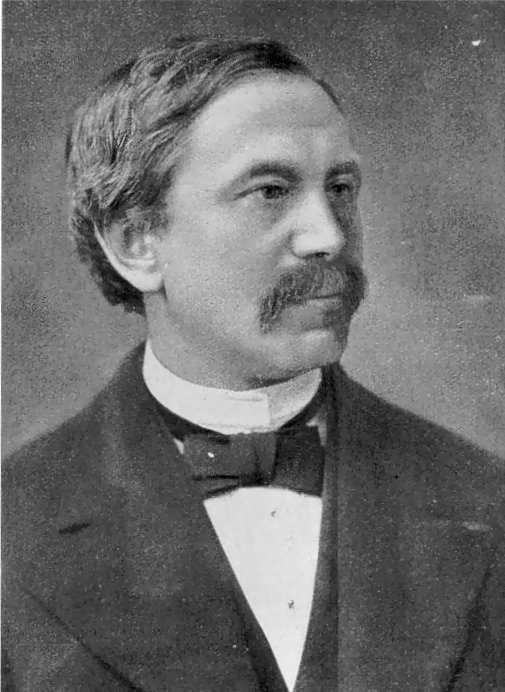
- Born: 22 November 1830; Plön, Holstein
- Died: 25 July 1881 (aged 50); Leipzig, Germany
- Awards: Lalande Prize (1857)
- Scientific career
- Doctoral advisor: Johann Franz Encke
- Doctoral students: Hugo von Seeliger, Hermann Carl Vogel

Karl Christian Bruhns (22 November 1830 – 25 July 1881) was a German astronomer.

== Biography ==
He was the son of a locksmith, and in 1851 went as locksmith and mechanic, first to Borsig, and then to Berlin with the firm of Siemens and Halske. In Berlin, he attracted the attention of Johann Encke, then director of the Berlin Observatory, by his remarkable powers as a computer. In 1852 Bruhns was appointed as assistant, and in 1854 as observer, in the Observatory, and in 1859 as instructor in the university. In 1860 he was called to the University of Leipzig as professor of astronomy and director of the new observatory to be constructed there, which, under his skilful direction, grew into one of the finest structures of its kind in Europe.

He is known as the discoverer of five comets, an able computer of cometary and planetary orbits, and for his important work in geodesy in connection with the European triangulation.
