= Cosmology =

Study of the universe

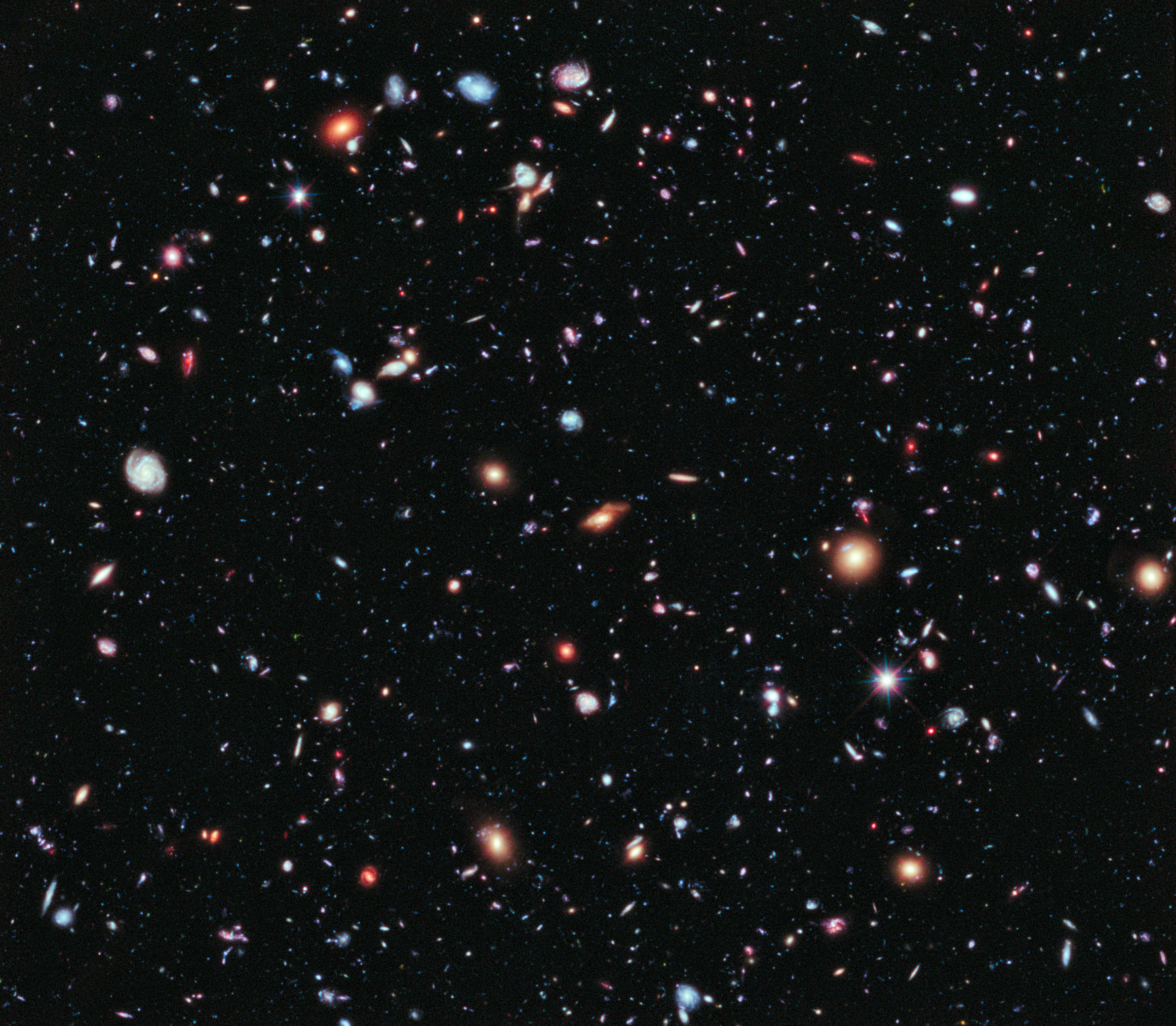
Except for the few stars in the foreground (which are bright and easily recognizable because only they have diffraction spikes), every speck of light in the composite photo is an individual galaxy, some of them as old as 13.2 billion years; the observable universe is estimated to contain more than 2 trillion galaxies. From the Hubble eXtreme Deep Field.

Cosmology (from Ancient Greek κόσμος (cosmos) 'the universe, the world' and -λογία (logia) 'study of') is the study of the nature of the universe, the cosmos. The term cosmology was first used in English in 1656 in Thomas Blount's Glossographia, with the meaning of "a speaking of the world". In 1731, German philosopher Christian Wolff used the term cosmology in Latin (cosmologia) to denote a branch of metaphysics that deals with the general nature of the physical world. Cosmology is investigated by scientists, including astronomers and physicists, as well as philosophers, such as metaphysicians, philosophers of physics, and philosophers of space and time. Because of this shared scope with philosophy, theories in cosmology may include both scientific and non-scientific propositions and may depend upon assumptions that cannot be tested. Religious or mythological cosmology is a body of beliefs based on mythological, religious, and esoteric literature and traditions of creation myths and eschatology.

In the science of astronomy, physical cosmology is concerned with the study of the chronology of the universe, the observable universe's origin, its large-scale structures and dynamics, and the ultimate fate of the universe, including the physical laws that govern these areas. Physical cosmology is a sub-branch of astronomy that is concerned with the universe as a whole. Modern physical cosmology is dominated by the Big Bang Theory which attempts to bring together observational astronomy and particle physics; more specifically, a standard parameterization of the Big Bang with dark matter and dark energy, known as the Lambda-CDM model.

Theoretical astrophysicist David N. Spergel has described cosmology as a "historical science" because "when we look out in space, we look back in time" due to the finite nature of the speed of light.

== Disciplines ==
Nature timeline
← / Earliest stars; ← / Earliest galaxy; ← / Earliest quasar / black hole; ← / Omega Centauri; ← / Andromeda Galaxy; ← / Milky Way spirals; ← / NGC 188 star cluster; ← / Alpha Centauri; ← / Accelerated expansion; ← / Earth / Solar System; ← / Earliest known life; ← / Atmospheric oxygen; ← / Sexual reproduction; ← / Earliest fungi; ← / Earliest land plants; ← / Cambrian explosion; ← / Earliest mammals; ← / Earliest apes / humans
(billion years ago)

Physics and astrophysics have played central roles in shaping our understanding of the universe through scientific observation and experiment. Physical cosmology was shaped through both mathematics and observation in an analysis of the whole universe. The universe is generally understood to have begun with the Big Bang, followed almost instantaneously by cosmic inflation, an expansion of space from which the universe is thought to have emerged 13.799 ± 0.021 billion years ago. Cosmogony studies the origin of the universe, and cosmography maps the features of the universe.

In Denis Diderot's Encyclopédie, cosmology is broken down into uranology (the science of the heavens), aerology (the science of the air), geology (the science of the continents), and hydrology (the science of waters).

Metaphysical cosmology has also been described as the placing of humans in the universe in relationship to all other entities. This is exemplified by Marcus Aurelius's observation that a man's place in that relationship: "He who does not know what the world is does not know where he is, and he who does not know for what purpose the world exists, does not know who he is, nor what the world is."

=== Physical cosmology ===
Physical cosmology is the branch of physics and astrophysics that deals with the study of the physical origins and evolution of the universe. It also includes the study of the nature of the universe on a large scale. In its earliest form, it was what is now known as "celestial mechanics," the study of the heavens. Greek philosophers Aristarchus of Samos, Aristotle, and Ptolemy proposed different cosmological theories. The geocentric Ptolemaic system was the prevailing theory until the 16th century when Nicolaus Copernicus, and subsequently Johannes Kepler and Galileo Galilei, proposed a heliocentric system. This is one of the most famous examples of epistemological rupture in physical cosmology.

Isaac Newton's Principia Mathematica, published in 1687, was the first description of the law of universal gravitation. It provided a physical mechanism for Kepler's laws and also allowed the anomalies in previous systems, caused by gravitational interaction between the planets, to be resolved. A fundamental difference between Newton's cosmology and those preceding it was the Copernican principle—that the bodies on Earth obey the same physical laws as all celestial bodies. This was a crucial philosophical advance in physical cosmology.

In the 19th century various cosmological paradoxes appeared related to Newtonian gravity, including Olbers' paradox (why is the sky dark?), Bentley–Seeliger paradox (why gravitation does not make the universe collapse?) and the heat death paradox (why hasn't the universe reach thermal equilibrium?). All three indicated a non-infinite universe.

Modern scientific cosmology is widely considered to have begun in 1917 with Albert Einstein's publication of his final modification of general relativity in the paper "Cosmological Considerations of the General Theory of Relativity" (although this paper was not widely available outside of Germany until the end of World War I). General relativity prompted cosmogonists such as Willem de Sitter, Karl Schwarzschild, and Arthur Eddington to explore its astronomical ramifications, which enhanced the ability of astronomers to study very distant objects. Physicists began changing the assumption that the universe was static and unchanging. In 1922, Alexander Friedmann introduced the idea of an expanding universe that contained moving matter.

In parallel to this dynamic approach to cosmology, one long-standing debate about the structure of the cosmos was coming to a climax – the Great Debate (1917 to 1922) – with early cosmologists such as Heber Curtis and Ernst Öpik determining that some nebulae seen in telescopes were separate galaxies far distant from our own. While Heber Curtis argued for the idea that spiral nebulae were star systems in their own right as island universes, Mount Wilson astronomer Harlow Shapley championed the model of a cosmos made up of the Milky Way star system only. This difference of ideas came to a climax with the organization of the Great Debate on 26 April 1920 at the meeting of the U.S. National Academy of Sciences in Washington, D.C. The debate was resolved when Edwin Hubble detected Cepheid Variables in the Andromeda Galaxy in 1923 and 1924. Their distance established spiral nebulae well beyond the edge of the Milky Way.

Subsequent modelling of the universe explored the possibility that the cosmological constant, introduced by Einstein in his 1917 paper, may result in an expanding universe, depending on its value. Thus the Big Bang model was proposed by the Belgian priest Georges Lemaître in 1927 which was subsequently corroborated by Edwin Hubble's discovery of the redshift in 1929 and later by the discovery of the cosmic microwave background radiation by Arno Penzias and Robert Woodrow Wilson in 1964. These findings were a first step to rule out some of many alternative cosmologies.

Since around 1990, several dramatic advances in observational cosmology have transformed cosmology from a largely speculative science into a predictive science with precise agreement between theory and observation. These advances include observations of the microwave background from the COBE, WMAP and Planck satellites, large new galaxy redshift surveys including 2dfGRS and SDSS, and observations of distant supernovae and gravitational lensing. These observations matched the predictions of the cosmic inflation theory, a modified Big Bang theory, and the specific version known as the Lambda-CDM model. This has led many to refer to modern times as the "golden age of cosmology".

In 2014, the BICEP2 collaboration claimed that they had detected the imprint of gravitational waves in the cosmic microwave background. However, this result was later found to be spurious: the supposed evidence of gravitational waves was in fact due to interstellar dust.

On 1 December 2014, at the Planck 2014 meeting in Ferrara, Italy, astronomers reported that the universe is 13.8 billion years old and composed of 4.9% atomic matter, 26.6% dark matter and 68.5% dark energy.

=== Religious or mythological cosmology ===
Religious or mythological cosmology is a body of beliefs based on mythological, religious, and esoteric literature and traditions of creation and eschatology. Historically, religious cosmology and myths have intertwined with scientific and philosophical understandings, but recent scientific cosmology has challenged many aspects of religious cosmology. Generally, scientific cosmology is grounded in empirical evidence and observations, while religious and mythological cosmology relies on the persuasive arguments by prophets, philosophers, or mathematicians.

=== Philosophy ===
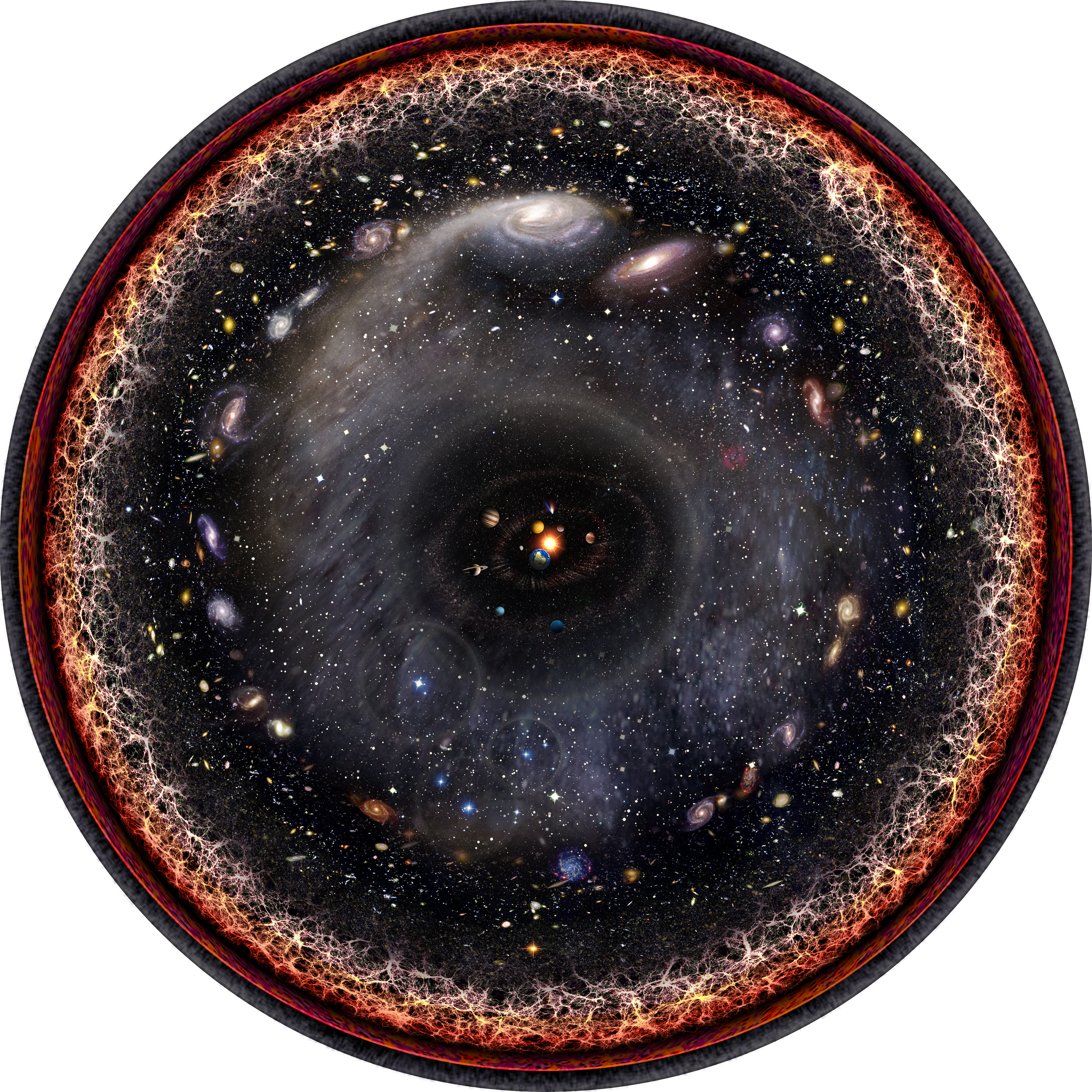
Representation of the observable universe on a logarithmic scale. Distance from the Sun increases from center to edge. Planets and other celestial bodies were enlarged to appreciate their shapes.

Cosmology deals with the world as the totality of space, time and all phenomena. Historically, it has had quite a broad scope, and in many cases was found in religion. Some questions about the Universe are beyond the scope of scientific inquiry but may still be interrogated through appeals to other philosophical approaches like dialectics. Some questions that are included in extra-scientific endeavors may include:

- What is the origin of the universe? What is its first cause (if any)? Is its existence necessary? (see monism, pantheism, emanationism and creationism)
- What are the ultimate material components of the universe? (see mechanism, dynamism, hylomorphism, atomism)
- What is the ultimate reason (if any) for the existence of the universe? Does the cosmos have a purpose? (see teleology)
- Does the existence of consciousness have a role in the existence of reality? How do we know what we know about the totality of the cosmos? Does cosmological reasoning reveal metaphysical truths? (see epistemology)

Charles Kahn, a historian of philosophy, attributed the origins of ancient Greek cosmology to Anaximander.

== Historical cosmologies ==
Name	Author and date	Classification	Remarks
Hindu cosmology	Rigveda (c. 1700–1100 BCE)	Cyclical or oscillating, Infinite in time	Primal matter remains manifest for 311.04 trillion years and unmanifest for an equal length of time. The universe remains manifest for 4.32 billion years and unmanifest for an equal length of time. Innumerable universes exist simultaneously. These cycles have and will last forever, driven by desires.
Zoroastrian Cosmology	Avesta (c. 1500–600 BCE)	Dualistic Cosmology	According to Zoroastrian Cosmology, the universe is the manifestation of perpetual conflict between Existence and non-existence, Good and evil and light and darkness. the universe will remain in this state for 12000 years; at the time of resurrection, the two elements will be separated again.
Jain cosmology	Jain Agamas (written around 500 CE as per the teachings of Mahavira 599–527 BCE)	Cyclical or oscillating, eternal and finite	Jain cosmology considers the loka, or universe, as an uncreated entity, existing since infinity, the shape of the universe as similar to a man standing with legs apart and arm resting on his waist. This Universe, according to Jainism, is broad at the top, narrow at the middle and once again becomes broad at the bottom.
Babylonian cosmology	Babylonian literature (c. 2300–500 BCE)	Flat Earth floating in infinite "waters of chaos"	The Earth and the Heavens form a unit within infinite "waters of chaos"; the Earth is flat and circular, and a solid dome (the "firmament") keeps out the outer "chaos"-ocean.
Eleatic cosmology	Parmenides (c. 515 BCE)	Finite and spherical in extent	The Universe is unchanging, uniform, perfect, necessary, timeless, and neither generated nor perishable. Void is impossible. Plurality and change are products of epistemic ignorance derived from sense experience. Temporal and spatial limits are arbitrary and relative to the Parmenidean whole.
Samkhya Cosmic Evolution	Kapila (6th century BCE), pupil Asuri	Prakriti (Matter) and Purusha (Consiouness) Relation	Prakriti (Matter) is the source of the world of becoming. It is pure potentiality that evolves itself successively into twenty four tattvas or principles. The evolution itself is possible because Prakriti is always in a state of tension among its constituent strands known as gunas (Sattva (lightness or purity), Rajas (passion or activity), and Tamas (inertia or heaviness)). The cause and effect theory of Sankhya is called Satkaarya-vaada (theory of existent causes), and holds that nothing can really be created from or destroyed into nothingness—all evolution is simply the transformation of primal Nature from one form to another.
Biblical cosmology	Genesis creation narrative	Earth floating in infinite "waters of chaos"	The Earth and the Heavens form a unit within infinite "waters of chaos"; the "firmament" keeps out the outer "chaos"-ocean.
Anaximander's model	Anaximander (c. 560 BCE)	Geocentric, cylindrical Earth, infinite in extent, finite time; first purely mechanical model	The Earth floats very still in the centre of the infinite, not supported by anything. At the origin, after the separation of hot and cold, a ball of flame appeared that surrounded Earth like bark on a tree. This ball broke apart to form the rest of the Universe. It resembled a system of hollow concentric wheels, filled with fire, with the rims pierced by holes like those of a flute; no heavenly bodies as such, only light through the holes. Three wheels, in order outwards from Earth: stars (including planets), moon, and a large Sun.
Atomist universe	Anaxagoras (500–428 BCE) and later Epicurus	Infinite in extent	The universe contains only two things: an infinite number of tiny seeds (atoms) and the void of infinite extent. All atoms are made of the same substance, but differ in size and shape. Objects are formed from atom aggregations and decay back into atoms. Incorporates Leucippus' principle of causality: "nothing happens at random; everything happens out of reason and necessity". The universe was not ruled by gods.
Pythagorean universe	Philolaus (d. 390 BCE)	Existence of a "Central Fire" at the center of the Universe.	At the center of the Universe is a central fire, around which the Earth, Sun, Moon and planets revolve uniformly. The Sun revolves around the central fire once a year, the stars are immobile. The Earth in its motion maintains the same hidden face towards the central fire, hence it is never seen. First known non-geocentric model of the Universe.
De Mundo	Pseudo-Aristotle (d. 250 BCE or between 350 and 200 BCE)	The Universe is a system made up of heaven and Earth and the elements which are contained in them.	There are "five elements, situated in spheres in five regions, the less being in each case surrounded by the greater – namely, earth surrounded by water, water by air, air by fire, and fire by ether – make up the whole Universe."
Stoic universe	Stoics (300 BCE – 200 CE)	Island universe	The cosmos is finite and surrounded by an infinite void. It is in a state of flux, and pulsates in size and undergoes periodic upheavals and conflagrations.
Platonic universe	Plato (c. 360 BCE)	Geocentric, complex cosmogony, finite extent, implied finite time, cyclical	Static Earth at center, surrounded by heavenly bodies which move in perfect circles, arranged by the will of the Demiurge in order: Moon, Sun, planets and fixed stars. Complex motions repeat every 'perfect' year.
Eudoxus' model	Eudoxus of Cnidus (c. 340 BCE) and later Callippus	Geocentric, first geometric-mathematical model	The heavenly bodies move as if attached to a number of Earth-centered concentrical, invisible spheres, each of them rotating around its own and different axis and at different paces. There are twenty-seven homocentric spheres with each sphere explaining a type of observable motion for each celestial object. Eudoxus emphasised that this is a purely mathematical construct of the model in the sense that the spheres of each celestial body do not exist, it just shows the possible positions of the bodies.
Aristotelian universe	Aristotle (384–322 BCE)	Geocentric (based on Eudoxus' model), static, steady state, finite extent, infinite time	Static and spherical Earth is surrounded by 43 to 55 concentric celestial spheres, which are material and crystalline. Universe exists unchanged throughout eternity. Contains a fifth element, called aether, that was added to the four classical elements.
Aristarchean universe	Aristarchus (c. 280 BCE)	Heliocentric	Earth rotates daily on its axis and revolves annually about the Sun in a circular orbit. Sphere of fixed stars is centered about the Sun.
Ptolemaic model	Ptolemy (2nd century CE)	Geocentric (based on Aristotelian universe)	Universe orbits around a stationary Earth. Planets move in circular epicycles, each having a center that moved in a larger circular orbit (called an eccentric or a deferent) around a center-point near Earth. The use of equants added another level of complexity and allowed astronomers to predict the positions of the planets. The most successful universe model of all time, using the criterion of longevity. The Almagest (the Great System).
Capella's model	Martianus Capella (c. 420)	Geocentric and Heliocentric	The Earth is at rest in the center of the universe and circled by the Moon, the Sun, three planets and the stars, while Mercury and Venus circle the Sun.
Aryabhatan model	Aryabhata (499)	Geocentric or Heliocentric	The Earth rotates and the planets move in elliptical orbits around either the Earth or Sun; uncertain whether the model is geocentric or heliocentric due to planetary orbits given with respect to both the Earth and Sun.
Quranic cosmology	Quran (610–632 CE)	Flat-earth (Sometimes interpreted as a geocentric globe)	The universe consists of stacked flat layers, including seven levels of heaven and in some interpretations seven levels of earth (including hell). Some medieval Islamic scholars did not agree with this interpretation of the Quran, arguing for a Ptolemaic model instead.
Medieval universe	Medieval philosophers (500–1200)	Finite in time	A universe that is finite in time and has a beginning is proposed by the Christian philosopher John Philoponus, who argues against the ancient Greek notion of an infinite past. Logical arguments supporting a finite universe are developed by the early Muslim philosopher Al-Kindi, the Jewish philosopher Saadia Gaon, and the Muslim theologian Al-Ghazali.
Non-Parallel Multiverse	Bhagvata Puran (800–1000)	Multiverse, Non Parallel	Innumerable universes is comparable to the multiverse theory, except nonparallel where each universe is different and individual jiva-atmas (embodied souls) exist in exactly one universe at a time. All universes manifest from the same matter, and so they all follow parallel time cycles, manifesting and unmanifesting at the same time.
Multiversal cosmology	Fakhr al-Din al-Razi (1149–1209)	Multiverse, multiple worlds and universes	There exists an infinite outer space beyond the known world, and God has the power to fill the vacuum with an infinite number of universes.
Maragha models	Maragha school (1259–1528)	Geocentric	Various modifications to Ptolemaic model and Aristotelian universe, including rejection of equant and eccentrics at Maragheh observatory, and introduction of Tusi-couple by Al-Tusi. Alternative models later proposed, including the first accurate lunar model by Ibn al-Shatir, a model rejecting stationary Earth in favour of Earth's rotation by Ali Kuşçu, and planetary model incorporating "circular inertia" by Al-Birjandi.
Nilakanthan model	Nilakantha Somayaji (1444–1544)	Geocentric and heliocentric	A universe in which the planets orbit the Sun, which orbits the Earth; similar to the later Tychonic system.
Copernican universe	Nicolaus Copernicus (1473–1543)	Heliocentric with circular planetary orbits, finite extent	First described in De revolutionibus orbium coelestium. The Sun is in the center of the universe, planets including Earth orbit the Sun, but the Moon orbits the Earth. The universe is limited by the sphere of the fixed stars.
Tychonic system	Tycho Brahe (1546–1601)	Geocentric and Heliocentric	A universe in which the planets orbit the Sun and the Sun orbits the Earth, similar to the earlier Nilakanthan model.
Bruno's cosmology	Giordano Bruno (1548–1600)	Infinite extent, infinite time, homogeneous, isotropic, non-hierarchical	Rejects the idea of a hierarchical universe. Earth and Sun have no special properties in comparison with the other heavenly bodies. The void between the stars is filled with aether, and matter is composed of the same four elements (water, earth, fire, and air), and is atomistic, animistic and intelligent.
De Magnete	William Gilbert (1544–1603)	Heliocentric, indefinitely extended	Copernican heliocentrism, but he rejects the idea of a limiting sphere of the fixed stars for which no proof has been offered.
Keplerian	Johannes Kepler (1571–1630)	Heliocentric with elliptical planetary orbits	Kepler's discoveries, marrying mathematics and physics, provided the foundation for the present conception of the Solar System, but distant stars were still seen as objects in a thin, fixed celestial sphere.
Cartesian Vortex universe	René Descartes 17th century	Static (evolving), steady state, infinite	System of huge swirling whirlpools of aethereal or fine matter produces gravitational effects. But his vacuum was not empty; all space was filled with matter.
Newtonian universe	Isaac Newton (1642–1727)	Static (evolving), steady state, infinite	Every particle in the universe attracts every other particle. Matter on the large scale is uniformly distributed. Gravitationally balanced but unstable.
Nebular hypothesis	Immanuel Kant, Johann Lambert, Pierre-Simon Laplace 18th century	Static (evolving), steady state, infinite	Matter gets clustered forming galaxies and matter is endlessly recycled. Island universes exist.
Heat death of the universe	Lord Kelvin, W. J. M. Rankine, Hermann von Helmholtz, 1851	Dynamic	Universe must be finite age to avoid the heat death paradox
Hierarchical universe	Richard A. Proctor, Carl Charlier (1870,1902)	Static, infinite	Matter is clustered with increasing distances. It solves Olbers' paradox and Bentley's paradox.
Seeliger's universe	Hugo von Seeliger 1895	Static, infinite	Gravity decays exponentially allowing for an infinite universe.
Einstein Universe with a cosmological constant	Albert Einstein 1917	Static (nominally). Bounded (finite)	"Matter without motion". Contains uniformly distributed matter. Uniformly curved spherical space; based on Riemann's hypersphere. Curvature is set equal to Λ. In effect Λ is equivalent to a repulsive force which counteracts gravity. Unstable.
De Sitter universe	Willem de Sitter 1917	Expanding flat space. Steady state. Λ > 0	"Motion without matter." Only apparently static. Based on Einstein's general relativity. Space expands with constant acceleration. Scale factor increases exponentially (constant inflation).
MacMillan universe	William Duncan MacMillan 1920s	Static and steady state	New matter is created from radiation; starlight perpetually recycled into new matter particles.
Friedmann universe, spherical space	Alexander Friedmann 1922	Spherical expanding space. k = +1 ; no Λ	Positive curvature. Curvature constant k = +1 Expands then recollapses. Spatially closed (finite).
Friedmann universe, hyperbolic space	Alexander Friedmann 1924	Hyperbolic expanding space. k = −1 ; no Λ	Negative curvature. Said to be infinite (but ambiguous). Unbounded. Expands forever.
Dirac large numbers hypothesis	Paul Dirac 1930s	Expanding	Demands a large variation in G, which decreases with time. Gravity weakens as universe evolves.
Friedmann zero-curvature	Einstein and De Sitter 1932	Expanding flat space k = 0 ; Λ = 0 Critical density	Curvature constant k = 0. Said to be infinite (but ambiguous). "Unbounded cosmos of limited extent". Expands forever. "Simplest" of all known universes. Named after but not considered by Friedmann. Has a deceleration term q = 1/2, which means that its expansion rate slows down.
The original Big Bang (Friedmann-Lemaître)	Georges Lemaître 1927–1929	Expansion	Λ is positive and has a magnitude greater than gravity. Universe has initial high-density state ("primeval atom"). Followed by a two-stage expansion. Λ is used to destabilize the universe. (Lemaître is considered the father of the Big Bang model.)
Oscillating universe (Friedmann-Einstein)	Favored by Friedmann 1920s	Expanding and contracting in cycles	Time is endless and beginningless; thus avoids the beginning-of-time paradox. Perpetual cycles of Big Bang followed by Big Crunch. (Einstein's first choice after he rejected his 1917 model.)
Eddington universe	Arthur Eddington 1930	First static then expands	Static Einstein 1917 universe with its instability disturbed into expansion mode; with relentless matter dilution becomes a De Sitter universe. Λ dominates gravity.
Milne universe of kinematic relativity	Edward Milne 1933, 1935; William H. McCrea 1930s	Kinematic expansion without space expansion	Rejects general relativity and the expanding space paradigm. Gravity not included as initial assumption. Obeys cosmological principle and special relativity; consists of a finite spherical cloud of particles (or galaxies) that expands within an infinite and otherwise empty flat space. It has a center and a cosmic edge (surface of the particle cloud) that expands at light speed. Explanation of gravity was elaborate and unconvincing.
Friedmann–Lemaître–Robertson–Walker class of models	Howard Robertson, Arthur Walker 1935	Uniformly expanding	Class of universes that are homogeneous and isotropic. Spacetime separates into uniformly curved space and cosmic time common to all co-moving observers. The formulation system is now known as the FLRW or Robertson–Walker metrics of cosmic time and curved space.
Steady-state	Hermann Bondi, Thomas Gold 1948	Expanding, steady state, infinite	Matter creation rate maintains constant density. Continuous creation out of nothing from nowhere. Exponential expansion. Deceleration term q = −1.
Steady-state	Fred Hoyle 1948	Expanding, steady state; but unstable	Matter creation rate maintains constant density. But since matter creation rate must be exactly balanced with the space expansion rate the system is unstable.
Ambiplasma	Hannes Alfvén 1965 Oskar Klein	Cellular universe, expanding by means of matter–antimatter annihilation	Based on the concept of plasma cosmology. The universe is viewed as "meta-galaxies" divided by double layers and thus a bubble-like nature. Other universes are formed from other bubbles. Ongoing cosmic matter-antimatter annihilations keep the bubbles separated and moving apart preventing them from interacting.
Brans–Dicke theory	Carl H. Brans, Robert H. Dicke	Expanding	Based on Mach's principle. G varies with time as universe expands. "But nobody is quite sure what Mach's principle actually means."
Cosmic inflation	Alan Guth 1980	Big Bang modified to solve horizon and flatness problems	Based on the concept of hot inflation. The universe is viewed as a multiple quantum flux – hence its bubble-like nature. Other universes are formed from other bubbles. Ongoing cosmic expansion kept the bubbles separated and moving apart.
Eternal inflation (a multiple universe model)	Andreï Linde 1983	Big Bang with cosmic inflation	Multiverse based on the concept of cold inflation, in which inflationary events occur at random each with independent initial conditions; some expand into bubble universes supposedly like the entire cosmos. Bubbles nucleate in a spacetime foam.
Cyclic model	Paul Steinhardt; Neil Turok 2002	Expanding and contracting in cycles; M-theory	Two parallel orbifold planes or M-branes collide periodically in a higher-dimensional space. With quintessence or dark energy.
Conformal cyclic cosmology	Roger Penrose 2006	Based on conformal rescaling	A cyclic universe in which the infinitely expanded future of one aeon becomes the Big Bang of the next through conformal rescaling.
Cyclic model	Lauris Baum; Paul Frampton 2007	Solution of Tolman's entropy problem	Phantom dark energy fragments universe into large number of disconnected patches. The observable patch contracts containing only dark energy with zero entropy.

Table notes: the term "static" simply means not expanding and not contracting. Symbol G represents Newton's gravitational constant; Λ (Lambda) is the cosmological constant.

== See also ==
- Absolute time and space
- Big History
- Earth science
- Galaxy formation and evolution
- Illustris project
- Jainism and non-creationism
- Lambda-CDM model
- List of astrophysicists
- Non-standard cosmology
- Taiji (philosophy)
- Timeline of cosmological theories
- Universal rotation curve
- Warm inflation
- Big Ring

== Sources ==
- Bragg, Melvyn (2023). "The Universe's Shape". bbc.co.uk. BBC. "Melvyn Bragg discusses shape, size and topology of the universe and examines theories about its expansion. If it is already infinite, how can it be getting any bigger? And is there really only one?"
- "Cosmic Journey: A History of Scientific Cosmology". history.aip.org. American Institute of Physics. 2023. "The history of cosmology is a grand story of discovery, from ancient Greek astronomy to -space telescopes."
- Dodelson, Scott; Schmidt, Fabian (2020). Modern Cosmology 2nd Edition. Academic Press. ISBN 978-0128159484.
- Charles Kahn. 1994. Anaximander and the Origins of Greek Cosmology. Indianapolis: Hackett.
- "Genesis, Search for Origins. End of mission wrap up". genesismission.jpl.nasa.gov. NASA, Jet Propulsion Laboratory, California Institute of Technology. December 2017. "About 4.6 billion years ago, the solar nebula transformed into the present solar system. In order to chemically model the processes which drove that transformation, we would, ideally, like to have a sample of that original nebula to use as a baseline from which we can track changes."
- Lyth, David (12 December 1993). "Introduction to Cosmology". arXiv:astro-ph/9312022. "These notes form an introduction to cosmology with special emphasis on large scale structure, the cmb anisotropy and inflation." Lectures given at the Summer School in High Energy Physics and Cosmology, ICTP (Trieste) 1993.) 60 pages, plus 5 Figures.
- "NASA/IPAC Extragalactic Database (NED)". ned.ipac.caltech.edu. NASA. 2023. "April 2023 Release Highlights Database Updates"
  - "NASA/IPAC Extragalactic Database (NED)". ned.ipac.caltech.edu. NASA. 2020. "NED-D: A Master List of Redshift-Independent Extragalactic Distances"
- Sophia Centre. The Sophia Centre for the Study of Cosmology in Culture, University of Wales Trinity Saint David.
