= Edward Robert Harrison =

British astronomer and cosmologist

- Born: 8 January 1919; London, England
- Died: 29 January 2007 (aged 88); Tucson, Arizona, US
- Education: Institute of Physics (UK)
- Known for: Cosmology; Harrison–Zeldovich spectrum Solving Olbers's paradox
- Awards: 1986 Melcher Award (for religious liberalism); Masks of the Universe
- Scientific career
- Fields: Astronomy
- Workplaces: University of Massachusetts, Amherst; University of Arizona; NASA

Edward R. Harrison (8 January 1919 – 29 January 2007) was a British astronomer and cosmologist, noted for his work about the increase of fluctuations in the expanding universe, for his explanation of Olbers's paradox, and for his books on cosmology for lay readers. He spent much of his career at the University of Massachusetts, Amherst, and University of Arizona, both in the United States.

== Life ==
Harrison's education at Sir John Cass Technical Institute was interrupted by World War II, during which he served for six years with the British Army in various military campaigns, eventually serving as Radar Adviser to the Northern Area of the (British) Egyptian Army.

Following World War II, Harrison was with the British Civil Service, first with the Atomic Energy Research Establishment in Harwell, and later at the Rutherford High Energy Laboratory. During this time he attained the equivalent of university degrees, becoming a graduate, then an Associate, and finally a Fellow of the Institute of Physics. He also became a Fellow of the Royal Astronomical Society, the American Physical Society, and the American Association for the Advancement of Science.

In his early career, Harrison did research at the Atomic Energy Research Establishment, at CERN and at the Rutherford High-Energy Laboratory. In 1965, Ted Harrison went to the US as a NAS-NRC Senior Research Associate at the NASA Goddard Space Flight Center, in Maryland. In 1966, he became one of the three founders of the Astronomy Program within the Department of Physics and Astronomy at the University of Massachusetts, Amherst. Over the next 30 years, he influenced the revival of the Five College Astronomy Department, linking UMass to Amherst College, Hampshire College, Smith College, and Mount Holyoke College. He also played a key role in the rise to international prominence of the Five College graduate course in astronomy. At his death, he was emeritus Distinguished University Professor of Physics and Astronomy at UMass, and an adjunct professor at the Steward Observatory of the University of Arizona.

== Work ==
Ted Harrison had broad interests, and he published more than 200 papers, primarily in astrophysics and cosmology, but also in space sciences, high energy physics, plasma physics and physical chemistry. He was an elegant writer with a passion for the history of ideas. His books (cf. especially his text Cosmology) illustrated points of physics or cosmology with many literary, philosophical, and historical references.

The work of Harrison and of Soviet physicist Yakov Borisovich Zel'dovich on structure formation from primordial density perturbations in the cosmic plasma has led to the general use of the term Harrison-Zel'dovich spectrum for primordial random fluctuations characterised by a scale-invariant power spectrum.

Harrison was fascinated with Olbers's paradox (the night sky is dark despite the vast number of stars in the universe). In 1964, he published detailed calculations that solved the paradox by concluding that stars do not generate enough energy to illuminate the entire sky. In 1987, he published a book, Darkness at Night, mulling over the Paradox and its rich history. This book clarified that the lack of energy is not primarily because the universe is expanding, but rather because the stars and galaxies have had only about 15 billion years to radiate, and do not have sufficient energy to keep radiating for much longer. Darkness at Night lays out how Harrison discovered that Edgar Allan Poe's essay Eureka anticipated this conclusion, and that Lord Kelvin had reached a very similar conclusion in a 1901 article ignored for 80 years until Harrison drew attention to it.

Harrison's text Cosmology: The Science of the Universe describes the problem of the cosmic edge of the universe by quoting 5th century BC soldier-philosopher Archytas, who questioned what occurs as a spear is hurled across the outer boundary of the universe.

His final book, Masks of the Universe (2nd ed., 2003), questions current perceptions of reality, asking whether present cosmology, with ordinary matter, dark matter, plus dark energy, is yet only another "mask" obscuring a Universe which will remain perforce forever unknown to humans.

== Books by Harrison ==
- 2003 (1985). Masks of the Universe. Cambridge Univ. Press. ISBN 978-0-02-948780-8
- 2000 (1981). Cosmology: The Science of the Universe. Cambridge Univ. Press. ISBN 0-521-66148-X.
- 1987. Darkness at Night: A Riddle of the Universe, Harvard University Press. ISBN 978-0-674-19270-6.
- 1965. Elementary cosmology. OCLC 27124102

== See also ==
- Olbers's paradox
