= Henry Savile (Bible translator) =

English scholar and mathematician (1549–1622)

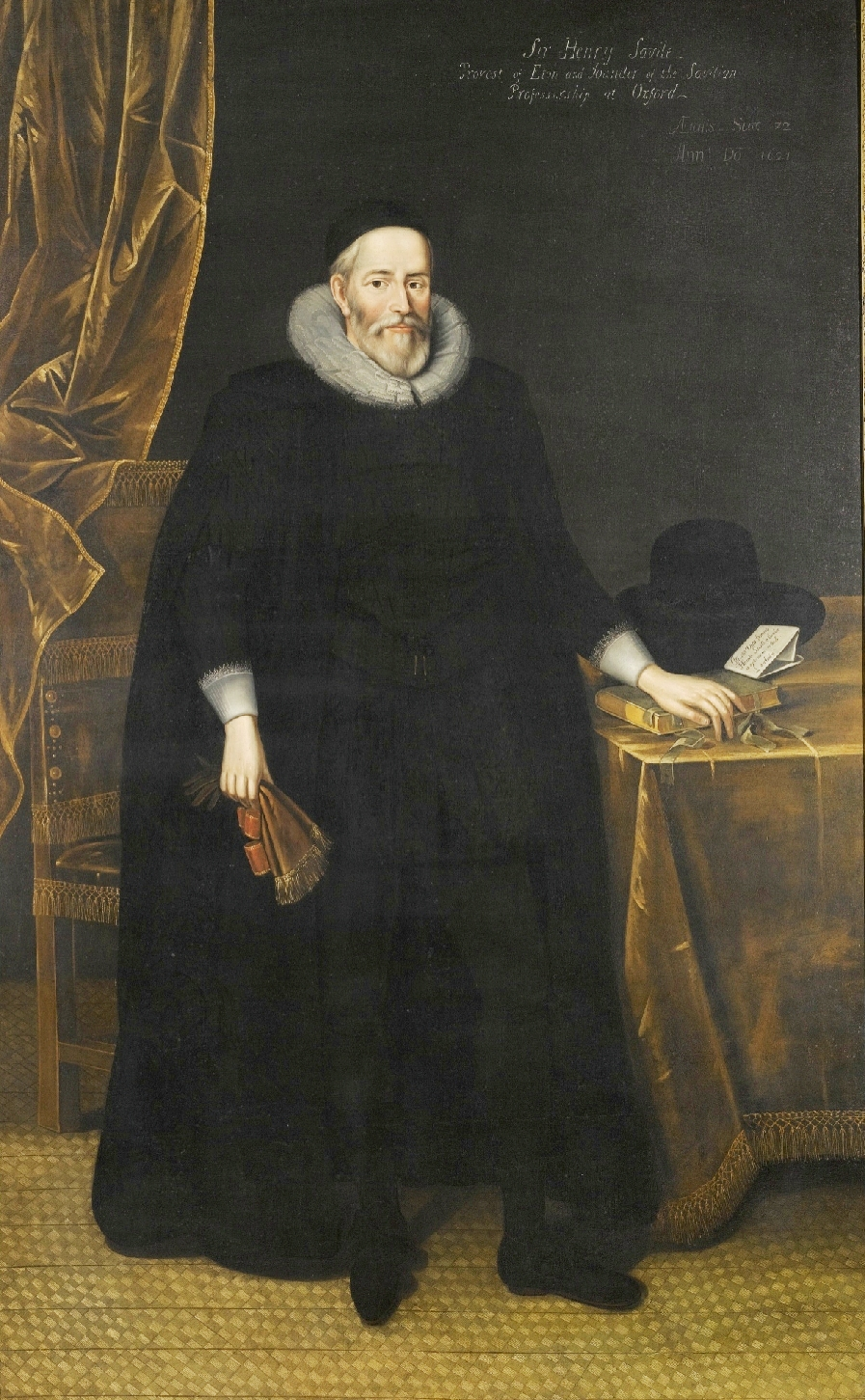
Henry Savile in 1621. School of Marcus Gheeraerts the Younger

Sir Henry Savile (30 November 1549 – 19 February 1622) was an English scholar and mathematician, Warden of Merton College, Oxford, and Provost of Eton. He endowed the Savilian chairs of Astronomy and of Geometry at Oxford University and was one of the scholars who translated the New Testament from Greek into English. He was a member of the Parliament of England for Bossiney in Cornwall in 1589 and Dunwich in Suffolk in 1593.

== Life ==
He was the son of Henry Savile of Over Bradley, Stainland, near Halifax, West Yorkshire, England, a member of an old county family, the Saviles of Methley, and of his wife Elizabeth, daughter of Robert Ramsden.

Savile matriculated at Brasenose College, Oxford in 1561. He then became a Fellow of Merton College in 1565. He established a reputation as a Greek scholar and mathematician by voluntary lectures on Ptolemy's Almagest and in 1575 became Junior Proctor of the university. In 1578 he travelled on the continent of Europe, where he collected manuscripts, and is said to have been employed by Queen Elizabeth as her resident in the Low Countries. On his return he was named Greek tutor to the Queen.

In 1583, Lord Burghley appointed Savile, with John Chamber and Thomas Digges, to sit on a commission to consider whether England should adopt the Gregorian calendar, as proposed by John Dee. In 1585 he was established as Warden of Merton by a vigorous exercise of the interest of Burghley and Secretary Walsingham. He proved a successful and autocratic head of house, generally unpopular with Fellows and undergraduates, but under him the college flourished. His translation of four books of the Histories of Tacitus, with the learned Commentary on Roman Warfare (1591), enhanced his reputation. He also sat in Parliament as one of the two members for Bossiney in 1589 and for Dunwich (both were notorious rotten boroughs) in 1593.

On 26 May 1596 he obtained the provostship of Eton College, the reward of persistent begging. He was not qualified for the post under the statutes of the college, for he was not in holy orders, and the queen was reluctant to name him. Savile insisted with considerable ingenuity that the Queen had a right to dispense with statutes, and at last he got his way. In February 1601 he was put under arrest on suspicion of having been concerned in the rebellion of the Earl of Essex.

He was soon released, and his friendship with the faction of Essex went far to gain him the favour of James I. So no doubt did the views he had maintained in regard to the statutes of Eton. It may have been to his advantage that his elder brother, Sir John Savile (1545–1607), was a high prerogative lawyer and one of the barons of the exchequer, who in 1606 affirmed the right of the King to impose import and export duties on his own authority.

On 30 September 1604 Savile was knighted, and in that year he was named one of the body of scholars appointed to prepare the Authorised Version of the Bible. He was entrusted with parts of the Gospels, the Acts of the Apostles and the Book of Revelation.

In 1619 he founded and endowed a chair in astronomy and a chair in geometry at Oxford, both bearing his name. He died at Eton on 19 February 1622, and is buried there. A fine mural monument to him in Merton College Chapel offers views of contemporary Merton and Eton and references to his literary achievements (notably Chrysostom).

Sir Henry Savile has sometimes been confounded with another Henry Savile, called Long Harry (1570–1617), who gave currency to the forged addition to the Chronicle of Asser which contains the story that King Alfred founded the University of Oxford.

== Works ==
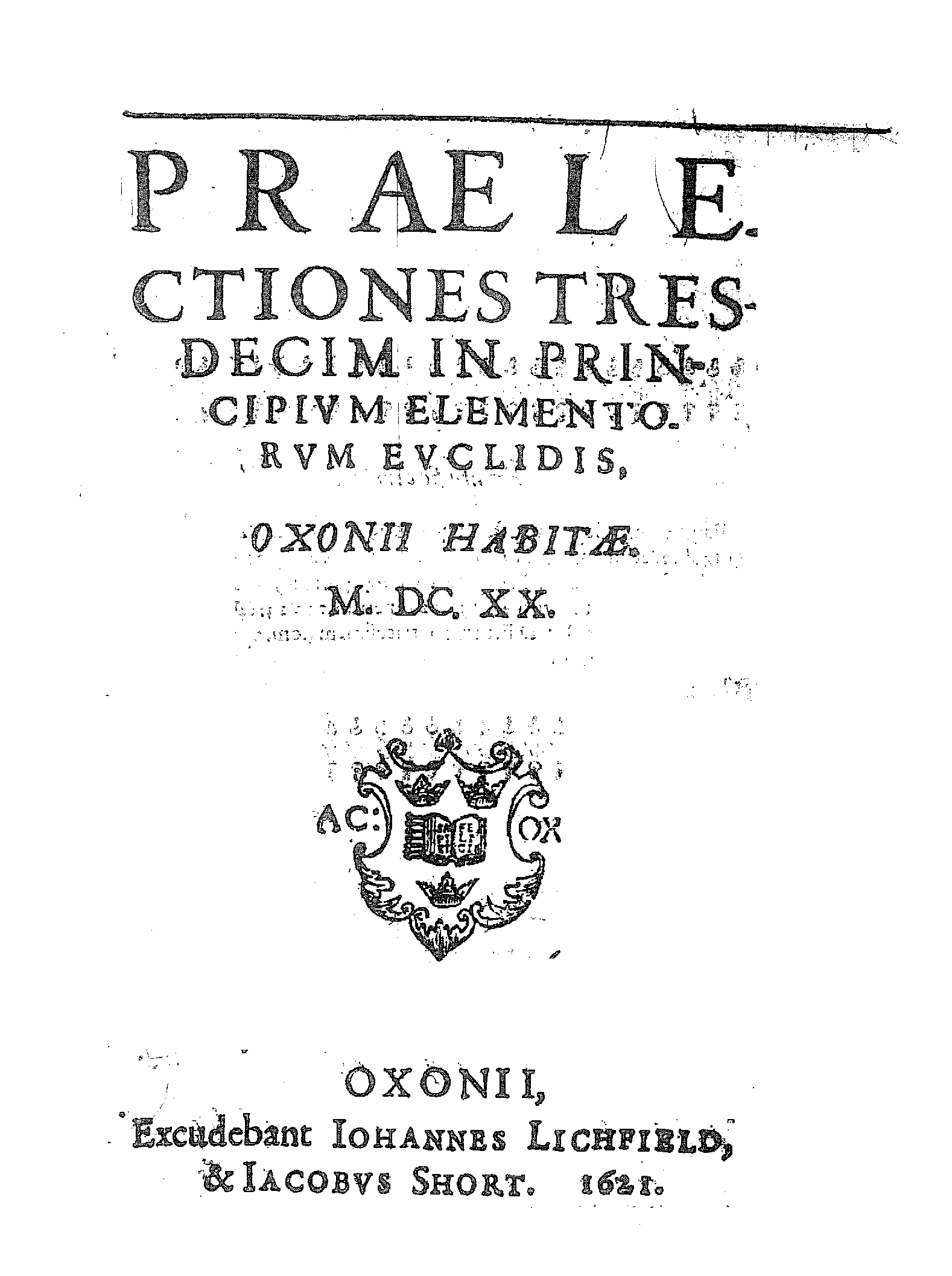
Title page of Savile's introductory lectures on Euclid's Elements, Praelectiones tresdecim in principium elementorum Euclidis (1621)

In 1596 Savile produced the first printed edition of the first four books of the Gesta Pontificum Anglorum – an ecclesiastical history of England written by William of Malmesbury in the early 12th century. Savile used Cambridge University Library MS Ff.1.25.1 as his source for this, which was a copy of a copy of the original manuscript.

His edition of the works of St. John Chrysostom in eight folio volumes was published in 1610–1613. It was printed by the king's printer on a private press erected at the expense of Sir Henry, who imported the type. The Chrysostom cost him £8,000 and did not sell well. However, it was the most considerable work of pure learning undertaken in England in his time, as it involved consulting French Chrysostomians and the despatching of young researchers to the Imperial Library in Vienna and the Patriarchal Library at Heybeliada or Halki, (then under the Ottoman Empire) and other leading monasteries and/or collections in his time. At the same press he published an edition of the Cyropaedia in 1618.

Savile was keen to impart his understanding of mathematics to his students at Oxford, and in founding the Geometry chair he gave thirteen preparatory lectures on the original books of Euclid's Elements in 1620. These were published in 1621 as his Praelectiones tresdecim in principium elementorum Euclidis, Oxonii habitae MCDXX. Oxonii: Excudebant (Note: Excudere originally meant to forge, fashion or prepare any thing: According to William Whitaker, the sense of 'to publish' was coined by Erasmus.) Iohannes Lichfield, & Iacobus Short, 1621. ('Thirteen introductory lectures on the beginning of the Elements of Euclid, held at Oxford in 1620'.) It was Savile who first traced the hand of Theon of Alexandria as a commentator on Euclid, and Savile who first clearly distinguished Euclid of Alexandria from Euclid of Megara (an earlier philosopher), until then largely conflated with each other in medieval and Renaissance scholarship.

The edition published in England, until then the only one containing all the extant works attributed to Euclid, was that of Dr David Gregory, published at Oxford in 1703, with the title, Εὐκλείδου τὰ σωζόμενα, Euclidis quae supersunt omnia. The parallel Greek text is that of the 1533 Basel edition by Simon Grynäus, corrected from Savile's 13th century Greek MSS. which Savile bequeathed to the Savilian Library, and from Savile's annotations in his own copy. The Latin translation, which accompanies the Greek on the same page, is for the most part that of Commandino.

== Collections ==
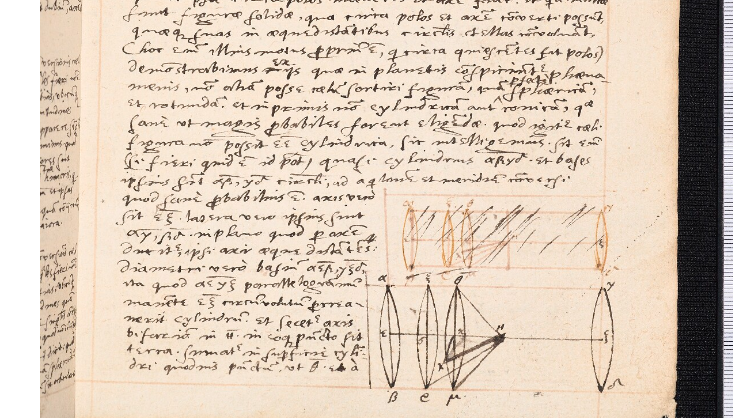
Henry Savile's Latin version of the Almagest of Ptolemy, vol. 1, from Digital Bodleian

In 1619, after founding two lectureships in geometry and astronomy, Savile donated a library to the university. It was a collection of mathematical works, including the related subjects of optics, harmonics, mechanics, cosmography, the applied sciences of surveying, navigation, and fortification, and a quantity of fine printed books, primarily from the 16th century.

Nearly all of the seventeenth-century Savilian professors added to the library. Dr. Peter Turner (Geometry Chair, 1631–48) bequeathed Greek manuscripts, John Greaves (Astronomy Chair, 1643-9) added some of his own papers. Part of the Savilian library might also have come from Dr. Seth Ward (Astronomy Chair, 1649–61) sometime after 1682. It was Sir Christopher Wren (Astronomy, 1661-1673), however, who gave the first extensive contribution to the library, leaving his astronomy and geometry books to it when he retired from the Chair. A catalogue of the Savile library appeared in Dr. Edward Bernard's (Astronomy chair, 1673–91) Catalogi Librorum Manuscriptorum Angliae and Hiberniae. Dr. John Wallis (Savilian professor, 1649-1704) gave the Savilian library 'the largest of its accretions', and many more were provided after his death in 1703. In the eighteenth century, not much more was added to Savile's collection, but later Stephen Rigaud (Geometry Chair, 1810–27; Astronomy, 1827–39) catalogued and contributed to it further. Rigaud died in 1839, and in 1874 his sons presented his scientific notebooks to the Savile library.

In 1835 Savile's library was moved to the south-east corner of the Bodleian quadrangle, where it remained until 1884, when the Savilian professors agreed to hand over its administration to the Bodleian Library.

== Family ==
In 1592 he married Margaret, daughter of George Dacre, of Chesham. In 1604 their only son died, and Savile is thought to have been induced by this loss to devote the bulk of his fortune to the promotion of learning. His surviving child Elizabeth married Sir John Sedley and was mother of Sir Charles Sedley.

His brother, Thomas Savile (died 1593), was also a member of Merton College and had some reputation as a scholar.

Academic offices
Preceded by Thomas Bickley	Warden of Merton College, Oxford; 1585–1625	Succeeded by Nathaniel Brent
