= Bentley's paradox =

Cosmological paradox involving gravity

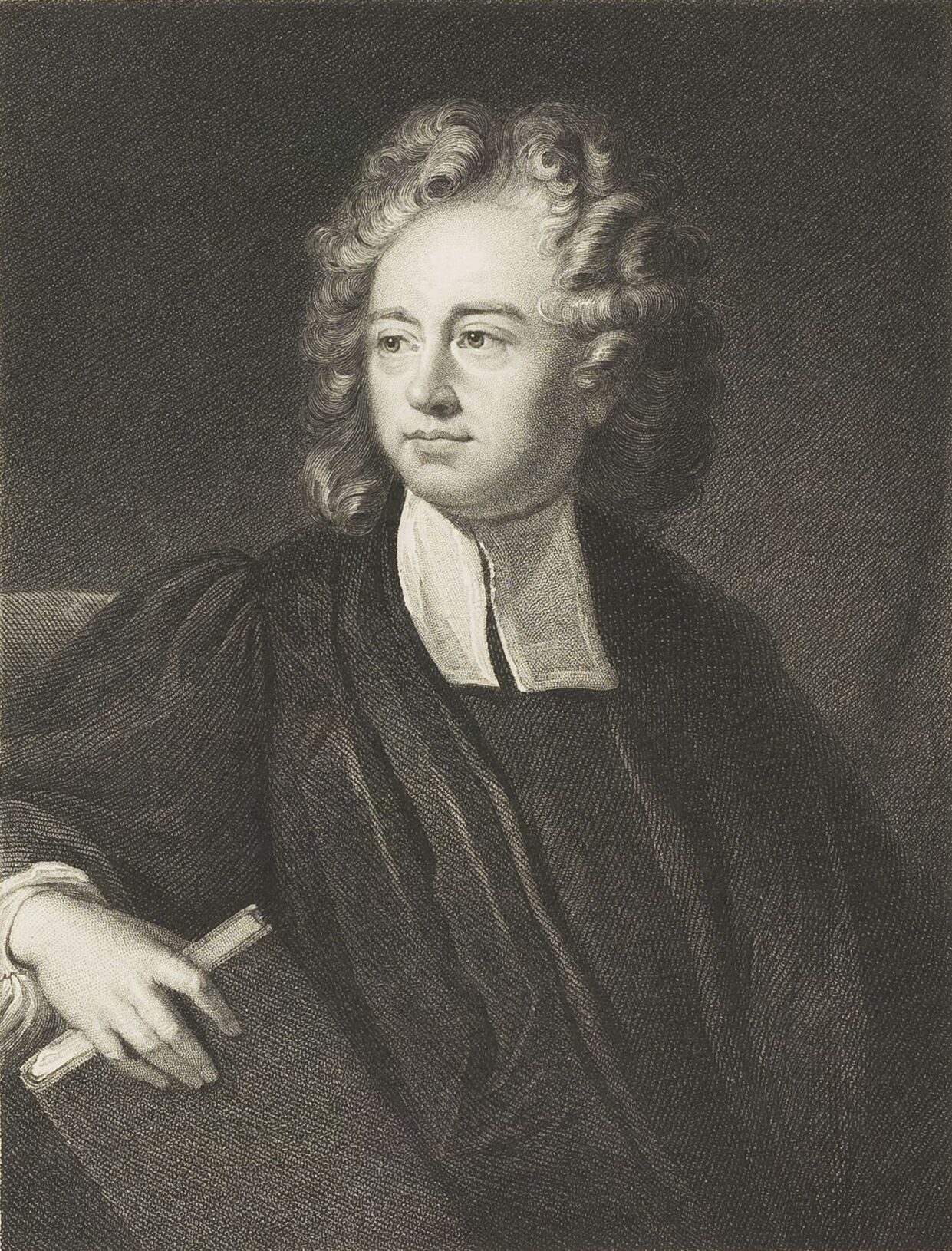
Richard Bentley

In cosmology, Bentley's paradox, also known as Seeliger's paradox, Bentley–Seeliger paradox or Neumann–Seeliger paradox points to a problem occurring when Newton's theory of gravitation is applied to the universe. This cosmological paradox states that if all the stars are drawn to each other by gravitation, they should collapse into a single point.

The problem was noticed as far back to Richard Bentley in the 1690s. Hugo von Seeliger proved it mathematically in 1895.

Today it is known that an infinite universe uniformly filled with gravitating matter, if it originated in a static configuration, would indeed collapse. This conclusion originally arose from the general theory of relativity, but it is also predicted by Newtonian gravity with the use of mathematical tools that were not available to Newton.

Though Newton's explanation was rather unsatisfactory from a cosmological aspect, Bentley's paradox could prove to be the reason behind the "Big Crunch", the opposite phenomenon of the "Big Bang".

== Bentley's work ==
In 1687, Isaac Newton published the Principia which contained his universal law of gravitational attraction. Five years later, Richard Bentley, a young churchman and scholar who was preparing a lecture about Newton's theories and the rejection of atheism, wrote a letter to Newton: in a finite universe, if all stars attract each other, would they not collapse into a point? And in an infinite universe with infinitely many stars, would not every star be pulled apart by infinite forces acting in all directions? In his reply, Newton agreed with the first point and favored an infinite universe with infinitely many stars, so that each star would be drawn in all directions equally, the forces would cancel and no collapse would occur. Newton acknowledged the problem that the stars would have to be precisely placed to maintain such an unstable equilibrium without collapse, and later claimed that God prevented the collapse by making "constant minute corrections"; "a continual miracle is needed to prevent the Sun and the fixt stars from rushing together through gravity."

Both Newton and Bentley thought that the stars did not move and did not consider stars in motion. It was suggested that finite number of mutually attracting stars in motion can indeed avoid collapse.

== Seeliger's paradox ==
Hugo von Seeliger proved mathematically in 1895 that an Euclidean space with uniformly distributed matter collapses under Newtonian gravity. Seeliger showed that the integral of the gravitational forces summed over all masses in an infinite universe diverged. He concluded that the universe must be finite. Seeliger also showed that under Newton's theory stars with finite speed could reach infinitely great speeds in finite time.

In 1896, Carl Neumann came up with the same conclusion, stating that he had developed it years before Seeliger.

Lord Kelvin, unaware of Seeliger's work, arrived at the same conclusion in 1901–1902. Kelvin showed that in a Newtonian universe, bodies will feel an infinite gravitational force. Choosing the radius of the universe to be about 3.8•10^{-7} km, he considered that stars to be on average the mass of the Sun, he found it probable that there was about two billion stars within the sphere. He then showed that the time for the sphere to collapse was independent of the initial size of the universe and it turned out to be
$$t_{\text{collapse}}=\frac{1}{4}\sqrt{\frac{3\pi }{2} G\rho}$$
for a uniform mass density ρ. His estimation indicate a time of collapse of 17 million years, about the same order of time as the age of Earth and the Sun according to his calculations. James Jeans came to a similar conclusion as Kelvin in 1902.

In 1917, Albert Einstein pointed out that Newtonian theory only allows for the treatment of finite systems or some special infinite nonuniforms systems. The Dirichlet problem cannot be solved in uniform density systems and general relativity is required.

== Proposed solutions ==
=== Seeliger's solution ===
Under Newtonian gravitation, a mass m in the gravitational field of a mass M at a distance r, feels a force given by

$$F(r)=G\frac{Mm}{r^2},$$
where G is the gravitational constant. In 1825, Pierre-Simon Laplace in his Traité de mécanique céleste, proposed a modified Newtonian law by adding an exponential damping factor Λ for large distances, of the form
$$F(r)=G\frac{Mm}{r^2}e^{-\Lambda r},$$
to solve planetary problems like the anomalous perihelion precession of Mercury. Seeliger proposed the same modification in a cosmological context. He proposed that the damping could explain why there is no collapse. Using astronomical data he estimated the constant to be about Λ=3.8•10^{-7}km^{-1}.

=== Charlier solution ===
In 1848, John Herschel in the context of Olbers' paradox, proposed that a non-uniform distribution of stars could explain it. In 1896, Carl Charlier considered that both Olber's paradox and Seeliger's paradox indicated that the universe was not finite. However, as an alternative he proposed in 1906 a hierarchical universe were lower star systems were separated from higher star systems in the hierarchy by increasingly larger distances. So that the total amount of light received from the infinite number of stars was reduced. He argued that this hierarchical universe also solved Seeliger's paradox.

Consider the Milky Way be formed of N_{1} stars be of hierarchical order S_{1}. Let also consider that N_{2} Milky Way-like galaxies form the next higher-oder S_{2}, then N_{3} of these form the next order S_{3}, and so on. Charlier showed that the mean density of stars was decreased by the radius R as
$$\rho\propto \frac{1}{R^\alpha}\;;\;\alpha>2$$
then the equality
$$\frac{R_{i+1}}{R_i}\geq \sqrt{N_{i+1}}$$
was satisfied. As a consequence, Charlier showed that Seeliger's paradox disappeared and there were no infinite velocities. In this model, universe is infinite but with average density zero. He also derived that the limiting angular diameter for the spiral nebula to be $\theta<N^{-1/6}$, from this he estimated angular diameter and apparent magnitude of the nearest spiral galaxy, which coincided with Andromeda Galaxy. Charlier hierarchical model was expanded further, even after Albert Einstein's cosmological models by Franz Selety (1922) and Ludwik Silberstein (1929).
