= Eureka: A Prose Poem =

1848 non-fiction work by Edgar Allan Poe

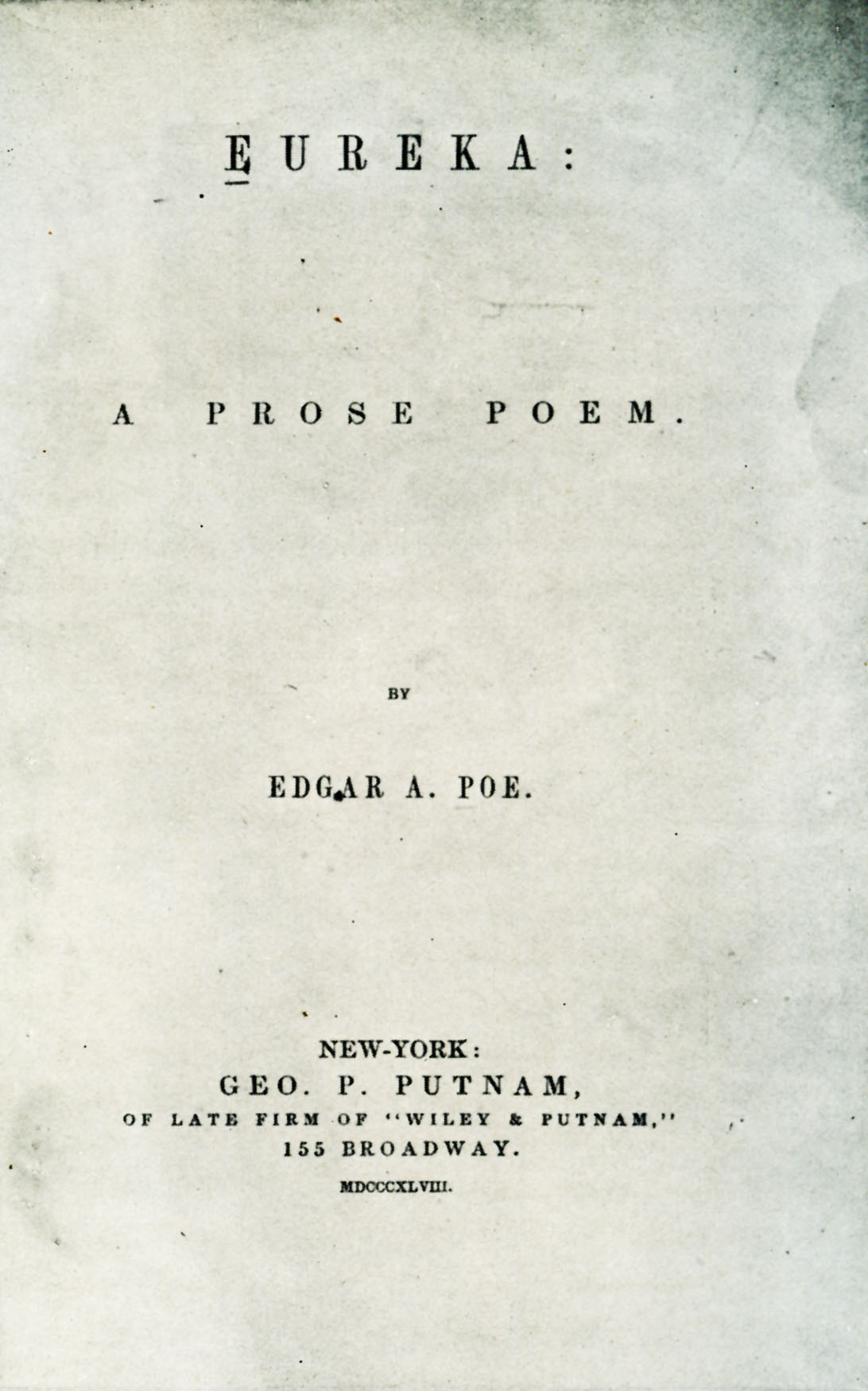
Title page from the first edition (1848)

Eureka is an 1848 lengthy non-fiction work by the American author Edgar Allan Poe (1809–1849) which he subtitled "A Prose Poem", though it has also been subtitled "An Essay on the Material and Spiritual Universe". Adapted from a lecture he had presented, Eureka describes Poe's intuitive conception of the nature of the universe, with no antecedent scientific work done to reach his conclusions. He also discusses man's relationship with God, whom he compares to an author. Eureka is dedicated to the German naturalist and explorer Alexander von Humboldt (1769–1859).

Though Eureka is generally considered a literary work, some of Poe's ideas anticipate 20th-century scientific discoveries and theories. Analysis of Eureka's scientific content shows congruities with modern cosmology, stemming from Poe's assumption of an evolving Universe.

In Poe's day, Eureka was received poorly and was generally described, even by friends, as absurd. Modern critics continue to debate the import of Eureka, and some doubt its seriousness, in part because of Poe's many incorrect assumptions and his comical references to historic thinkers. Poe calls Eureka a "poem", whereas many critics compare it with his fiction works, especially his science fiction stories such as "The Facts in the Case of M. Valdemar". Poe's attempts at discovering the truth follow his own tradition of "ratiocination", a term he had used in his detective fiction tales. His suggestion that the soul continues to thrive even after death parallels his writings in which characters reappear from beyond the grave, as in "Ligeia". The essay contains aspects of transcendentalism, despite Poe's disdain for that movement.

Poe considered Eureka his greatest work and claimed that it was more important than the discovery of gravity.

== Overview ==
To the few who love me and whom I love – to those who feel rather than to those who think – to the dreamers and those who put faith in dreams as in the only realities – I offer this Book of Truths, not in its character of Truth-Teller, but for the Beauty that abounds in its Truth; constituting it true. To these I present the composition as an Art-Product alone: let us say as a Romance; or, if I be not urging too lofty a claim, as a Poem.

— Preface to Eureka, by Edgar Allan Poe

Eureka is Poe's last major work and his longest non-fiction work, at nearly 40,000 words. The work had its origins in a lecture Poe presented on February 3, 1848, titled "On The Cosmography of the Universe", at the Society Library in New York. He had expected an audience of hundreds; only 60 people attended, and many reportedly were confused by the topic. Poe had hoped the profits from the lecture would cover expenses for the production of his new journal, The Stylus. Some reviews in the contemporary press offered lavish praise for the lecture, while others critiqued it harshly.

Eureka is Poe's attempt at explaining the universe, using his general proposition that "Because Nothing was, therefore All Things are". In Eureka, Poe discusses man's relationship to God and the universe or, as he offers at the beginning: "I design to speak of the Physical, Metaphysical and Mathematical – of the Material and Spiritual Universe: of its Essence, its Origin, its Creation, its Present Condition and its Destiny". In keeping with this design, Poe concludes "that space and duration are one" and that matter and spirit are made of the same essence. Poe suggests that people have a natural tendency to believe in themselves as infinite with nothing greater than their soul—such thoughts stem from man's residual feelings from when each shared an original identity with God. Ultimately individual consciousnesses will collapse back into a similar single mass, a "final ingathering" where the "myriads of individual Intelligences become blended". Likewise, Poe saw the universe itself as infinitely expanding and contracting like a divine heartbeat which constantly rejuvenates itself, also implying a sort of deathlessness. In fact, because the soul is a part of this constant throbbing, after dying, all people, in essence, become God.

== Publication history ==
Eureka was published in a small hardcover edition in March 1848 by Wiley & Putnam, priced at 75 cents. Poe persuaded George Palmer Putnam – who had previously taken a chance on Poe by printing his only novel, The Narrative of Arthur Gordon Pym of Nantucket, in England – to publish Eureka, after Poe claimed Eureka to be more important than Isaac Newton's discovery of gravity. Putnam paid Poe fourteen dollars for the work.

Poe suggested an initial printing of at least one million copies; Putnam settled on 750, of which 500 were sold that year. Other accounts say that Poe requested 50,000 copies, and that 500 were printed. The publisher gave Poe the full $14 in advance.

Charles Baudelaire's French translation was published in Paris by Michel Levy in 1864.

== Analysis ==
Eureka presents themes and sentiments similar to some of those in Poe's fiction work, including attempts at breaking beyond the obstacle of death and specifically characters who return from death in stories like "The Fall of the House of Usher" and "Ligeia". Similar to his theories on a good short story, Poe believes the universe is a self-contained, closed system. In coming to his conclusions, Poe uses ratiocination as a literary device, through his character C. Auguste Dupin, as if Poe himself were a detective solving the mystery of the universe. Eureka, then, is the culmination of Poe's interest in capturing truth through language, an extension of his interest in cryptography.

Eureka seems to continue the science fiction traditions he had used in works like "MS. Found in a Bottle" and "The Facts in the Case of M. Valdemar". He further emphasizes the connection between his theory and fiction by saying that the universe itself is a written work: "The Universe is a plot of God", Poe says, and "the plots of God are perfect". Even so, Poe admits that the difficulty in explaining these theories comes in part from the limitations of language, often apologizing for or explaining his use of "common" or "vulgar" terms.

Poe's decision to call Eureka a "prose poem" goes against some of his own "rules" of poetry which he had laid out in "The Philosophy of Composition" and "The Poetic Principle". In particular, Poe had called the ideal poem short, at most 100 lines, and utilizing the "most poetical topic in the world": the death of a beautiful woman. Poe himself suggested that Eureka be judged only as a work of art, not of science – possibly dismissing the seriousness of Eureka. Though he is using mathematical and scientific terms, he may actually be talking about aesthetics and suggesting that there is a close connection between science and art. This is an ironic sentiment, considering his message in the poem "To Science", in which he had shown a distaste for modern science's encroachments on spirituality and the artist's imagination. In Eureka Poe also discusses several astronomy-related matters, including the speed of the stars, the diameters of planets and distances among them, the weight of Earth, and the orbit of the newly discovered "Leverrier's planet", later christened Neptune.

Eureka ventures into transcendentalism, relying strongly on intuition, a movement and practice he had despised. Though he criticized the transcendental movement for what he referred to as incoherent mysticism, Eureka is more mystical than most transcendental works. Eureka has also been compared to the theories of Mary Baker Eddy, founder of Christian Science, and Joseph Smith, founder of the Latter Day Saint movement.

The essay is written in a manner that anticipates its audience. For example, Poe uses more metaphors further into the work, in the belief that the reader becomes more interested. Poe's voice crescendos throughout, starting as the modest seeker of truth, moving on to the satirist of logic, and finally ending as the master scholar.

=== Allusions ===
- "Eureka" – The title, Greek for "I have found it", references the exclamation by Archimedes after taking a bath and discovering the concept of displacement.
- Epicurus – Poe refers to the ancient Greek philosopher, speaking of "Epicurean atoms". Epicurus believed that reality is composed solely of atoms, or indivisible units of mass, and void. It has been suggested that Poe's reference to the "false scientist" Epicurus indicates that Eureka is actually a satire.
- Aristotle – Poe refers to Plato's famous student as "Aries Tottle", who Poe writes is Turkish and produces his ideas from his nose like sneezes.
- Francis Bacon – The name "Hog" is a reference to the English philosopher and originator of the Baconian method.
- Euclid – Referred to as "Tuclid", a student of "Aries Tottle".
- Immanuel Kant – Poe describes Kant as the "Dutchman" who originated transcendentalism.

The comical presentation of these historic thinkers, including the puns on their names, suggests that Poe may have intended Eureka as a burlesque. Alternatively, his criticism of them might indicate Poe's need to challenge their conclusions before presenting his own.

== Influence and significance ==
Eureka has been read in many ways, in part because Poe's sincerity in the work is questionable. It has been considered prophetically scientific, intuitively romantic, and even calculatingly ironic. Lacking scientific proof, Poe said it was not his goal to prove what he says to be true, but to convince through suggestion.

Though modern critics have dismissed Eureka for having no scientific worth or merit, Poe's work presages modern science with his own concept of the Big Bang. He postulated that the universe began from a single originating particle or singularity, willed by a "Divine Volition". This "primordial particle", initiated by God, divides into all the particles of the universe. These particles seek one another because of their originating unity (gravity), resulting in the end of the universe as a single particle. Poe also expresses a cosmological theory that anticipated black holes and the Big Crunch theory, as well as the first plausible solution to Olbers' paradox (the night sky is dark despite the vast number of stars in the universe). In 1987 astronomer Edward Robert Harrison published a book, Darkness at Night, on this paradox; it clarified why insufficient energy explains the paradox, and lays out how Harrison discovered that Poe's Eureka anticipated this conclusion. A scientific reassessment of Eureka also emphasizes that Poe was the first person to conceive a Newtonian evolving universe in which nothing can stop stars or galaxies from collapsing on each other.

Many of Poe's conclusions, however, are speculative due to his rejection of analytic logic and emphasis on intuition and inspiration. Further, Eureka contains many scientific errors. In particular, Poe's suggestions opposed Newtonian principles regarding the density and rotation of planets. He also says that Johannes Kepler came to his conclusions not through science but through guesswork. For this reason, it has been suggested that what Poe claims in Eureka to be true, is not actually about this universe but about a parallel, fictitious one that Poe creates. If this is the case, as interpreted by poet Richard Wilbur, Poe is criticizing this world, suggesting that it has fallen away from God by elevating scientific reason above poetic intuition.

Some modern critics have suggested that Eureka is a sign of Poe's declining mental health at the end of his life. Astrophysicist Arthur Stanley Eddington has disputed this notion, declaring that "Eureka is not a work of dotage or disordered mind". In the text, Poe wrote that he was aware he might be considered a madman. The lecture on which the essay was based was delivered only a few days after the anniversary of his wife Virginia's death, suggesting a connection between that anniversary and his new theories. Poe seems to dismiss death in Eureka, thereby ignoring his own anxiety over the problem of death.

Some modern critics believe Eureka is the key to deciphering meaning in all of Poe's fiction – that all his works involve similar theories.

== Critical reception ==
Response to Eureka was overwhelmingly unfavorable. Poe's friend Marie Louise Shew, who had helped his wife Virginia on her deathbed, broke off their friendship, because it offended her religious beliefs.

After Eureka's publication, a vehement anonymous censure appeared in the Literary Review. Poe believed it to have been written by John Henry Hopkins Jr. (1820–1889), a young theology student who had previously criticized Eureka as pantheistic and "a damnable heresy" that "conscience would compel him to denounce". Literary critic George Edward Woodberry in 1885 thought the essay was based on a crude understanding of the science a student learns in school, "rendered ridiculous" by absurdity and the density of his ignorance.

Thomas Dunn English, a writer, lawyer, and physician who frequently criticized Poe, wrote an article for the John-Donkey headlined "Great Literary Crash". The article reported that a shelf of books had crashed because someone had "imprudently" stacked an edition of Eureka on it, and that it was a miracle that the whole building had not fallen down as a result.

The lecture on which Eureka was based also received negative reviews. Poe's friend Evert A. Duyckinck wrote his brother that the lecture had bored him to death and that it was "full of a ludicrous dryness of scientific phrase—a mountainous piece of absurdity". A local newspaper called it "hyperbolic nonsense", though one publication, the Courier and Enquirer, called it "a nobler effort than any other Mr. Poe has yet given the world". Audience members said it was not persuasive or was simply too long.

Even so, Poe considered Eureka his masterpiece. He believed it would immortalize him because it would be proven true. In the preface, Poe wrote: "It is as a Poem only that I wish this work to be judged after I am dead."

After its publication he wrote his aunt Maria Clemm: "I have no desire to live since I have done Eureka. I could accomplish nothing more." He confided in a friend that he believed his contemporary generation was unable to understand it but that it would be appreciated, if ever, two thousand years later.

Some critics, however, responded favorably to Eureka. French writer Paul Valéry praised it for both its poetic and scientific merit, calling it an abstract poem based on mathematical foundations. Albert Einstein, in a 1934 letter, wrote that Eureka was "a beautiful achievement of an unusually independent mind."^{α}

== See also ==
- Historic recurrence

== Notes ==
^α In the original German: "[...] eine schöne Leistung eines ungewöhnlich selbständigen Geistes."
