= Hugo von Seeliger =

German astronomer

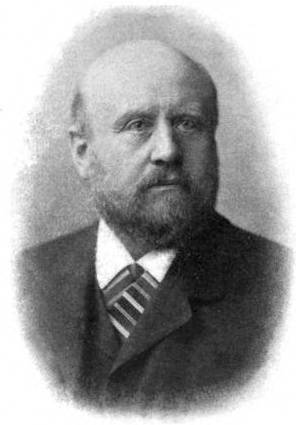
- Born: 23 September 1849; Biala, Kingdom of Galicia and Lodomeria, Austria-Hungary
- Died: 2 December 1924 (aged 75); Munich, German Reich
- Education: University of Leipzig
- Known for: Seeliger's paradox
- Scientific career
- Fields: Astronomy
- Workplaces: LMU Munich
- Doctoral advisor: Carl Christian Bruhns
- Doctoral students: Julius Bauschinger; Gustav Herglotz; George W. Myers; Karl Schwarzschild

Hugo von Seeliger (23 September 1849 – 2 December 1924), also known as Hugo Hans Ritter von Seeliger, was a German astronomer, often considered the most important astronomer of his day.

== Biography ==
He was born in Biala, completed high school in Teschen in 1867, and studied at the Universities of Heidelberg and Leipzig. He earned a doctorate in astronomy in 1872 from the latter, studying under Carl Christian Bruhns. He was on the staff of the University of Bonn Observatory until 1877, as an assistant to Friedrich Wilhelm Argelander. In 1874, he directed the German expedition to the Auckland Islands to observe the transit of Venus. In 1881, he became the Director of the Gotha Observatory, and in 1882 became a professor of Astronomy and Director of the Observatory at the Ludwig-Maximilians-Universität München (LMU Munich), which post he held until his death. His students included Hans Kienle, Ernst Anding, Julius Bauschinger, Paul ten Bruggencate, Gustav Herglotz, Richard Schorr, and especially Karl Schwarzschild, who earned a doctorate under him in 1898, and acknowledged Seeliger's influence in speeches throughout his career.

Seeliger was elected an Associate of the Royal Astronomical Society in 1892, and President of the Astronomische Gesellschaft from 1897 to 1921. He received numerous honours and medals, including knighthood (Ritter), between 1896 and 1917.

His contributions to astronomy include an explanation of the anomalous motion of the perihelion of Mercury (later one of the main tests of general relativity), a theory of nova coming from the collision of a star with a cloud of gas, and his confirmation of James Clerk Maxwell's theories of the composition of the rings of Saturn by studying variations in their albedo. He is also the discoverer of an apparent paradox in Newton's gravitational law, known as Seeliger's paradox. However, his main interest was in the stellar statistics of the Bonner Durchmusterung and Bonn section of the Astronomische Gesellschaft star catalogues, and in the conclusions these led about the structure of the universe. Seeliger's views on the dimensions of our galaxy were consistent with Jacobus Kapteyn's later studies.

Seeliger was an opponent of Albert Einstein's theory of relativity.

He continued his work until his death, on 2 December 1924, aged 75.

The asteroid 892 Seeligeria and the lunar crater Seeliger were named in his honour. The brightening of Saturn's rings at opposition is known as the Seeliger Effect, to acknowledge his pioneering research in this field. Minor planet 251 Sophia is named after his wife, Sophia.

== Students ==
His PhD students at Ludwig-Maximilians-Universität München were (after Mathematics Genealogy Project, Hugo Hans von Seeliger) :

- Julius Bauschinger (1884)
- Ernst Anding (1888)
- Richard Schorr (1889)
- Karl Oertel (1890)
- Oscar Hecker (1891)
- Adalbert Bock (1892)
- George Myers (1896)
- Karl Schwarzschild (1897)
- Lucian Grabowski (1900)
- Gustav Herglotz (1900)
- Emil Silbernagel (1905)
- Ernst Zapp (1907)
- Kasimir Jantzen (1912)
- Wilhelm Keil (1918)
- Friedrich Burmeister (1919)
- Gustav Schnauder (1921)
- Walter Sametinger (1924)
