= Upsilon Pegasi =

Aging giant star in the constellation Pegasus

- Location of υ Pegasi (circled)

Observation data Epoch J2000 Equinox ICRS
- Constellation: Pegasus
- Right ascension: 23^{h} 25^{m} 22.78350^{s}
- Declination: +23° 24′ 14.7606″
- Apparent magnitude (V): 4.40

Characteristics
- Evolutionary stage: subgiant
- Spectral type: F8III
- U−B color index: +0.14
- B−V color index: +0.61

Astrometry
Radial velocity (R_{v})	−8.59 km/s
Proper motion (μ)	RA: +192.19 mas/yr Dec.: +36.12 mas/yr
Parallax (π)	19.14±0.18 mas
Distance	170 ± 2 ly (52.2 ± 0.5 pc)
Absolute magnitude (M_{V})	0.83

Details
Mass	2.17 M_{☉}
Radius	5.97+0.36 −0.19 R_{☉}
Luminosity	43.2±0.8 L_{☉}
Surface gravity (log g)	3.22 cgs
Temperature	6,061+97 −176 K
Metallicity [Fe/H]	−0.01 dex
Rotational velocity (v sin i)	73.4 km/s

Other designations
- Alkarab, υ Peg, 68 Pegasi, BD+22°4833, FK5 881, GC 32585, HD 220657, HIP 115623, HR 8905, SAO 91253

Database references
SIMBAD	data

Upsilon Pegasi, Latinised from υ Pegasi, is a star within the great square in the northern constellation of Pegasus. It has the proper name Alkarab /ˈælkəræb/. This object has a yellow-white hue and is faintly visible to the naked eye with an apparent magnitude of 4.40. It is located at a distance of approximately 170 light-years from the Sun based on parallax, but is drifting closer with a radial velocity of −8.6 km/s. The star is moving through the galaxy at a speed of 50.6 km/s relative to the Sun. Its projected galactic orbit carries it between 18,600 and 26,300 light-years from the center of the galaxy.

This object is an aging giant star with a stellar classification of F8III. It is currently in the Hertzsprung gap and is a source of X-ray emission. The star has 2.2 times the mass of the Sun and is spinning with a projected rotational velocity of 73.4 km/s. It has an iron abundance of −0.01 dex, or 97.7% of the Sun's. Upsilon Pegasi has six times the girth of the Sun and is radiating 43 times the Sun's luminosity at an effective temperature of 6,061 K.

== Nomenclature ==
υ Pegasi is the star's Bayer designation. The star bore the traditional Arabic name Al Karab ("the Bucket-rope"). In 2016, the IAU organized a Working Group on Star Names (WGSN) to catalog and standardize proper names for stars. The WGSN approved the name Alkarab for this star on 5 September 2017 and it is now so included in the List of IAU-approved Star Names.
