= Johann Bauschinger =

German mathematician and builder (1834–1893)

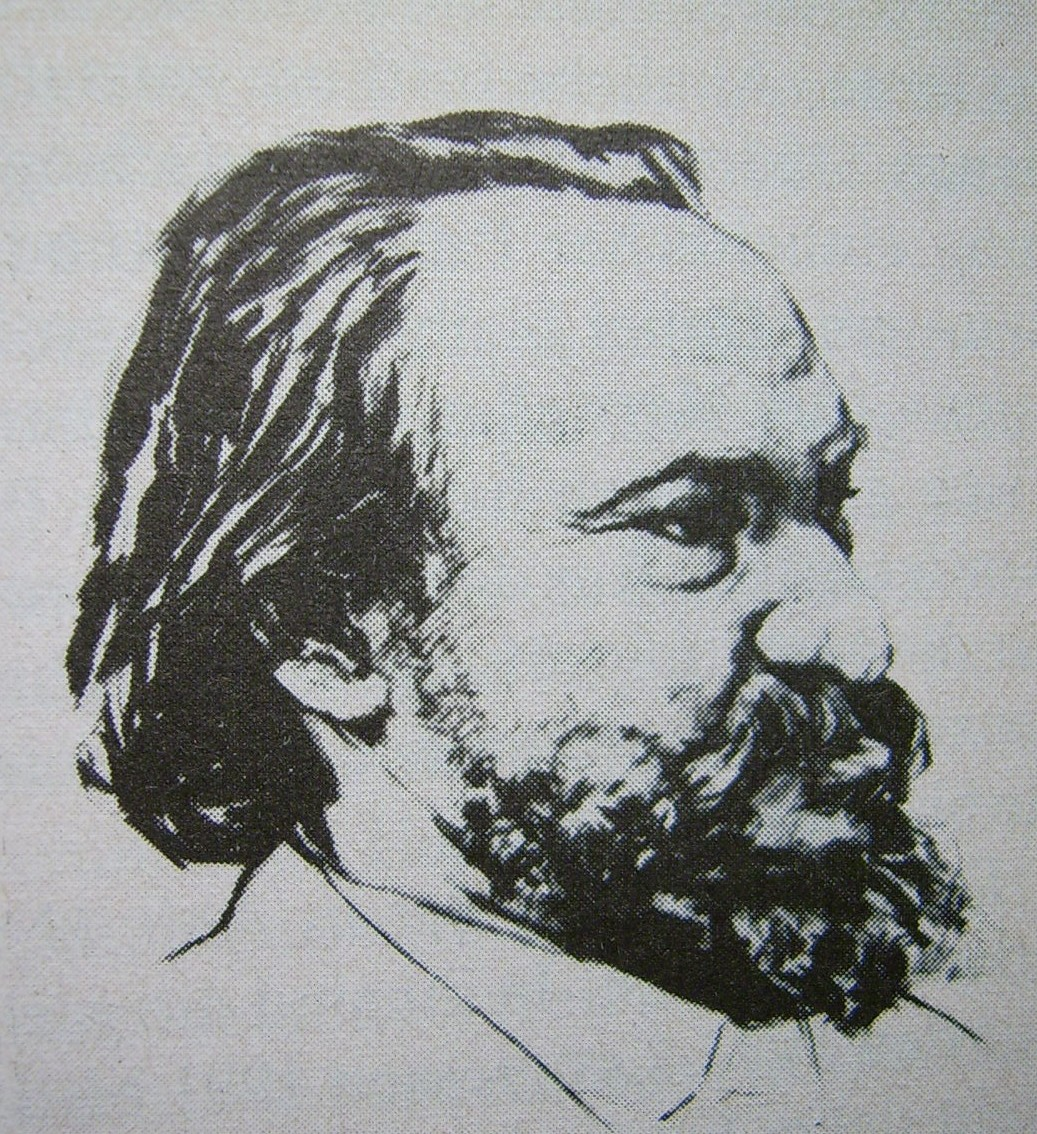

Johann Bauschinger (11 June 1834, in Nuremberg – 25 November 1893, in Munich) was a mathematician, builder, and professor of Engineering Mechanics at Munich Polytechnic, from 1868 until his death. The Bauschinger effect in materials science is named after him. He was also the father of astronomer Julius Bauschinger (1860–1934).
