= Olbers' paradox =

Argument in astrophysics against the theory of an unchanging universe

As more distant stars are revealed in this animation depicting an infinite, homogeneous, and static universe, they fill the gaps between closer stars. Olbers' paradox says that because the night sky is dark, at least one of these three assumptions must be false.

Olbers' paradox, also known as the dark night paradox or Olbers and Cheseaux's paradox, is a historical argument in astrophysics and physical cosmology that says the darkness of the night sky conflicts with the assumption of an infinite and eternal static universe. If the universe were static, homogeneous at a large scale, and populated by an infinite number of stars, any line of sight from Earth must end at the surface of a star and if light from an infinite distance could reach Earth, the night sky should be completely illuminated and very bright. This contradicts the observed darkness and non-uniformity of the night sky. Modern cosmological models do not make all of these assumptions.

The darkness of the night sky is one piece of evidence for a dynamic universe, such as the Big Bang model. That model explains the observed darkness by invoking expansion of the universe, which increases the wavelength of visible light originating from the Big Bang to microwave scale via a process known as redshift. The resulting microwave radiation background has wavelengths much longer (millimeters instead of nanometers), which appear dark to the naked eye. Although he was not the first to describe it, the paradox is popularly named after the German astronomer Heinrich Wilhelm Olbers (1758–1840).

== History ==
=== Statement ===
Edward Robert Harrison's Darkness at Night: A Riddle of the Universe (1987) gives an account of the dark night sky paradox, seen as a problem in the history of science. According to Harrison, the first to conceive of anything like the paradox was Thomas Digges, who was also the first to expound the Copernican system in English and also postulated an infinite universe with infinitely many stars. Johannes Kepler also posed the problem in 1610, and the paradox took its mature form in the 18th-century work of Edmond Halley and Jean-Philippe Loys de Cheseaux. The paradox is commonly attributed to the German amateur astronomer Heinrich Wilhelm Olbers, who described it in 1823, but Harrison points out that Olbers was far from the first to pose the problem, nor was his thinking about it particularly valuable.

=== Solution ===
Edgar Allan Poe's essay Eureka (1848) anticipated some qualitative aspects of the solution, saying:

Were the succession of stars endless, then the background of the sky would present us a uniform luminosity, like that displayed by the Galaxy – since there could be absolutely no point, in all that background, at which would not exist a star. The only mode, therefore, in which, under such a state of affairs, we could comprehend the voids which our telescopes find in innumerable directions, would be by supposing the distance of the invisible background so immense that no ray from it has yet been able to reach us at all.

The first to publish a solution in scientific literature was Johann Heinrich von Mädler in 1858, suggesting that a finite age universe could resolve the paradox. Mädler's work was popularized by Frederik Kaiser in his 1860 popular science book.

Harrison argues that the first to set out a satisfactory mathematical resolution of the paradox was Lord Kelvin, in a little-known 1901 paper. Kelvin did not cite Olbers or Chesseux, and was unaware of Mädler's solution. Kelvin resolution was popularized by Harlow Shapley and quickly became the standard solution to the issue.

== Paradox and resolution ==
The paradox is that a static, infinitely old universe with an infinite number of stars distributed in an infinitely large space would be bright rather than dark. The paradox comes in two forms: flux within the universe and the brightness along any line of sight. The two forms have different resolutions.

A view of a square section of four concentric shells

=== Flux form ===
The flux form can be shown by dividing the universe into a series of concentric shells, 1 light year thick. For example, one shell would stretch from 1,000,000,000 to 1,000,000,001 light years away. A certain number of stars will be in each shell. If the universe is homogeneous at a large scale, then there would be four times as many stars in a shell twice as far away, between 2,000,000,000 and 2,000,000,001 light years away. However, since the second shell is twice as far away, each star in it would appear one quarter as bright as the stars in the first shell. Thus the total light received from the second shell is the same as the total light received from the first shell. Thus each shell of a given thickness will produce the same net amount of light regardless of how far away it is. The light of each shell adds to the total amount. Thus the more shells, the more light; and with infinitely many shells, there would be an infinitely bright night sky.

If intervening gas is added to this infinite model, the light from distant stars will be absorbed. However, that absorption will heat the gas, and over time the gas itself will begin to radiate. With this added feature, the sky would not be infinitely bright, but every point in the sky would still be like the surface of a star.

Another way to describe the flux version is to suppose that the universe were not expanding and always had the same stellar density; then the temperature of the universe would continually increase as the stars put out more radiation. After something like 10^{23} years, the universe would reach the average surface temperature of a star.

The flux form of the paradox is resolved because the flux is not infinite: the number of visible stars is limited by the age of the universe.

=== Line-of-sight form ===
The line-of-sight version of the paradox starts by imagining a line in any direction in an infinite Euclidean universe. In such universe, the line would terminate on a star, and thus all of the night sky should be filled with light. This version is known to be correct, but the result is different in our expanding universe governed by general relativity. The termination point is on the surface of last scattering where light from the Big Bang first emerged. This light is dramatically redshifted from the energy similar to star surfaces down to 2.73 K. Such light is invisible to human observers on Earth.

Recent observations suggest that the estimated number of galaxies based on direct observations is too low by a factor of ten. However this does not materially alter the resolution of the paradox. A full explanation involves a combination of finite age and redshifts, and UV absorption by hydrogen followed by re-emission in near-IR wavelengths also plays a role.

== Alternative solutions ==
=== Hierarchical universe ===
In 1848, John Herschel considered that Olbers' paradox could be resolved if stars were distributed non-uniformily. One possibility consists in creating a hierarchical scale distribution. Richard A. Proctor proposed this idea in 1870 in his book Other Worlds than Ours. In his model, lower star systems were separated from hierarchical higher star systems by increasing distances such that the light received from the whole universe was increasingly small. In 1896, Carl Charlier argued that Olbers' paradox and Seeliger's paradox indicated that the universe was finite, yet conceded that a hierarchical model could be an alternative. In 1908, Charlier published a mathematical model for the hierarchical cosmology where the density of stars decreases rapidly with distance and concluded that it allowed for an infinite time universe.

After the development of Einstein's cosmology, physicists like Franz Selety in 1922 and Ludwik Silberstein in 1929, continued to develop and support hierarchical models as an alternative.

=== Steady state ===
The redshift hypothesised in the Big Bang model would by itself explain the darkness of the night sky even if the universe were infinitely old. In the Steady state theory the universe is infinitely old and uniform in time as well as space. There is no Big Bang in this model, but there are stars and quasars at arbitrarily great distances. The expansion of the universe causes the light from these distant stars and quasars to redshift, so that the total light flux from the sky remains finite. Thus the observed radiation density (the sky brightness of extragalactic background light) can be independent of finiteness of the universe. Mathematically, the total electromagnetic energy density (radiation energy density) in thermodynamic equilibrium from Planck's law is

$$u(T) = {U(T)\over V} = \int_0^\infty \frac{8 \pi h \nu^3}{c^3} \frac{1}{e^{\frac{h \nu}{k_B T}} - 1} \, d\nu =\frac{8\pi^5(kT)^4}{15 (hc)^3},$$

e.g. for temperature 2.7 K it is 40 fJ/m^{3} ... 4.5×10^{−31} kg/m^{3} and for visible temperature 6000 K we get 1 J/m^{3} ... 1.1×10^{−17} kg/m^{3}. But the total radiation emitted by a star (or other cosmic object) is at most equal to the total nuclear binding energy of isotopes in the star. For the density of the observable universe of about 4.6×10^{−28} kg/m^{3} and given the known abundance of the chemical elements, the corresponding maximal radiation energy density of 9.2×10^{−31} kg/m^{3}, i.e. temperature 3.2 K (matching the value observed for the optical radiation temperature by Arthur Eddington). This is close to the summed energy density of the cosmic microwave background (CMB) and the cosmic neutrino background. However, the steady-state model does not predict the angular distribution of the microwave background temperature accurately (as the standard ΛCDM paradigm does).

== See also ==
- Heat death paradox
- List of paradoxes
- Horizon problem
