= 892 Seeligeria =

Main-belt asteroid

Discovery
- Discovered by: M. F. Wolf
- Discovery site: Heidelberg Obs.
- Discovery date: 31 May 1918

Designations
- Alternative designations: 1918 DR
- Minor planet category: main-belt · (outer); Alauda

Orbital characteristics
- Epoch 31 July 2016 (JD 2457600.5)
- Uncertainty parameter 0
- Observation arc: 97.87 yr (35747 days)
- Aphelion: 3.5632 AU (533.05 Gm)
- Perihelion: 2.8970 AU (433.39 Gm)
- Semi-major axis: 3.2301 AU (483.22 Gm)
- Eccentricity: 0.10312
- Orbital period (sidereal): 5.81 yr (2120.4 d)
- Mean anomaly: 83.4390°
- Mean motion: 0° 10^{m} 11.208^{s} / day
- Inclination: 21.335°
- Longitude of ascending node: 175.926°
- Argument of perihelion: 287.377°
- Earth MOID: 1.98994 AU (297.691 Gm)
- Jupiter MOID: 1.66162 AU (248.575 Gm)
- T_{Jupiter}: 3.071

Physical characteristics
- Mean radius: 38.01±0.8 km
- Synodic rotation period: 15.78 h, 41.40 h (1.725 d)
- Geometric albedo: 0.0485±0.002
- Absolute magnitude (H): 9.7

892 Seeligeria is dark Alauda asteroid from the outer region of the asteroid belt that was discovered by German astronomer Max Wolf on May 31, 1918 in Heidelberg and assigned a preliminary designation of 1918 DR. It was named after German astronomer Hugo Hans von Seeliger.

Photometric observations at the Oakley Observatory in Terre Haute, Indiana, during 2007 were used to build a light curve for 892 Seeligeria. The asteroid displayed a rotation period of 15.78 ± 0.04 hours and a brightness variation of 0.35 ± 0.07 in magnitude.

Seeligeria is a member of the Alauda family (902), a large family of typically bright carbonaceous asteroids and named after its parent body, 702 Alauda.
