= Julius Bauschinger =

German astronomer (1860–1934)

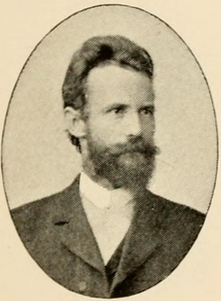

Julius Bauschinger (28 January 1860 – 21 January 1934) was a German astronomer.

== Biography ==
Julius Bauschinger was born in Fürth, the son of the physicist Johann Bauschinger. He studied at the Universities of Munich and Berlin, graduating under the direction of Hugo Hans von Seeliger with a thesis titled "Studies on the motion of the planet Mercury" (1884). In 1882, he was part of a German expedition to Hartford, Connecticut, in order to observe the transit of Venus.

From 1883, he was assistant and observer at the Munich observatory. In 1896, he was named director of the Astronomisches Rechen-Institut and professor of theoretical astronomy in Berlin, a position he held until 1909, when he became director of the Strasbourg observatory.

Bauschinger was dissertation advisor for Alfred Wegener's 1905 doctoral thesis in astronomy.

From 1920 to 1930, he directed the Leipzig observatory. He died in Munich in 1934.

== Minor planet ==
The minor planet 2306 Bauschinger, discovered in 1939, has been named after Bauschinger.

== Selected works ==
=== Main publications ===
- Julius Bauschinger: Untersuchungen über die Bewegung des Planeten Merkur, 1884 (thesis)
- Julius Bauschinger: Ueber die Biegung von Meridianfernrohren, 1888 (inaugural thesis, review in Bulletin Astronomique, Série I, vol. 5, pp. 298–301)
- H. Seeliger and Julius Bauschinger: Erstes Münchener Sternverzeichniss : enthaltend die mittleren Örter von 33082 Sternen, 1890
- Julius Bauschinger: Ueber die Biegung von Meridianfernrohren, Neue Annalen der Koeniglichen Sternwarte in Bogenhausen bei Muenchen, vol. 2, pp.D1-D18.2, 1891,
- Julius Bauschinger: Zweites Münchener Sternverzeichniss, enthaltend die mittleren Oerter von 13200 Sternen, für das Aequinoctium 1880, Munich, 1891 (review in Bull. Amer. Math. Soc. 2 (1892), 46-48)
- Julius Bauschinger: Ausgleichsrechnung, Enzyklopädie der mathematischen Wissenschaften, volume 1-2, pages 768-798, 1900
- Julius Bauschinger: Interpolation, volume 1-2, pages 799-820, 1901
- Julius Bauschinger: Tafeln zur theoretischen Astronomie, 1901 (1st edition), 1934 (2nd edition)
- Julius Bauschinger: Bahnbestimmung der Himmelskörper, 1906 (1st edition), 1928 (2nd edition)
- Julius Bauschinger and Jean Peters: Logarithmisch-trigonometrische Tafeln mit acht Dezimalstellen, 1910, 1911 (2 volumes), 2nd edition in 1936 (with an additional English introduction as a separate brochure), 3rd edition in 1958,
- Julius Bauschinger: Bestimmung und Zusammenhang der Astronomischen Konstanten, Enzyklopädie der mathematischen Wissenschaften, volume 6-2-1, pages 844-896, 1919
- Julius Bauschinger: Rotation der Himmelskörper, Enzyklopädie der mathematischen Wissenschaften, volume 6-2-1, pages 995-1019, 1923

=== Secondary publications ===
- publications at the Astronomisches Rechen-Institut:
- Julius Bauschinger: Zur Frage über die Bewegung des Mercurperihels, Astronomische Nachrichten, volume 109, columns 27-32, 1884
- Julius Bauschinger: Über die Münchener Sterne der Bonner Südlichen Durchmusterung, Astronomische Nachrichten, volume 126, columns 319-322, 1891
- Julius Bauschinger: Ephemeride für den periodischen Cometen Brooks (1889 V), Astronomische Nachrichten, volume 141, 1896, columns 301-302
- Julius Bauschinger: Ephemeride für den periodischen Cometen Brooks (1889 V) 1896 VI, Astronomische Nachrichten, volume 142, number 18, 1897, columns 283-284
- Julius Bauschinger and P. V. Neugebauer: Tabellen zur Geschichte und Statistik der kleinen Planeten, Veröffentlichungen des Königlichen Astronomischen Rechen-Instituts zu Berlin, number 16, 1901, pages 1–16
- Julius Bauschinger: Abhandlungen zur Bahnbestimmung der Cometen : (1772) Insigniores orbitae Cometarum proprietates (1761); Observations sur l'Orbite apparante des Comètes (1771) / J. H. Lambert, 1902 (German edition)
- Gottfried Zedler, Julius Bauschinger, and Edward Schröder: Die älteste Gutenbergtype, Mainz, 1902
- Julius Bauschinger: Numerierung neu entdeckter Planeten, Astronomische Nachrichten, volume 167, number 16, 1905, columns 267-268
- Julius Bauschinger: Bahnen neu entdeckter Planeten, Astronomische Nachrichten, volume 167, number 16, 1905, columns 267-272
- Julius Bauschinger: Numerierung neuentdeckter kleiner Planeten, Astronomische Nachrichten, volume 169, 1905, columns 285-286
- Julius Bauschinger: Vorläufige Elemente neuentdeckter kleiner Planeten, Astronomische Nachrichten, volume 174, 1907, columns 53-56
- many other articles here
