= Friedrich Burmeister (geophysicist) =

German geophysicist

Friedrich Burmeister (1890–1969) was a German geophysicist. He was director of the Geomagnetic Observatory of the Ludwig-Maximilians-Universität München.

Burmeister studied mathematics and physics at the Ludwig-Maximilians-Universität München under Hugo von Seeliger and Arnold Sommerfeld, and he received his doctorate in 1919. Upon graduation, he became Director of the Munich Geomagnetic Observatory, of the Geomagnetism Branch of the Munich Earth Observatory, under the Geophysics Department of Earth and Environmental Sciences, at the Ludwig-Maximilians-Universität München. Due to the industrialization of Munich, operation of the observatory became more and more difficult, so, in 1927, the Munich Geomagnetic Observatory was closed and moved to a village 25 kilometers west of Munich, and it became the Maisach Geomagnetic Observatory. Due to the construction of a large military air base near Maisach, this facility was closed on October 31, 1937. It was moved to a small town west of Munich, and it became the Fürstenfeldbruck Geomagnetic Observatory where measurements began on 1 January 1939 under Burmeister as its inaugural director. Burmeister retired as director of the observatory in 1958, whereupon Karl Wienert was appointed to the position.

== Works ==
- Richard Bock, F. Burmeister, Friedrich Errulat: Magnetische Reichsvermesung 1935. O.T. 1. (Tabellen) (Akademie-Verlag, 1948)
