= Bauschinger effect =

Stress characteristics of materials

The Bauschinger effect.

The Bauschinger effect refers to a property of materials where the material's stress/strain characteristics change as a result of the microscopic stress distribution of the material. For example, an increase in tensile yield strength occurs at the expense of compressive yield strength. The effect is named after German engineer Johann Bauschinger.

While more tensile cold working increases the tensile yield strength, the local initial compressive yield strength after tensile cold working is actually reduced. The greater the tensile cold working, the lower the compressive yield strength.

It is a general phenomenon found in most polycrystalline metals. Based on the cold work structure, two types of mechanisms are generally used to explain the Bauschinger effect:

1. Local back stresses may be present in the material, which assist the movement of dislocations in the reverse direction. The pile-up of dislocations at grain boundaries and Orowan loops around strong precipitates are two main sources of these back stresses.
2. When the strain direction is reversed, dislocations of the opposite sign can be produced from the same source that produced the slip-causing dislocations in the initial direction. Dislocations with opposite signs can attract and annihilate each other. Since strain hardening is related to an increased dislocation density, reducing the number of dislocations reduces strength.

The net result is that the yield strength for strain in the opposite direction is less than it would be if the strain had continued in the initial direction.

== Mechanism of action ==
The Bauschinger effect is primarily attributed to the interaction between dislocations and the internal stress fields within the material. Initially, as external stress is applied, dislocations are generated and traverse the crystal lattice, creating internal stress fields. These fields, in turn, interact with the applied stress, leading to a phenomenon known as work hardening or strain hardening. With the accumulation of dislocations, the material's yield strength rises, hindering further plastic deformation. When stresses are applied in the reverse direction, the dislocations are now aided by the back stresses that were present at the dislocation barriers previously and also because the back stresses at the dislocation barriers in the back are not likely to be strong compared to the previous case. Hence the dislocations glide easily, resulting in lower yield stress for plastic deformation for reversed direction of loading.

Bauschinger effect, varies in magnitude based on factors like material composition, crystal structure, and prior plastic deformation. Materials with a higher density of dislocations and more internal stress fields tend to exhibit a more obvious Bauschinger effect. Additionally, the Bauschinger effect often accompanies other phenomena, such as Permanent Softening and Transient effects.

There is also a considerable amount of contribution of residual lattice stresses/strains to the Bauschinger Effect in materials that is associated with anisotropy in deformation. During loading-unloading cycles, dislocations do not return to their original position after unloading, which leaves residual strains in the lattice. These strains interact with stresses applied in the opposite direction which affect the materials response to subsequent loading-unloading cycles. The biggest effect observed is plastic yield asymmetry wherein the material will yield at different values in different loading directions.

There are three types of residual stresses - type I, type II and type III that contribute to the Bauschinger effect in polycrystalline materials. Type I residual stresses arise during manufacturing due to thermal gradients and usually self-equilibrate over the length comparable to the macroscopic dimension of the material. So, they do not contribute significantly to the Bauschinger effect.

However, type II stresses equilibrate at the grain size scale and thus, contribute significantly to the Bauschinger effect. They result from strain incompatibility between neighboring grains due to plastic and elastic anisotropy. Thus, they are responsible to change the material's yield behavior along different directions by affecting dislocation motion along these differently oriented grains. Type III stresses on the other hand arise due to mismatch between the soft matrix material and hard precipitates or dislocation cell walls (microstructural elements). They last over extremely short distances but significantly affect areas having microstructural heterogeneity. Dislocations pile-ups or stress concentration at the grain boundaries are examples of these types of residual stresses.

As a whole, these three types of residual stresses impact properties like strength, flexibility, fatigue and durability. Thus, understanding the mechanism of residual stresses is important to mitigate the influence of the Bauschinger effect.

== Consequence of the Bauschinger effect ==
Metal forming operations result in situations exposing the metal workpiece to stresses of reversed sign. The Bauschinger effect contributes to work softening of the workpiece, for example in straightening of drawn bars or rolled sheets, where rollers subject the workpiece to alternate bending stresses, thereby reducing the yield strength and enabling greater cold drawability of the workpiece.

== Implications ==
The Bauschinger effect have the applications in various fields due to its implications for the mechanical behavior of metallic materials subjected to cyclic loading. It is particularly relevant in applications involving cyclic loading or loading with changes in stress direction, facilitating the design and optimization of engineering structures.

Seismic Analysis: Earthquake engineering and seismic design are crucial aspects of geology engineering. During earthquakes, structural components endure alternating stress directions, with the Bauschinger effect influencing material response, energy dissipation, and potential damage accumulation. The Giuffré-Menegotto-Pinto model is widely utilized to accurately predict the seismic performance of structures by incorporating the Bauschinger effect. This model introduces a transition curve in the stress-strain relationship to capture both the Bauschinger effect and the pinching behavior observed in reinforced concrete structures under cyclic loading.

Fatigue Life Prediction: Researchers have developed methods and models to incorporate the Bauschinger effect into fatigue life prediction techniques, such as the strain-life and energy-based approaches. This plays a pivotal role in predicting and designing the fatigue life of machinery, vehicles, and engineering structures. A clear understanding of the Bauschinger effect ensures accurate predictions, enhancing the reliability and safety of components subjected to cyclic loading conditions.

The strain-life approach correlates the plastic strain amplitude with the number of cycles to failure, while the energy-based approach considers plastic strain energy as a driving force for fatigue damage accumulation. These models integrate the Bauschinger effect by adjusting the calculation of plastic strain energy or introducing additional energy terms to address the asymmetry in hysteresis loops caused by the effect.

Aerospace and Automotive Engineering: In aerospace engineering, materials undergo repeated loading cycles during flight, leading to fatigue and deformation. Similarly, in the automotive industry, vehicles endure cyclic loading due to road conditions and operations. Understanding the Bauschinger effect is crucial for predicting material behavior under such conditions and designing components with improved fatigue resistance. Research in this domain focuses on characterizing the Bauschinger effect in alloys and developing predictive models to assess fatigue life, ensuring structural integrity and reliability.

Metal Forming: The Bauschinger effect significantly influences the material's flow behavior, strain distribution, and required forming loads during these processes. Hence, understanding the Bauschinger effect is significant for optimizing forming processes, predicting material behavior.

== Mitigation of the Bauschinger effect ==
To mitigate the influence of the Bauschinger effect and enhance the performance of metallic materials, several strategies and techniques have been developed, including heat and surface treatments, the use of composite materials, and composition optimization.

Surface Treatment: This method aims to alleviate the Bauschinger effect by changing the surface properties of metallic materials. Common treatments include creating a protective layer or modifying the surface microstructure through processes such as physical vapor deposition (PVD) coatings. This treatment reduces the Bauschinger effect in the near-surface regions. Another effective approach is shot peening, where high-velocity particles impact the material's surface, inducing compressive residual stresses. These stresses counteract the internal tensile stresses associated with the Bauschinger effect to reduce its impact.

Heat Treatment: Heat treatment and thermomechanical processing are widely used to mitigate the Bauschinger effect by relieving residual stresses and dislocation structures within the material. Stress relief annealing is a common approach, where the material is heated to a specific temperature and held for a certain duration, allowing dislocations to rearrange and internal stresses to dissipate. This process reduces the Bauschinger effect by minimizing internal stress fields and achieving a more uniform distribution of dislocations.

Composition Optimization and Composite Materials: Optimizing material composition is another effective approach for mitigation, as certain compositions and microstructures exhibit reduced Bauschinger effect. Materials with high stacking fault energy, such as aluminum alloys and austenitic stainless steels, tend to show less pronounced Bauschinger effect due to their enhanced ability to accommodate dislocations. Additionally, hybrid and composite materials offer mitigation potential. Metal-matrix composites (MMCs), for instance, consist of a metallic matrix reinforced with ceramic particles or fibers, which can reduce the Bauschinger effect by constraining dislocation motion in the matrix. Moreover, laminated or graded composite structures strategically combine different materials to mitigate the Bauschinger effect in critical regions while maintaining desired properties elsewhere.

== See also ==
- Backlash, a similar extrinsic behavior in large-scale mechanical systems.
- Fatigue
