= Pilot certification in the United States =

Pilot certification

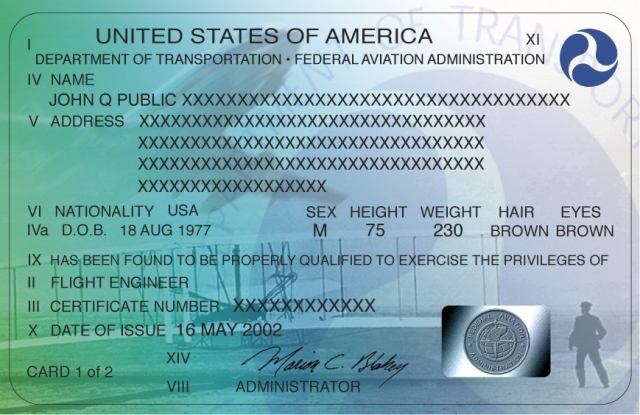
Front side of an airman certificate issued by the FAA.

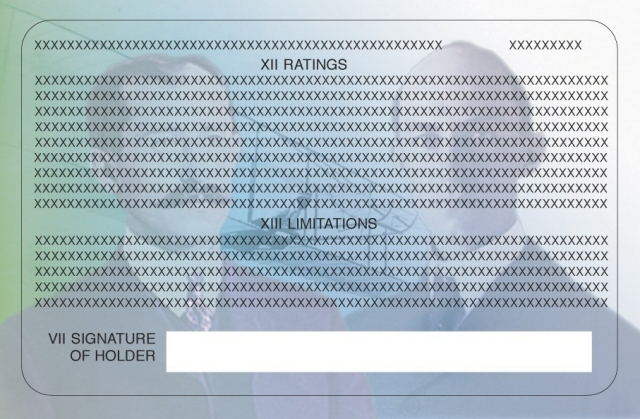
Back side of an airman certificate issued by the FAA.

In the United States, pilots must be certified to fly most aircraft. The Federal Aviation Administration (FAA), part of the U.S. Department of Transportation (USDOT), regulates certification to ensure safety and standardization. Pilots can earn certification under Title 14 of the Code of Federal Regulations (14 CFR) Part 61 or, if attending an approved school, under 14 CFR Part 141. Those operating commercial drones must obtain certification under 14 CFR Part 107.

An FAA-issued pilot certificate grants official authorization to operate an aircraft. However, it is just one of several kinds of airman certificates issued by the FAA to aviation professionals. The FAA also certifies flight engineers, flight instructors, ground instructors, flight dispatchers, aircraft maintenance technicians, parachute riggers, air traffic controllers, flight navigators, and flight attendants.

== General structure of certification ==
A pilot is certificated to fly aircraft at one or more named privilege levels and, at each privilege level, rated to fly aircraft of specific categories. Privilege levels of pilot certificates are, in order of increasing privilege:

- Student Pilot: an individual who is learning to fly under the tutelage of a flight instructor and who is permitted to fly alone under specific, limited circumstances
- Sport Pilot: an individual who is authorized to fly only Light-sport Aircraft
- Remote Pilot: an individual who may fly small Unmanned Aerial Vehicles (UAV) for compensation or hire
- Recreational Pilot: an individual who may fly aircraft of up to 180 horsepower (130 kW) and 4 seats in the daytime for pleasure only
- Private Pilot: an individual who may fly for pleasure or personal business, generally without accepting compensation
- Commercial Pilot: an individual who may, with some restrictions, fly for compensation or hire
- Airline Transport Pilot (often called ATP): an individual authorized to act as pilot for a scheduled airline. (First Officers that fly under 14CFR 121 are required to hold an Airline Transport Pilot Certificate as of August 1, 2013.)

Pilots can be rated in these aircraft categories:

- Airplane
- Rotorcraft
- Glider
- Lighter-than-air
- Powered lift
- Powered parachute
- Weight-shift control

Most aircraft categories are further broken down into classes. If a category is so divided, a pilot must hold a class rating to operate an aircraft in that class:

- The Airplane category is divided into single-engine land (ASEL), multi-engine land (AMEL), single-engine sea (ASES), and multi-engine sea (AMES) classes
- The Rotorcraft category is divided into helicopter and gyroplane classes
- The Lighter-than-air category is divided into airship and balloon classes
- The Powered parachute category is divided into powered parachute land and powered parachute sea
- The Weight-shift-control category is divided into weight-shift-control land and weight-shift-control sea

A student pilot certificate does not list category or class ratings but is instead endorsed by a flight instructor to confer privileges in specific makes and models of aircraft.

A type rating is required in a specific make and model of aircraft if the aircraft weighs more than 12,500 lb (5,700 kg) at takeoff, is powered by one or more turbojet engines, or is otherwise designated as requiring a type rating. The Boeing 747, Beechcraft Super King Air 350, and the Hawker Hunter are examples of aircraft that require type ratings.

To legally operate under instrument flight rules (IFR), a pilot can separately add an instrument rating to a private or commercial certificate. An airline transport pilot implicitly holds an instrument rating, so the instrument rating does not appear on an ATP certificate. The FAA issues instrument ratings separately for airplane and powered lift categories and the helicopter class (INSTA and INSTH). Glider and airship pilots may also operate under Instrument Flight Rules under certain circumstances. An individual may hold only one pilot certificate at one time; that certificate may authorize multiple privilege levels distinguished by aircraft category, class or type. For example, an Airline Transport Pilot certificate holder may be permitted to exercise ATP privileges when flying multi-engine land airplanes, but only Commercial Pilot privileges when flying single-engine land airplanes and gliders. Similarly a Commercial Pilot holder with a glider rating may have only Private Pilot privileges for single-engine land airplanes.

The FAA may impose limitations on a pilot certificate if, during training or the practical test, the pilot does not demonstrate all skills necessary to exercise all privileges of a privilege level, category, class or type rating. For example, a holder of a DC-3 type rating who does not demonstrate instrument flying skills during the practical test would be assigned a limitation reading, "DC-3 (VFR Only)".

To obtain a certificate or add a rating, a pilot usually has to undergo a course of training with a Certificated Flight Instructor (CFI) under 14CFR61 or enroll at an approved course at a 14CFR141 approved flight school. The applicant must accumulate and log specific aeronautical experience, and pass a three-part examination: a knowledge test (a computerized multiple-choice test, typically called the "written test"), an oral test, and a practical test carried out by either an FAA inspector or a Designated Pilot Examiner.

Another form of authorization is a logbook endorsement from a flight instructor that establishes that the certificate holder has received training in specific skill areas that do not warrant a full test, such as the ability to fly a tailwheel-equipped, high-performance, complex, or pressurized airplane.

Pilot certificates do not expire, although they may be suspended or revoked by the FAA. However, a pilot must maintain currency — recent flight experience that is relevant to the flight being undertaken. To remain current, every pilot has to undergo a flight review with an instructor every 24 calendar months unless she or he gains a new pilot certificate or rating in that time or satisfies the flight review requirement using an alternate approved means. For most types of certificate, she or he must also undergo a medical examination at intervals ranging from six months to five years, depending on the pilot's age and desired flight privileges. Other currency requirements apply to the carriage of passengers or to flight under instrument flight rules (IFR).

A medical certificate is not necessary to fly a glider, balloon, or light-sport Aircraft. An ultralight aircraft may be piloted without a pilot certificate or a medical certificate.

In addition to pilot certificates, the FAA issues separate airman certificates for flight engineers, flight instructors, ground instructors, aircraft dispatchers, mechanics/repairmen, parachute riggers, control tower operators, flight navigators, and flight attendants as of November 2021.

== Pilot training ==
Most pilots in the U.S. undergo flight training as private individuals with a flight instructor, who may be employed by a flight school. Those who have decided on aviation as a career often begin with an undergraduate aviation-based education. Some pilots are trained in the military and are issued with civilian certificates based on their military record. Others are trained directly by airlines. The pilot may choose to be trained under Part 61 or Part 141 of the FARs. Part 141 requires that a certificated flight school provide an approved, structured course of training, which includes a specified number of hours of ground training (for example, 35 hours for Private Pilot in an airplane). Part 61 sets out a list of knowledge and experience requirements, and is more suitable for students who cannot commit to a structured plan, or for training from freelance instructors.

=== Knowledge tests ===
Most pilot certificates and ratings require the applicant to pass a knowledge test, also called the written test. The knowledge test results are valid for a period of 2 years, and are usually a prerequisite for practical tests. Resources available to prepare for the knowledge test may be obtained from pilot supply stores or vendors. The exceptions where a knowledge exam is not required for a practical test are for some add-on ratings after the initial license, such as a powered aircraft pilot adding another category rating at the same license level.

To take knowledge tests for all pilot certificates and ratings, the applicant must have a sign-off from a ground or flight instructor. These are usually given by an instructor who has taught a ground school course, provided ground instruction or reviewed the applicant's self-study preparations. Certain circumstances don't require sign-offs for some flight instructor or airline transport pilot knowledge tests.

=== Practical tests ===
All pilot certificates and ratings, except sUAS, require a practical test, usually called a check ride. For each practical test, the FAA publishes an Airman Certification Standards (ACS) document (formerly Practical Test Standards (PTS)) that they expect the applicant to be familiar with, the flight instructor to reference, and the examiner to use to conduct the exam. A practical test is administered by an FAA Inspector or an FAA Designated Pilot Examiner. The check-ride is divided into two parts: the oral exam followed by a flight test in the aircraft. Upon successful completion of the practical test, the examiner issues a temporary airman certificate with the new license or rating. To take practical tests for all pilot certificates and ratings (except airline transport pilot), the applicant must have proper logbook endorsements from their flight instructor, and meet basic eligibility requirements required for the ratings desired.

=== Becoming a professional pilot ===
In aviation, a pilot's level of income and experience are closely related. There are multiple ways to gain the experience required for hire by a scheduled air carrier. Air carriers generally require that the pilots they hire have hours of experience far in excess of the legal minimum. Effective August 1, 2013, all airline pilots must have an Airline Transport Pilot Certificate (ATP) or an Airline Transport Pilot Certificate with restricted Privileges (ATP-r). An ATP allows a pilot to act as the captain or first officer of an airline flight and requires 1,500 hours of total flight time as well as other requirements (i.e. 25 hours of night, 23 years old), see 14CFR61.159. An ATP-r certificate allows a pilot to act as a first officer in a two-pilot crew if they do not meet certain requirements. For example, the total flight time requirement is reduced to as little as 750 hours and the age requirement is reduced to 21. see 14CFR61.160.

Experience is often gained using these methods:

- Military training (because of increased retention efforts by the military services and reduced numbers of active pilots, this is no longer a major source of pilots entering civilian careers)
- Individual training followed by becoming a part- or full-time instructor at an airline-owned flight school, such as United Aviate Academy, or an independent flight school, like ATP Flight School, that has airline pathway programs.
- A college-level aviation program, in which a bachelor's degree (commonly in Aviation Science or a related field) is conferred upon the completion of both flight and classroom coursework. Frequently, upperclassmen are employed as flight instructors for other students.
- Banner towing, traffic reporting, skydiver pilot, fire patrol, pipeline patrol, aerial photography, glider towing, or other "odd jobs" in aviation are fairly low-paying and require only the legal minimum experience. Reaching the regulatory 1,200-hour flight time minimum to act as pilot-in-command under Part 135 on-demand operations is a common means of gaining experience in line operations, weather flying, etc., leading to passenger airline jobs.

== Pilot certificates ==
The FAA offers a progression of pilot certificates or licenses. Each license has varying experience and knowledge requirements and has varying privileges and limitations.

=== Student pilot ===
A student pilot certificate is obtained through the FAA's Integrated Airman Certification and Rating Application (IACRA) system. The student pilot certificate is only required when exercising solo flight privileges. Student pilots must also possess a medical certificate when conducting flights requiring medical certification. As of April 1, 2016, student pilot certificates do not expire. Once a student has accrued sufficient training and experience, a CFI can endorse the student's logbook to authorize limited solo flight in a specific type (make and model) of aircraft. Additional endorsements must be logged for specific airports where a student operates solo.

There is no minimum aeronautical knowledge or experience requirement for the issuance of a student pilot certificate. There are, however, minimum aeronautical knowledge and experience requirements for student pilots to solo, including:

Solo requirements:

- Be at least 16 years of age (14 for glider or balloon)
- Read, speak, write, and understand the English language.
- Demonstrate satisfactory aeronautical knowledge on a knowledge test, including knowledge of the following areas:
  - Airspace rules and procedures for the airport where the solo flight is performed
  - Flight characteristics and operational limitations for the make and model of aircraft to be flown
- Receive and log flight training for the maneuvers and procedures appropriate to the make and model of aircraft to be flown, including:
  - Preflight preparation
  - Taxiing or surface operations, including run-ups
  - Takeoffs and landings, including normal and cross-wind
  - Straight and level flight, and turns in both directions
  - Climbs and climbing turns
  - Airport traffic patterns, including entry and departure procedures
  - Collision avoidance, wind shear avoidance, and wake turbulence avoidance
  - Descents, with and without turns, using high and low drag configurations
  - Flight at various airspeeds from cruise to slow flight
  - Stall entries from various flight attitudes and power combinations with recovery initiated at the first indication of a stall, and recovery from a full stall
  - Emergency procedures and equipment malfunctions
  - Ground reference maneuvers
  - Approaches to a landing area with simulated engine malfunctions
  - Slips to a landing
  - Go-arounds

Limitations while flying solo:

- May not carry passengers.
- May not fly for hire or in furtherance of a business.
- May not fly in other than VMC or above clouds when visual reference cannot be made to the surface.
- May not fly contrary to limitations placed in logbook by instructor.

=== Sport pilot ===
The sport pilot certificate was created in September 2004. The intent of the new rule was to lower the barriers of entry into aviation and make flying more affordable and accessible.

The new rule also created the Light Sport Aircraft (LSA) category of aircraft, which are smaller, lower-powered aircraft. The sport pilot certificate offers limited privileges mainly for recreational use. It is the only powered aircraft certificate that does not require a medical certificate; a valid vehicle driver's license can be used as proof of medical competence provided the prospective pilot was not rejected for their last Airman Medical Certificate.

Before a trainee can start the solo phase of flight training, a Student Sport Pilot Certificate must be issued by the Federal Aviation Administration (FAA). These may be obtained from an FAA Flight Standards District Office or FAA Designated Pilot Examiner.

To qualify for the sport pilot certificate, an applicant must:

- Be at least 17 years of age (16 for glider or balloon)
- Be able to read, speak, write, and understand English
- Log at least 20 hours of flight time, of which at least
  - 15 hours must be dual instruction with a qualified flight instructor
    - 2 hours must be cross-country dual instruction
  - 5 hours must be solo flight
- Fly one solo cross-country flight over a total distance of 75 or more nautical miles to two different destinations to a full-stop landing. At least one leg of this cross-country must be over a total distance of at least 25 nautical miles (46 km).
- Have received 2 hours of dual instruction in the preceding 60 days, in preparation for the Practical Test
- Pass a Knowledge (written) test
- Pass a Practical (oral and flight) test
- Have a valid US State driver's license or a current 3rd class or higher Airman Medical Certificate

The above requirements are for heavier-than-air powered aircraft (airplanes). The requirements for gliders, balloons, gyroplanes, and dirigibles vary slightly.

Sport pilots are only eligible to fly aircraft that are either certificated specifically as light-sport aircraft (LSA) or were certificated prior to the LSA regulations and are within the maximum weight and performance limitations of light-sport aircraft.

The restrictions placed on a Pilot exercising the privileges of a Sport pilot certificate are:

- No more than one passenger
- Daytime flight only (civil twilight is used to define day/night), unless possessing an Airman Medical Certificate, additional instruction and instructor endorsement
- Maximum Takeoff Weight of 1320 lb, compared to 12,500 lb (5,700 kg) of the Private Pilot Certificate or the Recreational Pilot Certificate.
- No flight above 10,000 feet (3,000 m) MSL or 2,000 feet (610 m) AGL, whichever is higher (this automatically excludes flight in Class A airspace)
- No flight in any of the airspace classes that require radio communication (B, C, or D) without first obtaining additional instruction and instructor endorsement

The Sport pilot certificate is also ineligible for additional ratings (such as an Instrument rating), although time in light-sport aircraft can be used towards the experience requirement of other ratings on higher certificate types.

=== Recreational pilot ===
The recreational pilot certificate was created in 1989. It requires less training and offers fewer privileges than the private pilot certificate. It was originally created for flying small single-engine planes for personal enjoyment; the newer Sport Pilot certificate overlaps this need and is easier to get, but the recreational certificate allows access to larger single-engine aircraft, and instructor endorsements are available to recreational pilots that are not applicable to sport pilots, such as flying cross-country.

Eligibility requirements:

- Be at least 17 years old
- Be able to read, speak, write and understand the English language
- Pass a required knowledge test
- Pass a required oral and practical flight test administered by an FAA designated examiner
- Hold either a student or sport pilot certificate.
- Meet the following experience requirements:
  - 30 hours of flight time (15 hours of flight training, 3 hours of solo time, 2 hours of cross-country > 25 NM)

Limitations and restrictions (without additional endorsement):

- May not carry more than one passenger.
- May not fly to an airport further than 50 NM from the departure point.
- May not fly in Class B, C, D airspace or to any controlled airport.
- May not fly an aircraft that has more than four seats, a tailwheel, more than one engine, or more than 180 hp.
- May not fly aircraft falling under the definition of a complex airplane, with retractable gear, adjustable flaps and variable-pitch propeller.
- May not fly between sunset and sunrise.
- May not fly above 10,000 ft MSL or 2,000 ft AGL (whichever is higher)
- If pilot has logged less than 400 hours and has not acted as pilot in command within 180 days, a flight review is required prior to any flight without an instructor.

Most of the above limitations, except the one-passenger, four-seat and single-engine restrictions, can be relaxed or lifted individually through instructor endorsement. These endorsements are obtained by participating in a prescribed course of ground and/or flight instruction given by an FAA-certificated instructor, including a minimum number of instructor-led flight in a plane or situation normally requiring the endorsement. Common types of endorsement for recreational pilots can allow:

- Taking off from and landing at controlled airports and flying within their Class B/C/D airspace.
- Command of "complex airplanes" with mechanisms or flight systems including retractable gear, flaps, and variable-pitch propellers.
- Command of "high-performance" aircraft with engine ratings in excess of 180 hp.
- Command of pressurized aircraft at altitudes exceeding 10,000 MSL (but not above FL180).
- Command of tailwheel aircraft (many such designs are WWII-era fighters which usually also require "complex" and "high-performance" endorsements).
- Command of a specific make and model of aircraft, regardless of its capabilities.
  - The aircraft endorsed must still be single-engine and have four or fewer seats; a recreational pilot may be endorsed for a Mooney Bravo or even a P-51 without having general endorsements for high-performance, complex or tailwheel aircraft, but cannot be endorsed to fly a six-seat Cessna 206 or twin-engine Piper Aztec.
- Flights beyond 50 NM from the departure point, including cross-country VFR flying.
- Night flying by VFR (an instrument rating is still required for night SVFR/IFR, and practically requires a private pilot certification)

A recreational pilot will typically only get a few of these, to allow operation of an aircraft in a few exceptional situations applicable to their locale (the Class B/C/D endorsement, for instance, is practically required for pilots living in major cities). Pilots requiring a large subset of these endorsements are typically better served by obtaining their private pilot certification.

=== Private pilot ===
The private pilot certificate allows command of any aircraft (subject to appropriate ratings) for any non-commercial purpose, and gives almost unlimited authority to fly under visual flight rules (VFR). Passengers may be carried and flight in furtherance of a business is permitted; however, a private pilot may not be compensated in any way for services as a pilot, although passengers can pay a pro rata share of flight expenses, such as fuel or rental costs. A Private Pilot may be reimbursed for the aircraft operating expenses that are directly related to search and location operations, provided the expenses involve only fuel, oil, airport expenditures, or rental fees, and the operation is sanctioned and under the direction and control of a public or private agency that conducts search and location operations. Private pilots may also operate charity flights, subject to certain restrictions, and may participate in similar activities, such as Angel Flight, Civil Air Patrol and many others. Besides the student pilot certificate, the private pilot certificate is the most commonly issued pilot certificate in the United States.

All the requirements to obtain a private pilot certificate for "airplane, single-engine, land", or ASEL, (which is the most common certificate) are:

- Be at least 17 years old (16 years old for glider or balloon rating)
- Be able to read, speak, write and understand the English language
- Obtain at least a third class medical certificate from an Aviation Medical Examiner (except for glider or balloon)
- Pass a computerized aeronautical knowledge test
- Accumulate and log a specified amount of training and experience, including the following:
  - If training under Part 61, Title 14 of the Code of Federal Regulations (CFR) section 61.109, requires at least 40 hours of flight time, including 20 hours of flight with an instructor and 10 hours of solo flight (i.e., by yourself), and other requirements including cross-country flight, which include
    - Solo requirements:
      1. 5 hours of solo cross-country time
      2. One solo cross-country flight of at least 150 nmi (280 km) total distance, with full-stop landings at a minimum of three points and with one segment of the flight consisting of a straight-line distance of at least 50 nmi (93 km) between the takeoff and landing locations
      3. Three solo takeoffs and landings to a full stop at an airport with an operating control tower.
    - Night requirements:
      1. 3 hours of night flight training
      2. 10 takeoffs and 10 landings to a full stop (with each landing involving a flight in the traffic pattern) at an airport
      3. 1 cross-country flight of 100 NM total distance at night
    - 3 hours of flight training on the control and maneuvering solely by reference to instruments
    - 3 hours of flight training for cross-country flights
    - 3 hours of flight training with an authorized instructor in preparation for the practical test, which must have been performed within the preceding 2 calendar months from the month of the test
  - If training under Part 141, at least 35 hours of piloting time including 20 hours with an instructor and 10 hours of solo flight, and other requirements including cross-country and night flights
- Pass an oral test and flight test administered by an FAA inspector, FAA-designated examiner, or authorized check instructor

Holders of a foreign private pilot licence (PPL) may obtain a temporary United States private pilot certificate without any further showing of proficiency, provided they keep the foreign PPL valid. Such a temporary certificate will include the holder's foreign ratings, including an instrument rating if the holder passes the written US instrument rating knowledge test.

=== Commercial pilot ===
A commercial pilot may act as pilot-in-command of an aircraft for compensation or hire, as well as carry persons or property for compensation or hire. Training for the certificate focuses on a better understanding of aircraft systems and a higher standard of airmanship. The commercial pilot certificate itself does not allow a pilot to fly in instrument meteorological conditions. For aircraft categories where an instrument rating is available, commercial pilots without an instrument rating are restricted to daytime flight within 50 nautical miles (93 km) when carrying passengers for hire.

In 2018, the FAA updated the training requirements to no longer require 10 hours of training in a complex airplane. Now, a commercial airplane pilot must log 10 hours of training in either a technically advanced airplane, a complex airplane, or a turbine-powered airplane.

The requirements are:

- Be at least 18 years of age
- Hold a private pilot certificate
- Be able to read, speak, write, and understand the English language
- Accumulate and log a specified amount of training and experience; the following are part of the airplane single-engine land class rating requirements:
  - If training under Part 61, at least 250 hours of piloting time including 20 hours of training with an instructor and 10 hours of solo flight, and other requirements including several "cross-country" flights, i.e., more than 50 nautical miles (93 km)(25 NM for helicopter rate) from the departure airport (which include Day VFR and Night VFR 100 nmi (190 km) between beginning point and destination, with a time of at least two hours; also one cross-country flight of at least 250 nmi (460 km) to the destination, a 300 nmi (560 km) total distance, with landings at three airports) and both solo and instructor-accompanied night flights
  - If training under Part 141, at least 150 hours of training time including 55 hours with an instructor and 10 hours of solo flight, and other requirements including several cross-country, solo, and night flights
- Pass a 100-question aeronautical knowledge written test
- Pass an oral test and flight test administered by an FAA inspector, FAA-designated examiner, or authorized check instructor

By itself, this certificate does not permit the pilot to set up an operation that carries members of the public for hire; such operations are governed by other regulations. Otherwise, a commercial pilot can be paid for certain types of operation, such as banner towing, agricultural applications, and photography, and can be paid for instructing if she or he holds a flight instructor certificate (In the case of lighter-than-air, only a commercial pilot certificate is required to teach for that category). To fly for hire, the pilot must hold a second class medical certificate, which is valid for 12 calendar months if the pilot is 40 years or older; if the pilot is less than 40 years old the certificate is valid for 24 calendar months.

Often, the commercial certificate reduces the pilot's insurance premiums, as it is evidence of training to a higher safety standard.

=== Airline transport pilot ===
An airline transport pilot (commonly called an "ATP") is tested to the highest level of piloting ability. The certificate is a prerequisite for acting as a flight crew-member in scheduled airline operations.

The minimum pilot experience is 1,500 hours of flight time (1200 for Helicopters), 500 hours of cross-country flight time, 100 hours of night flight time, and 75 hours instrument operations time (simulated or actual). Other requirements include being 23 years of age, an instrument rating, being able to read, write, speak, and understand the English language, a rigorous written examination, and being of good moral character.

An Airline Transport Pilot – restricted (ATP-r) is also available for pilots that do not meet the more rigorous requirements of an ATP. The only hour requirement for the ATP-r is 1,500 total and 200 cross-country. The "total time" requirement is reduced to 750 hours for former military pilots, 1,000 hours for graduates of university bachelor's degree programs, or 1,250 for graduates of university associate degree programs. The holder of an ATP-r is limited to serving only as the first officer in a two-pilot operation. Upon obtaining the requisite age and aeronautical experience, the pilot is issued an unrestricted ATP without further examination. see 14CFR61.160 (requirements) and 14CFR61.167 (privileges and limitations)

=== Remote pilot ===
UAVs weighing between 0.55 lb and 55 lb or used in a commercial nature is subject to Part 107 regulations. Exemptions for Part 107 are granted on a case-by-case basis by the FAA subject to risk mitigation. UAV weighing 55 lb or more are subject to Part 333 regulations.

Eligibility requirements:
(Non Part 61 certificate holders)

- Be at least 16 years old
- Be able to read, speak, write and understand the English language
- Pass a required knowledge test
- Must be easily accessible by the remote pilot during all UAS operations
- Valid for 2 years – certificate holders must pass recurrent knowledge training every two years

(Part 61 certificate holders)

- Must hold a pilot certificate issued under 14 CFR Part 61
- Must have completed a flight review within the previous 24 months
- Valid for 2 years – certificate holders must pass either a recurrent online training course OR recurrent knowledge test every two years

Restrictions

- Unmanned aircraft must weigh less than 55 lb. (25 kg).
- Visual line-of-sight (VLOS) only; the unmanned aircraft must remain within VLOS of the remote pilot in command and the person manipulating the flight controls of the small UAS. Alternatively, the unmanned aircraft must remain within VLOS of the visual observer.
- At all times the small unmanned aircraft must remain close enough to the remote pilot in command and the person manipulating the flight controls of the small UAS for those people to be capable of seeing the aircraft with vision unaided by any device other than corrective lenses.
- Small unmanned aircraft may not operate over any persons not directly participating in the operation, not under a covered structure, and not inside a covered stationary vehicle.
- For pilots who passed the knowledge test prior to April 2021 and have not taken the night operations training unit are limited to daylight-only operations, or civil twilight (30 minutes before official sunrise to 30 minutes after official sunset, local time) with appropriate anti-collision lighting.
- Must yield right of way to other aircraft.
- May use visual observer (VO) but not required.
- First-person view camera cannot satisfy “see-and-avoid” requirement but can be used as long as requirement is satisfied in other ways.
- Maximum groundspeed of 100 mph (87 knots).
- Maximum altitude of 400 feet above ground level (AGL) or, if higher than 400 feet AGL, remain within 400 feet of a structure.
- Minimum weather visibility of 3 miles from control station (500 feet of visibility below clouds, and 2000 feet horizontally away from clouds).
- Operations in Class B, C, D and E airspace are allowed with the required ATC permission.
- Operations in Class G airspace are allowed without ATC permission.
- No person may act as a remote pilot in command or VO for more than one unmanned aircraft operation at one time.
- No operations from a moving aircraft.
- No operations from a moving vehicle unless the operation is over a sparsely populated area.
- No careless or reckless operations.
- No carriage of hazardous materials.
- Flying UAS in and around stadiums is prohibited starting one hour before and ending one hour after the scheduled time of any of the following events (Specifically, UAS operations are prohibited within a radius of three nautical miles of the stadium or venue.):
  - Major League Baseball
  - National Football

It is possible to mix the license levels on one certificate. For example, a private pilot with both glider and airplane ratings could earn a commercial license for gliders. The new license would then list the airplane ratings as having only "private privileges."

== Hour requirements ==
Pilots are required to accumulate a certain number and type of flight hours for each certificate or rating. The requirements become more numerous with each successive rating, but most requirements can be "stacked" (i.e., flying cross-country in instrument conditions fulfills both cross-country and instrument hour requirements). Detailed requirements for each rating can be found in 14 CFR Part 61 and in the sections to follow.

While it is theoretically possible to achieve a certificate/rating at the minimum hour requirements, pilots are required to demonstrate proficiency before they can take the written, oral, and practical tests for each. The Private Pilot Certificate in particular is known to take students more than the legal minimum hours to complete. These minimums were set decades ago, before the era of complex GPS units and an increasingly regulated National Airspace System. The national average for the Private Pilot Certificate is currently estimated at 60–75 hours.

=== Instrument Rating ===
According to FAR Part 61.65(d), to be eligible for an Instrument Rating the following aeronautical experience requirements must be met:

- 50 hours of Pilot In Command cross-country flight
- 10 hours of Pilot In Command cross-country flight in an airplane
- 40 hours of actual or simulated instrument flying
- 15 hours of actual or simulated instrument flying in an airplane
- A 250 NM instrument cross-country flight, landing via 3 different types of instrument approach procedure

=== Commercial Pilot Certificate ===
According to FAR Part 61.129(a), to be eligible for a Commercial Pilot Certificate the following aeronautical experience requirements must be met:

- 250 hours of total flight time
- 100 hours of flight time in powered aircraft
- 50 hours of flight time in an airplane
- 100 hours as Pilot In Command
- 50 hours as Pilot In Command in an airplane
- 50 hours of Pilot In Command cross-country flight
- 10 hours of Pilot In Command cross-country flight in an airplane
- 20 hours of flight training with an instructor
- 10 hours of simulated instrument flying with an instructor
- 5 hours of simulated instrument training with an instructor in a single-engine airplane
- 10 hours of complex aircraft training with an instructor
- A 2-hour, 100 NM day cross-country flight with an instructor in a single-engine airplane
- A 2-hour, 100 NM night cross-country flight with an instructor in a single-engine airplane
- 10 hours of solo flight in a single-engine airplane
- a 300 NM cross-country flight in a single-engine airplane with 3 landings, and one landing 250 NM from the departure airport
- 5 hours of night flight in VFR conditions as Pilot In Command
- 10 night takeoffs & landings as Pilot In Command

=== Commercial Pilot Certificate, Multi-engine Rating ===
According to FAR Part 61.129(a), to be eligible for a Commercial Pilot Certificate, Multi-Engine Rating the following aeronautical experience requirements must be met:

=== Air Transport Pilot Certificate ===
According to FAR Part 61.159(a), to be eligible for an Air Transport Pilot Certificate the following aeronautical experience requirements must be met:

== Other certificates and ratings ==
- A flight instructor certificate authorizes the holder to give training and endorsement for a certificate, and perform a flight review. Flight instructors are required to have a concurrent Commercial Pilot certificate in the same category and class of aircraft. Although Flight Instructors are generally compensated, flight instruction is not considered commercial flight operation for purposes of medical certification or operational limitations. If flight instructors are also acting as Pilot in Command they are required to have a medical certificate appropriate for the particular flight. Flight instructor certificates automatically expire after 24 calendar months unless they are renewed by completing a flight instructor refresher course before they have expired.
- A Ground Instructor Certificate authorizes the holder to give ground instruction, give knowledge exam endorsements, and provide the ground training portion of a flight review.
- An instrument rating is required to fly under instrument flight rules. Instrument ratings are issued for a specific category of aircraft; a pilot certificated to fly an airplane under IFR has an Instrument Airplane rating.
- An instrument instructor rating authorizes a certificated flight instructor to give training and endorsement for an instrument rating pilot.
- A multi-engine rating is required to fly an airplane with more than one engine. It is the most common example of a class rating.
- A multi-engine instructor rating authorizes a certificated flight instructor to give training and endorsement for a multi-engine rating.

United States military pilots are issued an Aviator Badge upon completion of flight training and issuance of a pilot's certificate. Badges for crew or ground positions are also issued to qualified applicants.

Unmanned Aircraft System (Drone) pilots are required to obtain a remote pilot airman certificate with a small UAS rating when operating commercially.

== Number of active pilots ==
An active pilot is defined as one who holds both a pilot certificate and a valid medical certificate, for certifications that require a medical certificate. As of the end of 2020, in the US, there were an estimated 691,691 active certificated pilots. This number has been declining gradually over the past several decades, down from a high of 827,071 pilots in 1980. There were 702,659 in 1990, 625,581 in 2000, and 627,588 in 2010. The numbers include:

U.S. Civil Airmen Statistics

Category		Year 2020	Year 2010	Year 2000	Year 1990	Year 1980	Year 1970	Year 1960
Student pilots		222,629	119,119	93,064	128,663	199,833	195,861	99,182
Recreational (only) pilots		105	212	340	87	—N/a	—N/a	—N/a
Sport (only) pilots		6,643	3,682	—N/a	—N/a	—N/a	—N/a	—N/a
Airplane	Private pilots	160,860	202,020	251,561	299,111	357,479	303,779	138,869
Airplane	Commercial pilots	103,879	123,705	121,858	149,666	183,442	186,821	89,904
Airplane	Airline transport pilots	164,193	142,198	141,596	107,732	69,569	34,430	18,279
Rotorcraft (only) pilots		13,629	15,377	9,387	7,833	6,030	6,677	616
Glider (only) pilots		19,753	21,275	7,775	9,567	7,039	3,114	802
Lighter-than-air pilots		—N/a	—N/a	—N/a	—N/a	3,679	2,047	410
Total		691,691	627,588	625,581	702,659	827,071	732,729	348,062
Total except student pilots		469,062	508,469	532,517	573,996	627,238	536,868	248,880

These numbers are based on the highest certifications held by individual pilots.

Rating	Year 2020	Year 2010	Year 2000	Year 1990	Year 1980	Year 1970	Year 1960
Pilots with flight instructor rating	117,558	96,473	80,931	63,775	60,440	37,882	31,459
Pilots with instrument rating	316,651	318,001	311,944	297,073	260,461	169,848	63,264
Total except student, sport, and recreational pilots	462,314	504,575	532,177	573,909	627,238	536,868	248,880

- A person holds at least a commercial pilot certificate may apply for flight instructor rating. (with some exceptions for flight instructors with sport pilot rating)
- A person holds at least a private pilot certificate may apply for instrument rating.

In addition, there are 206,322 remote pilots. Remote pilots are those licensed to operate unmanned aircraft systems (drones) . The certification began to be offered in 2016, and does not need an active medical certificate to be considered active, but must take a re-training every 2 years

Category		Year 2020	Year 2010	Year 2000	Year 1990	Year 1980	Year 1970	Year 1960
All pilot categories	Total	691,691	627,588	625,581	702,659	827,071	732,729	348,062
All pilot categories	Women	58,541	42,218	36,757	40,515	52,902	29,472	9,966
All pilot categories except student pilots	Total	469,062	508,469	532,517	573,996	627,238	536,868	248,880
All pilot categories except student pilots	Women	26,854	27,451	25,948	25,508	26,896	13,685	4,218

== Medical certification and requirements ==
All certificated pilots, with the exception of those with a sport or Recreational pilot certificate (or when in command of balloons or gliders, including power assisted gliders, or pilots with "higher" certificates that choose to operate under the sport pilot rules), are required to maintain a medical certification commensurate with the privileges they intend to exercise as pilot-in-command of an aircraft.

For sport pilot certificate applicants or holders, regulations state that a medical is required if the applicant/pilot does not hold a valid United States driver's license.

To obtain a medical certification, pilots are required to undergo a medical examination from an Aviation Medical Examiner, or AME. The Aviation Medical Examiner performs an examination based upon the class of certification desired.

There are four options for medical qualification:

=== Third class ===
Third class certifications require the least involved examinations of all medical certifications. They are required for those intending to be pilot-in-command of an aircraft under the Private or Recreational pilot certificates or while exercising solo privileges as a student pilot. To qualify for a third class medical certificate, pilots must meet the following requirements:

- Distant vision: 20/40 or better in each eye separately, with or without correction
- Near vision: 20/40 or better in each eye separately, with or without correction, as measured at a distance of 16 inches (410 mm)
- Color vision: Demonstrate the ability to perceive the colors necessary for the safe performance of airman duties
- Hearing: Demonstrate the ability to hear an average conversational voice in a quiet room, using both ears, at a distance of six feet, with their back turned to the examiner, or pass an approved audiometric test
- Ear, Nose, and Throat: Exhibit no ear disease or condition manifested by, or that may reasonably be expected to be manifested by, vertigo or a disturbance of speech or equilibrium
- Blood Pressure: Under 155/95
- Mental Status: No diagnosis of psychosis, bipolar disorder, or severe personality disorders
- Substance Dependence: No dependence on alcohol or any pharmacological substance in the previous two years

For pilots under 40 years of age, third class medical certificates expire on the last day of the month they were issued, five years from the date of issue. The FAA changed this rule from three to five years on July 24, 2008. For all others, they expire on the last day of the month they were issued, two years from the date of issue.

In December 2015, the U.S. Senate passed a bill sponsored by Montana Senator Steve Daines, S. 571- Pilot's Bill of Rights 2 (PBOR 2). If signed into law, the bill would expand the third class medical exemption for recreational pilots by reforming the FAA's medical certification process to include more qualified, trained pilots.

=== BasicMed ===
A pilot who has held a valid Third class or higher medical certificate since 2006 may fly certain aircraft under certain conditions under FAR Part 68, commonly known as BasicMed, by having a physician fill out an examination form every 4 years stating that the physician knows of no reason why the pilot shouldn't fly and taking an online test every 24 months.

- Under 12,500 lb Max Take Off Weight
- 7 seats or fewer
- Under 250 kn
- Under 18,000 ft.

BasicMed FAQs

=== Second class ===
A second class medical is required for those intending to exercise the privileges of the commercial pilot certificate. It is possible to obtain a commercial pilot certificate while holding a third class medical, but with the exception of flight instruction, the licensee cannot exercise privileges beyond those of a private pilot.

To qualify for a second class medical certificate, pilots must meet the requirements for the third class certificate plus:

- Distant vision: 20/20 or better in each eye separately, with or without correction
- Intermediate vision: 20/40 or better in each eye separately, with or without correction, at age 50 and over, as measured at 32 inches

Second class certificates are valid until the last day of the month, twelve months after they were issued. The certificate holder may then only exercise the privileges of a third class medical certificate.

=== First class ===
First class certificates are required for those intending to be pilot-in-command in an air carrier operation requiring an Airline Transport Pilot (ATP) certificate. Other operations, including those under Part 91, may require a first class medical for insurance purposes, although it is not a federal requirement in such cases.

To qualify for the first class medical certificate, pilots must meet the requirements for the third and second class certificates plus:

- Heart Function: Electrocardiogram must show normal heart function once at age 35 and annually for those age 40 and over
- Maximum of 65

For pilots under 40 years of age, first class medical certificates expire on the last day of the month they were issued, one year from the date of issue. The FAA introduced this rule on July 24, 2008. For all others, they are valid until the last day of the month, six months after they were issued. The certificate holder may then only exercise the privileges of a second class medical certificate until the last day of the month, twelve months after the certificate was issued, thereafter the privileges of a third class medical until the last day of the month, twenty-four months after the medical was issued (FAA $61.23 (d-1-iii)).

=== Special issuance ===
Pilots who do not meet the above requirements may be issued a medical certificate under a "special issuance." A special issuance is essentially a waiver for a disqualifying condition and are evaluated case-by-case depending on the class of certificate requested. Minor problems can be overcome by a special issuance from an Aviation Medical Examiner, while others require a special issuance from the FAA directly.

=== Restrictions ===
Restrictions may be placed upon a medical certificate to mitigate any concern for safety. A common restriction for pilots who require glasses or contacts to meet the required visual acuity standards is that they "MUST WEAR CORRECTIVE LENSES." Color-blind pilots are typically issued a restriction reading, "NOT VALID FOR NIGHT FLIGHT OR BY COLOR SIGNAL CONTROL." This mitigates the concern that color-blind pilots may not be able to identify those colors required for the performance of safe airman duties by preventing situations that are considered potentially unsafe.

For color vision deficient pilots, in many cases these restrictions can be removed through use of an FAA-approved alternative office-based color vision test, which if passed, the applicant must continue to retake that same test (or any other passable tests) at every renewal. If the pilot applicant is unable to pass any of the office-based tests, a real-world operational test is available. This test consists of a ground-based chart reading and control tower signal light test for Third Class medical certification (This is called the Operational Color Vision Test or OCVT), and in addition to that, a specialized "Medical Flight Test" (MFT) is required for Second and First Class medical certification. The applicant performs an actual flight test with an FAA Aviation Safety Inspector (ASI) for the purpose of further demonstrating "the ability to perceive those colors necessary for the safe performance of airman duties", which is the color vision requirement as written in the FARs. Note that "Normal Color Vision" is not required, as a certain amount of color vision deficiency is considered safe and permitted. If the tests are passed, a "Letter of Evidence" (LOE) from the FAA is issued, which serves as evidence that the pilot meets the standards for Color Vision and the AME is permitted to issue the class of Medical Certificate indicated on the LOE (All classes if both the OCVT and MFT are passed) with no related restriction if all other medical requirements are met. This allows the pilot to receive a medical certificate with no restrictions related to color vision without the requirement of passing an office-based color vision test at every subsequent renewal. Alternatively, If an applicant is unable to pass both the OCVT and MFT, the applicant will keep the restriction permanently and will not be allowed any more future attempts to remove it. Therefore, this method of restriction removal is seen as a high-risk, high-reward option for aspiring pilots with color vision deficiency.

== Non-pilot certifications ==
In addition to pilot licenses the FAA also issues other airmen certificates:

- Flight Instructor certification is separate from pilot certification. For every rating on a flight instructor certificate, there must already be a corresponding rating on the individual's commercial pilot certificate. The applicant must also pass written and flight skills tests.
- Flight Engineer Certifications are applicable to large transportation aircraft (more than 80,000 lb). Flight Engineer Certificates are further rated by type of engine they are trained and tested on: turbojet, turboprop, or reciprocating. Flight engineers are becoming less common as modern jets move towards two-person flight crews.
- Flight Navigators certificates are still available, but modern technology and the high speed of jets has made the rating obsolete.
- Aviation Medical Examiner, Ground Instructor, Parachute rigger, Aircraft Maintenance Technician, Repairman and Air Traffic Controller are also federally certificated aviation-related positions. Most of these also have their own rating systems. For example, an A&P is a certificated mechanic with both airframe and powerplant ratings, and a Ground Instructor may be rated to give Basic, Advanced, and/or Instrument training. Aircraft Inspection authorization (IA) is an additional privilege conferred on certificated mechanics who meet specific experience and training requirements.
- Aircraft Dispatcher certificates are required for people involved in operational control/dispatch under 14 CFR Part 121 commercial operations. Qualification requirements can be found in FAR 65.53
- Flight Attendants are required to earn an FAA Certificate of Demonstrated Proficiency by completing a FAA-approved training program (typically conducted by the air carrier). Flight attendants must receive a new certificate when changing air carriers. Certificates are further rated by the airplane group they are trained on: turbojet or propeller-driven.

Pilots do not need FCC licenses to use the radio within the United States (pilot certificates double as FCC radio licenses); however, other countries may require that a pilot have an FCC Restricted Radiotelephone Operator Permit (RR), and the aircraft radio station be licensed.

== See also ==
- Alien Flight Student Program
- Civil Aerospace Medical Institute
- Glider pilot license
- Human Intervention Motivation Study
- Paragliding
- Pilot licensing and certification
- Ultralight aviation
