= Check pilot =

Supervisory aircraft pilot

A check pilot (or check airman) is an aircraft pilot who performs an oversight, safety, and qualification role for commercial pilots undergoing evaluation. The role of the check pilot is to ensure that the flight crew member has met competency standards before the check airman releases the crew member from training and to ensure that those standards are maintained while the crew member remains in line service.

A check pilot is authorized to conduct the following:

- Pilot proficiency or competency checks conducted as a qualification curriculum segment in the operator's approved training program, from either pilot seat in an aircraft, whether in flight, or in a simulator, as appropriate.
- Flight instruction in the operator's approved training program, from either pilot seat in an aircraft in flight, or in a simulator, or both, as appropriate.
- Supervision of the reestablishment of landing ability.
- Special checks conducted as a qualification curriculum segment of the operator's approved training program, provided the check airman is qualified in the specific activity for which the special check is being conducted (such as Category II (CAT II) and Category III (CAT III) operations).
- Certification of the satisfactory proficiency and knowledge of airmen after completion of a flight training curriculum segment or flight training module.
- When authorized by the operator, ground instruction for airmen, and certification of the satisfactory completion by an airman of a ground training curriculum segment.

== See also ==
- Checkride
