= Pilot licensing in Australia =

In Australia, pilot licences are issued by the Civil Aviation Safety Authority. Licences are issued for different categories of aircraft, including aeroplanes and helicopters.

== Recreational pilot licence ==
The recreational pilot licence (RPL) is unique to Australia, and is not a standard ICAO licence. It replaced the General Flight Progress Test (GFPT).

The minimum age for an RPL is 16. It requires 25 hours experience, a written exam and a basic flight test.

The RPL is equivalent to the RA-Aus pilot certificate, which is issued by Recreational Aviation Australia. It can be converted to a CASA-issued RPL.

== Private pilot licence ==
=== Requirements ===
In order to gain a Private Pilot Licence (PPL) in Australia, the minimum requirements are:

- Obtain a mark of 70% or more in the CASA aeroplane or helicopter exam, which tests all seven subjects listed in the Day VFR Syllabus.
- Hold at least a Class 2 medical certificate
- Have a minimum of 40 hours total flight time, of which 10 must be pilot in command, of which 5 must be solo cross-country. 2 hours instrument flying is also required.

For an integrated course, only 35 hours flight experience is required. Most students, however, require approximately 55-60 hours of flight time to achieve the standard required for a PPL.

=== Privileges ===
The PPL allows private pilots to operate single engine aircraft in VFR conditions throughout all Australian airspace classes in daylight. For students upgrading from a Recreational Pilot Licence (RPL), it removes the 1500 kg Maximum Takeoff Weight limitation, allowing pilots to fly any Australian registered aircraft as pilot in command, providing they hold appropriate endorsements for that specific type.

PPL holders may go on to gain a night VFR rating, Private Instrument Rating (PIFR) to fly under the Instrument Flight Rules (IFR), including at night and in adverse weather, Multi Engine Aeroplane (MEA) Class Ratings, and other operational privileges and endorsements such as aerobatics and aircraft design features.

PPL holders may operate Australian registered aircraft in foreign airspace, subject to the regulations of the relevant government aviation authorities.

Under a PPL, Australian pilots are limited to 5 passengers onboard their aircraft, regardless of aircraft seating capacity.

== Commercial pilot licence ==
The minimum experience required for a commercial pilot licence (CPL) is 200 hours for a non-integrated course, or 150 hours for an integrated course.

== Air transport pilot licence ==
The minimum experience required for an air transport pilot licence (ATPL) is 1500 hours for aeroplanes, or 1000 hours for helicopters.

== Military pilot licences ==
Members of the Australian Defence Force (ADF) with a military flight crew qualification and sufficient experience can convert it into an Air Transport Pilot Licence by completing a flight test.

== Conversion ==
Holders of a foreign (ICAO) pilot licence may fly temporarily in Australia for up to 12 months using a Certificate of Validation.

To gain a permanent Australian licence on the basis of an ICAO licence, the applicant must demonstrate English language proficiency. For licences more advanced than the PPL, the applicant must pass a conversion exam and sometimes a flight test.

Australia and New Zealand recognise each other's licences.
