= FAA Certificate =

The term FAA Certificate may refer to an FAA-issued certificate:

- Pilot certificate, one of several kinds of airman certificates issued by the FAA;
- Ground Instructor certificate;
- Type certificate of the airworthiness of a particular category of aircraft;
- Approval certificate of a maintenance company.
