= Meryl Getline =

American pilot, author, and columnist (1953–2019)

Meryl Jan Getline (June 26, 1953 – June 19, 2019) was an American pilot, author, and columnist.

== Biography ==
Born in Dayton, Ohio, Getline grew up in San Diego, California. She first became interested in flying while in college, and persisted despite a bout of airsickness during her first flying lesson. She attempted to join the military and become a pilot there, but circumstances constrained her to work mostly in air traffic control.

Her first position as an airline pilot was with a California-based commuter airline, during which time she earned a type rating on the McDonnell Douglas DC-10. Getline claims that she was the first American woman to do this. She later joined regional airline Wien Air Alaska. In 1985, she was hired by United Airlines, during a pilot's strike action. In 2006, she retired eight years early from the company.

Getline holds a wide variety of airman certificates, including Airline Transport Pilot License (ATP), AMEL, commercial pilot, Airplane Single Engine Land (ASEL), rotorcraft, control tower operator, flight engineer, and ground instructor, as well as type ratings for the Airbus A320, Boeing 727, Boeing 737, Boeing 777, Cessna Citation, and McDonnell Douglas DC-10.

Meryl Getline died on Wednesday, June 19, 2019, from the cancer that finally reached her brain. She was a resident of Elizabeth Colorado, at the time of her death.

== Work ==
Getline has written a number of books based on her experiences as a pilot, and wrote a regular column for USA Today from 2004 to 2006 entitled “Ask the Captain,” in which she answered questions about air travel. She has also written for other publications, including the Christian Science Monitor and Road & Travel Magazine; and as of 2006, she was a regular contributor to Executive Travel magazine.

She has made guest appearances on television news programs, such as ABC's News Now, to discuss her career and the issues facing women in aviation, and also speaks before groups on similar aviation-related subjects.

== Books ==
- The World at My Feet: The True and Sometimes Hilarious Adventures of a Lady Airline Captain (2004)
- Flights of Whimsy: Quips and Quotes (2005)
- Cancer, We Are Not Amused (2019)
