= Private pilot licence =

Type of pilot licence

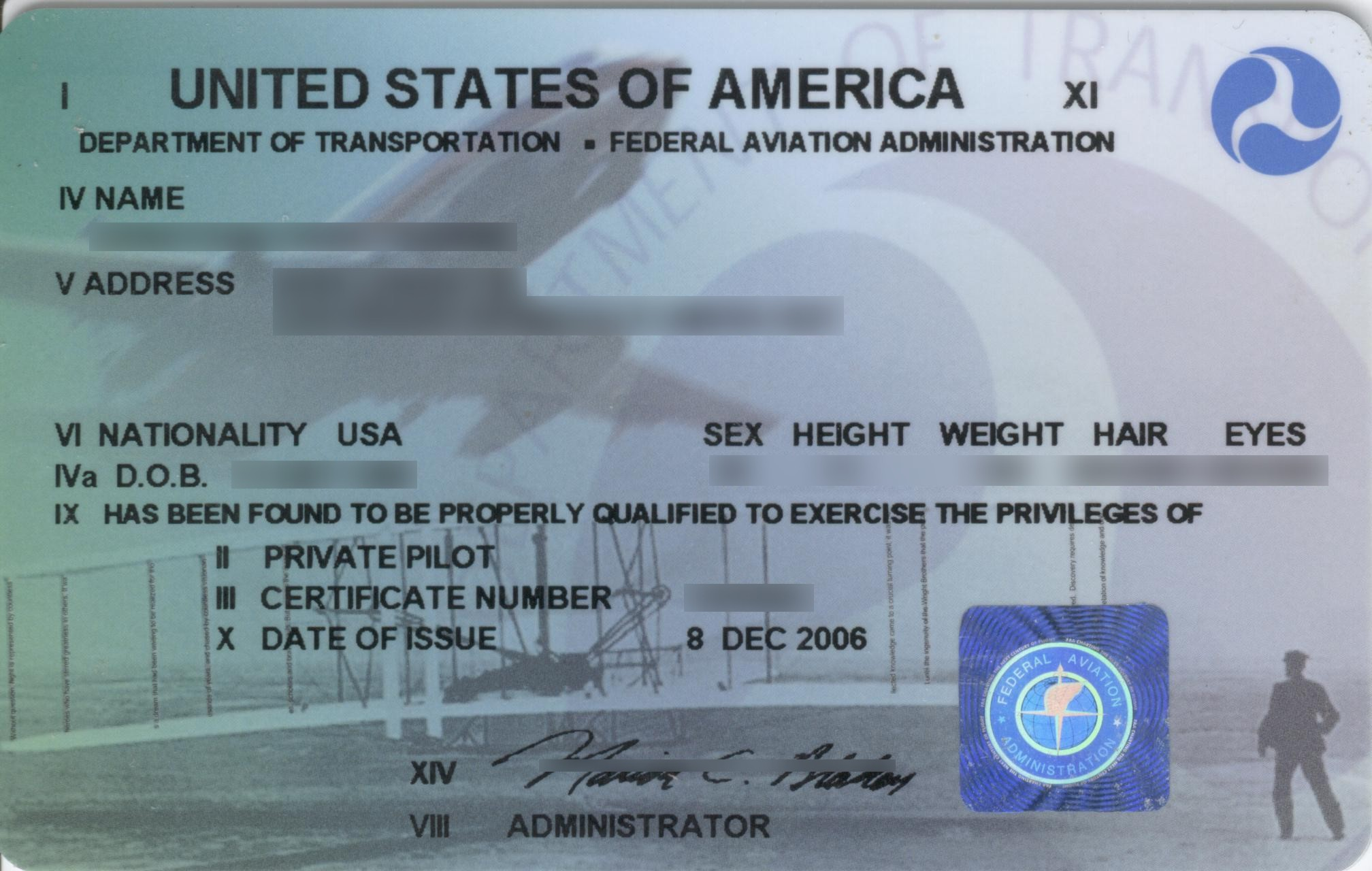
A 2006 plastic private pilot certificate from the United States. Earlier issues were printed on card stock and designs varied.

A private pilot licence (PPL) or private pilot certificate is a type of pilot licence that allows the holder to act as pilot in command of an aircraft privately (not for remuneration). The basic licence requirements are determined by the International Civil Aviation Organization (ICAO), but implementation varies from country to country. According to ICAO, an applicant must be at least 17 years old, demonstrate appropriate knowledge and skill, and hold at least a Class 3 medical certificate. Different PPLs are available for different categories of aircraft, such as aeroplane, helicopter, airship, etc., and are not interchangeable, although experience from a PPL in one category may be credited towards the issue of another.

== Issuing authorities ==
Private pilot licences are issued by the civil aviation authority of each country. Standards vary, and PPLs are not automatically recognised by other countries, but in some countries the holder of a foreign PPL may obtain permission to fly on a temporary basis.

In the United States the FAA (Federal Aviation Administration) has the authority to issue a PPL or another pilot license.

In Europe, civil aviation authorities issue licences based on common EASA standards.

== Categories ==
The aircraft categories described by ICAO for the purposes of the PPL are aeroplane, airship, helicopter and powered lift. Many countries issue PPLs in additional categories such as sailplane (glider), balloon, powered parachute, and weight-shift control.

=== Aeroplanes ===
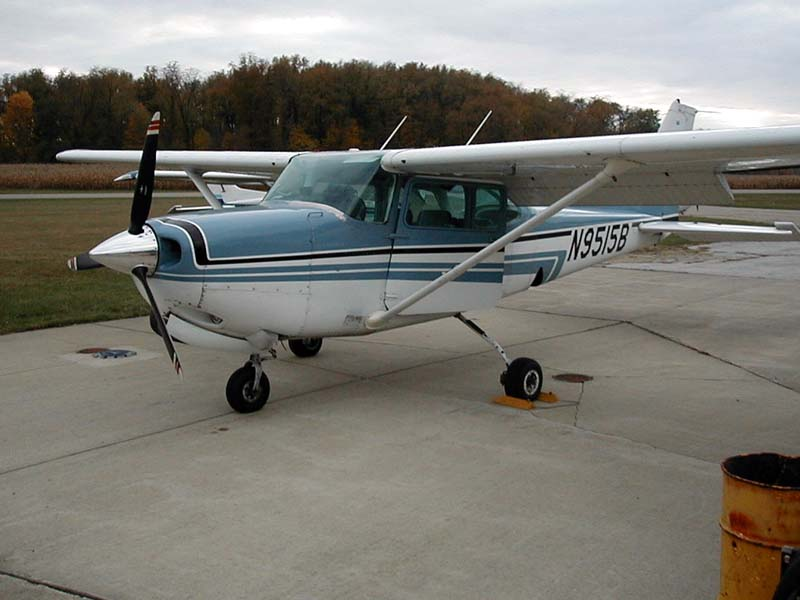
The Cessna 172RG is an example of an aircraft that would require the pilot-in-command to have private pilot licence or greater, with an airplane single-engine land (ASEL) class rating and a complex endorsement in the United States

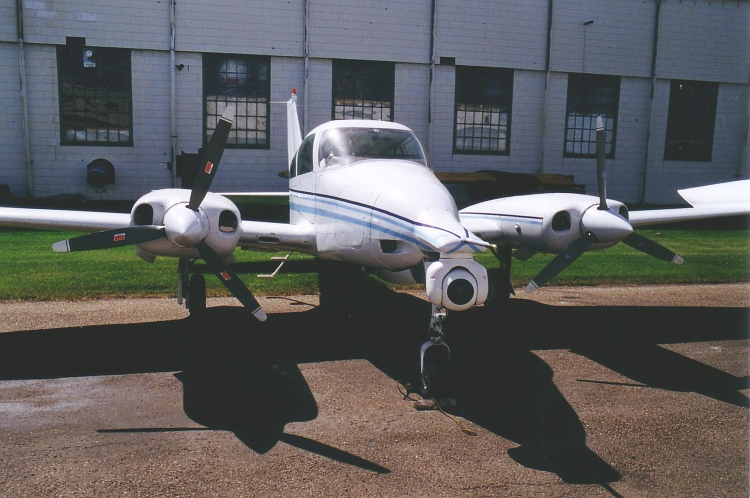
The Cessna 310 is an example of an aircraft that would require a pilot-in-command to have private pilot licence or greater, with an airplane multi-engine land (AMEL) class rating, a complex endorsement and a high-performance endorsement in the United States

The aeroplane PPL is the most popular category of PPL. In the United States in 2022, of 164,000 people with PPLs, 158,000 were for aeroplanes only. In the United Kingdom in 2021, there were 22,500 holders of the PPL(A), and 2,200 holders of the PPL(H).

According to ICAO, the applicant for a PPL(A) must have at least 40 hours experience as a pilot of aeroplanes (35 hours on an integrated course), of that no more than 5 hours in a flight simulator. Credit may be given for flight time in other aircraft categories. The applicant must have at least 10 hours of solo flight time, including at least 5 hours of solo cross-country flight time with at least one cross-country flight of at least 270 km (150 NM) including two full-stop landings at different aerodromes.

In EASA states, the minimum experience for a PPL(A) is 45 hours. In practice, most students take about 50–70 hours to complete the course.

Applicants for the PPL(A) must be at least 17 years old. There is no minimum age to begin flight lessons, however, students must be 16 to fly solo. In the United States, a student pilot certificate is required to fly solo.

In addition to the licence, PPL(A) holders must gain class ratings or type ratings appropriate to the aircraft they wish to fly. Typically a PPL(A) holder would first be issued a "single-engine piston land" class rating, which permits them to fly aircraft with a single piston engine. To fly seaplanes or multi-engine aircraft requires further training, and more complex aircraft require a type-specific rating.

Other ratings include the instrument rating to fly in Instrument Meteorological Conditions, the night rating to fly at night, and various levels of instructor rating.

==== Additional endorsements ====
A number of endorsements are available for specific skills. Endorsements only require instruction and a flight instructor's signature in the pilot's logbook; they do not require any flight test or submission of documents to the national civil aviation authority.

Endorsements available in the United States include:

- Tailwheel (pilots who have logged pilot-in-command time on tailwheel aircraft prior to 15 April 1991 are exempt from this requirement) – Tailwheel endorsement not applicable in Canada
- Complex airplane (aircraft with a variable-pitch propeller, flaps, and retractable landing gear)
- High-performance (more than 200 horsepower per engine)
- Pressurized aircraft endorsement for aircraft that have a service ceiling or maximum operating altitude, whichever is lower, above 25,000 feet MSL (mean sea level).
- Night vision goggle operations

Other aircraft operations for which the FAA does not require an endorsement that typically require additional training are glider towing and aerobatics. The FAA also does not require an endorsement for some commercial activities like banner towing. Aerial application (crop seeding, spraying and dusting), whether conducted by a commercial certificate holder operating for hire or by a private pilot treating a crop in which he is the owner of a substantial share, requires an Authorization under Part 137 of the Federal Aviation Regulations.

=== Helicopters ===
According to ICAO, the requirements for a PPL(H) are similar to the PPL(A). The qualifying cross-country flight must be at least 180 km (100 NM), and the applicant must have received at least 20 hours instruction in helicopters.

In the United States, the legal aircraft category is known as rotorcraft, which is subdivided into helicopters and gyroplanes.

=== Airships ===
According to ICAO, applicants for a PPL(As) must have at least 25 hours flight time as pilot of airships, including "3 hours of cross-country flight training in an airship with a cross-country flight totalling not less than 45 km (25 NM); 5 take-offs and 5 landings to a full stop at an aerodrome with each landing involving a flight in the traffic pattern at an aerodrome; 3 hours of instrument time; and 5 hours as pilot assuming the duties of the pilot-in-command under the supervision of the pilot-in-command."

=== Balloons ===
In the United Kingdom, the balloon equivalent of the private pilot licence is known as the Balloon Pilot Licence (BPL). Classes are:

- Hot-air balloon class (divided into four groups)
- Gas balloon class
- Mixed balloon class
- Hot-air airship class

In the United States, the minimum age for a balloon private pilot certificate is 16.

In the United States, some limitations may be placed on the certificate, such as "limited to hot air balloons with airborne heater" or "limited to gas balloons", unless the pilot has had appropriate flight training in the other type of balloon and received a logbook endorsement.

=== Sailplanes ===
For gliders (sailplanes), the licence is known as a Sailplane Pilot Licence (SPL), and has lower requirements than an aeroplane PPL.

In the United States and Europe, the minimum age for a sailplane private pilot certificate is 16.

== See also ==
- Commercial pilot license
- EASA pilot licensing
- Pilot certification in the United States
- Pilot licensing and certification
- Pilot licensing in Australia
- Pilot licensing in Canada
- Pilot licensing in the United Kingdom
- Private aviation
