= Complex airplane =

Aircraft term

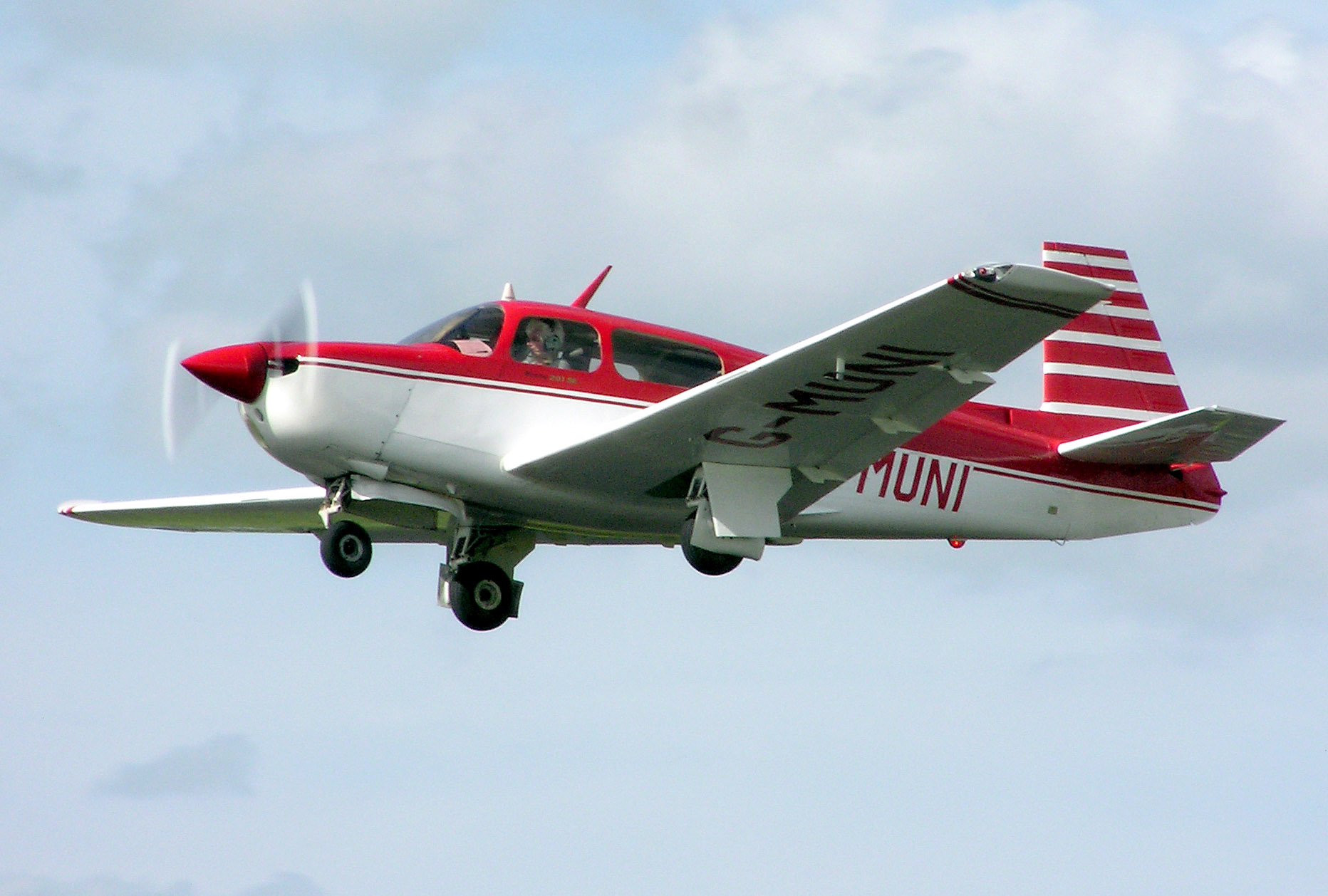
A Mooney M20J, an example of a complex airplane.

A complex airplane is defined by the United States Federal Aviation Administration as an aircraft that has all of the following:

- Retractable landing gear (land aircraft only; a seaplane is not required to have this).
- A controllable-pitch propeller (which includes airplanes with constant-speed propellers and airplanes with FADEC which controls both the engine and propeller; turbojet and turbofan airplanes, except very rare mixed-propulsion airplanes, are not considered complex).
- Movable or adjustable flaps.

The current FAA definitions of "complex airplane" are found in the Airplane Flying Handbook FAA-H-8083-3C Chapter 12 and in FAA Order 8900.2C.

In the US, students generally train for their first pilot certificate in an aircraft with fixed landing gear and a fixed-pitch propeller. It may or may not be equipped with flaps.

Before or after earning the private pilot certificate (PPL) (usually after), a pilot can be trained in complex aircraft operation by a flight instructor. When the pilot has demonstrated proficiency in complex aircraft, the flight instructor endorses the pilot's logbook and the pilot is said to have a "complex endorsement".

As of April 24, 2018 the FAA requires a commercial pilot applicant and CFI applicant to have experience in a complex aircraft; however, the practical test may be taken in a non-complex aircraft for the commercial pilot certificate (CPL) and the flight instructor certificate (CFI).
