= ATP Flight School =

Flight training school in the United States

- Type: Private
- Industry: Flight Training
- Founded: 1984; 42 years ago in Atlanta, Georgia, United States
- Headquarters: Jacksonville, FL, United States
- Number of locations: 87 training centers
- Website: https://atpflightschool.com

ATP Flight School is a flight training company based in Jacksonville, Florida with locations across the United States. It offers programs for individuals pursuing careers as commercial pilots, with a focus on airline-oriented training. As the largest flight training provider in the country, ATP Flight School is a major supplier of professionally trained pilots to regional airlines in the United States.

== History ==
ATP Flight School was started by a group of airline pilots in 1984 and is headquartered outside of Jacksonville, Florida. ATP stands for Airline Transport Professionals. The pilots established the school to provide training to U.S. military pilots who were transitioning to commercial air carrier operations. The school's curriculum later expanded to include ab-initio (from the beginning) training, as well as other courses for private, multiengine, instrument, commercial, and CFI ratings.

In 2014, the school purchased a majority share of Higher Power Aviation (HPA), a flight simulator training center based in Dallas and rebranded it as ATP JETS. HPA offered initial type rating and recurrent training to airline, corporate, military, government, and individual aircrew for all models of the Boeing B-727, B-737, B-757, B-767, C-9, MD-80, and Airbus A320. Together, ATP and HPA developed the Airline Transport Pilot Certificate Training Program (ATP CTP).

In May 2021, ATP reported that, every month, its then-61 locations provided more than 24,500 hours of flight training, and graduated over 117 commercial multi-engine pilots with CFIs. The company also issued more than 8,600 FAA certificates annually. In the preceding 18 months, 438 ATP graduates were hired by airlines.

In 2022, ATP was the largest civilian aviation training facility in the United States. At the time, it had trained 20,000 pilots.

== Schools ==
ATP Flight School has 81 locations throughout the United States Facilities can be found in Phoenix, Dallas, Atlanta, Jacksonville, Chicago, Denver, Seattle, San Diego, Las Vegas, and other cities.

In Dallas, TX, ATP operates a part 142 airline training center called ATP JETS, that provides Airline Transport Pilot Certification Training Program (ATP CTP) training for ten airlines. It offers full-motion Airbus and Boeing simulators. In November, 2021 ATP JETS graduated its 10,000th ATP CTP student and in November 2023 the 20,000th student graduated the program.

In 2019, the company opened a training center at the Tucson International Airport. It marks ATP's third location in Arizona, with the other two centers located in Mesa and Scottsdale. ATP's Arizona instructors were recognized as the best in the region by the Aircraft Owners and Pilots Association (AOPA).

In October 2021, ATP Flight School opened a new training center at Arlington Municipal Airport (KGKY), just outside of Dallas, Texas. It is the largest training facility in Texas and helps support the demand for pilots from Dallas-based airlines like Southwest and American Airlines. The facility includes classroom and briefing spaces; an advanced simulator bay with multiple flight training devices (FTDs); an FAA-certified Level 6 Cessna 172 FTD; and a new maintenance facility.

Other ATP schools in the Dallas area can be found at McKinney National Airport (KTKI) and Addison Airport (KADS).

In February 2022, ATP opened its 70th flight training center at Allegheny County Airport (AGC) in Pennsylvania. A few months later, in April, a training center was opened at Page Field (FMY) in Fort Myers, Florida. The location offers a simulator bay with Frasca TruFlite simulators with immersive 220-degree wrap-around visuals, as well as a dedicated maintenance hangar for the location's multi-engine Piper Seminoles and all-glass cockpit Piper Archers.

In July 2023, ATP Flight School added a new airline pilot training center at Brackett Field (KPOC) in La Verne, California. This was ATP's third training center in the Los Angeles area. Long Beach and Riverside locations were previously established.

In January 2025, ATP Flight School reopened its airline pilot training center at Sarasota Bradenton International Airport (SRQ) after it was closed due to damage sustained during Hurricane Ian in 2022. The facility reopened in February 2025.

== Training ==
ATP Flight School focuses on airline-oriented flight training, operating under a fixed-cost, fixed-timeframe training model. Its primary program is an ab-initio airline pilot training course, which takes students from no prior experience to commercial multi-engine pilot, including certificated flight instructor certifications. Graduates of this program may be offered roles as certified flight instructors (CFIs), to gain experience and accumulate flight hours to meet airline hiring requirement.

As of March 2022, ATP conducted over 1% of all general aviation flight operations in the United States, with a monthly flight time of more than 38,700 hours resulting in students earning 8,344 certificates annually.

=== Airline Career Pilot Program ===
The Airline Career Pilot Program is a fixed-cost flight training program designed for students with no prior experience. The program takes approximately twelve months to complete, during which students earn Commercial Pilot and Flight Instructor certificates. The training consists of full-time flight and simulator lessons, ground school and independent study. Throughout the program, students receive support and mentorship from local training specialists who assist in managing their progress. After completing the program, graduates may be hired as flight instructors at ATP for around 18 months to gain experience and meet airline hiring requirements. During this period, they may also be eligible for airline-sponsored tuition reimbursement and direct airline programs. In 2022, ATP stated its goal to graduate 20,000 airline pilots by 2030.

=== Airline Transport Pilot Certification Training Program ===
In August 2015, the FAA approved the company's airline transport pilot certification training program (ATP CTP), which is offered at ATP's ATP JETS training center in Dallas. By November 2023, more than 20,000 students had graduated from the program.

=== Indiana Wesleyan University partnership ===
In December 2022, Indiana Wesleyan University-National & Global partnered with ATP to create degree pathways for pilots who complete their FAA certificates through ATP. ATP alumni who enroll at the university can count their flight training experience as degree credit and receive a tuition discount on certain programs.

== Fleet ==
ATP Flight School operates the largest multi-engine training fleet in the world, which consists primarily of Piper Seminoles, along with one Cessna 525 CitationJet. The school's single-engine fleet includes a mix of Piper Archers and Cessna 172 Skyhawks.

=== Fleet Growth ===
ATP Flight School initially used Cessna Skyhawks as its primary training aircraft before adding Piper Archers to its fleet. By 2009, the company operated 142 aircraft, including 86 Piper Seminoles, 50 Cessna 172s, five Diamond Stars, and one CitationJet. In 2011, ATP and Piper Aircraft Inc. announced the sale of 30 new Piper Seminoles, valued at $18 million, with the aircraft equipped with Garmin's G500 glass cockpit avionics suite, bringing the total number of aircraft with this technology to 270.

In April, 2013, ATP reached an agreement with Piper Aircraft to purchase up to 100 Piper Archers, with deliveries beginning later that year. These aircraft were standardized with the Garmin G500 avionics suite. By September 2017, ATP's fleet included approximately 100 Cessna Skyhawks and 55 Piper Archers. In 2018, ATP announced a second order for 100 additional Piper Archers, with the 100th Archer delivered on September 19, 2018. ATP renewed this order in 2020 for another 100 planes.

In 2019, ATP placed an order for 100 Cessna Skyhawks, scheduled for delivery through 2023. In October 2022, ATP reached an agreement with Textron Aviation for the purchase of 55 additional Skyhawks, with deliveries set to begin in late 2023 and continue through 2024. ATP ordered another 40 Skyhawks in January 2024, with deliveries starting in 2026. This marked the fourth fleet purchase by ATP in just over a year, totaling 135 Skyhawks.

As of November 2022, ATP Flight School maintained a fleet of 550 aircraft across more than 75 locations, consisting of the following:

Aircraft	Cruising Speed	Range	Number in ATP Fleet	References
Piper Archer TXs	128 ktas / 237 km/h	522 nm / 967 km	230	
Piper PA-44 Seminole	162 ktas / 300 km/h (at 75% power)	700 nm / 1,426 km	100	
Cessna 172	124 ktas / 230 km/h	640 nm / 1185 km	227	

=== Training devices and simulators ===
ATP Flight School operates 134 Flight Training Devices (FTDs), including the Frasca Piper Seminole Truflite FTDs with GNS 430, AATD, Redbird, CRJ-200, and Full Flight Simulators that are full motion, Level D simulators.

In March 2022, ATP purchased 20 advanced aviation training devices (AATDs) from Frasca International. The devices are equipped with Garmin G1000 avionics, and feature “220-degree wrap-around visuals and active control loading paired with modeled flight data to replicate the aerodynamics and control feedback of the actual aircraft.” They were configured to represent the flight decks of either Piper Archers or Cessna Skyhawks.

=== Maintenance Centers ===
As of 2024, ATP operates 26 dedicated maintenance centers to ensure the reliability of its fleet. The largest of these maintenance bases is located at Phoenix-Mesa Gateway Airport.

== Airline hiring relationships ==
ATP Flight School has hiring relationships with 37 U.S. based regional airlines, major airlines, and corporate operators, including American Airlines, Delta Air Lines, Envoy, Frontier, Avelo, Wheels Up, Sun Country, Republic Airways, Jet Linx, Ameriflight, SkyWest Airlines, Endeavor Air, Mesa Airlines,PSA Airlines, and United Airlines. Through these partnerships, a limited number of top graduates from ATP's professional pilot program are eligible to be interviewed for entry-level positions. ATP was the first flight school to initiate airline-paid tuition reimbursement.

As of March, 2022, the flight school reported having 1,210 airline placements in the past 12 months, which is the highest ratio of airline placements to students of any flight school, aviation college, or flight academy.

=== American Airlines ===
In 2025, American Airlines broadened its pilot training program through a partnership with ATP Flight School in Charlotte, North Carolina. As part of this collaboration, ATP expanded its facilities at Concord Regional Airport in Charlotte, including the development of a new hangar, simulator rooms, and a testing center. Graduates of this training program are provided with priority consideration for positions at American Airlines' regional airline affiliates. Since 2004, ATP Flight School has facilitated the placement of over 1,500 pilots with these regional partners of American Airlines.

=== Avelo Direct Program ===
Students in this program complete ATP's Airline Transport Pilot Certification Training Program (ATP CTP), work with ATP as instructors to accumulate the 1,500 hours of flight time needed for the airline transport pilot rating, and then can advance to first-officer positions with Avelo.

Prior to advancing to Avelo, pilots complete the ATP CTP, which includes 10 hours of training in a Boeing 737 level 4/5/6 Flight Training Devices (FTDs) and a level D Full Flight Simulator. Next, students log eight hours in Boeing 737 Level 5/6 FTDs and four more hours in a Level D Full Flight Simulator. Finally, students log four hours of training in ATP's fundamentals of operating Flight Management Systems (FMSs).

=== Breeze Embark Program ===
This is ATP's program with Breeze Airways. Eligible ATP instructors can interview with Breeze once they have 500 hours of total time. If selected, they receive a conditional job offer and mentoring from Breeze crew members. Instructors can accept the offer after logging 1,500 hours of flight time and completing the Airline Transport Pilot Certification Training Program (ATP CTP) with ATP. They join Breeze as first officers of Embraer E190 jets.

=== Delta Air Lines/Endeavor Air ===
ATP Flight School and Delta Air Lines expanded their partnership in 2024 with a new pathway for ATP certified flight instructors within the Delta Propel Pilot Career Path program. Eligible instructors earn a conditional job offer from Delta and mentorship from a Propel pilot. Participants are required to gain experience as captains at Endeavor Air for at least 24 months before becoming eligible for potential employment at Delta. This program builds upon the existing Student to Endeavor Pilot Program (STEP), which facilitates experience acquisition with Endeavor Air for ATP students and instructors as part of a structured career path towards Delta Air Lines.

=== Envoy Cadet Program ===
In 2018, ATP and Envoy Air, a wholly owned subsidiary of American Airlines Group, established a partnership through the Envoy Cadet Program. This program provides ATP flight instructors with a pathway to a pilot career with American Airlines, along with financial assistance and health benefits.

=== Frontier Pilot Cadet Program ===
In partnership with Frontier Airlines, ATP launched the Frontier Direct Program in January, 2021. This program includes training at an ATP campus, a stipend, and a guaranteed position as a Frontier Airlines first officer after meeting all requirements. Training includes private pilot, instrument, commercial single engine, commercial multi-engine, certified flight instructor, certified flight instructor instrument, multi-engine flight instructor, and flight instructing or flying for a 135 operation (logging 1,500 qualifying flight hours).

=== GoJet Airlines ===
There is a tuition reimbursement program offered by GoJet for ATP students. Under the program, accepted students receive financial assistance in exchange for a commitment to fly with the airline after acquiring the requisite 1,500 flight hours.

=== Jet Linx ===
In April 2022, Jet Linx, a private aviation company, partnered with ATP to provide a “direct pathway” for ATP students to receive first officer job offers.

=== Republic Airways ===
Under the company's agreement with Republic Airways, students have the opportunity to interview for a job during the instrument phase of training and receive conditional offers of employment. Students must log 1,500 hours and pass the FAA's Airline Transport Pilot checkride before any offer can be accepted.

=== Spirit Direct Program ===
In February 2022, Spirit Airlines and ATP announced a new partnership. Students accepted to the program complete a two-year advanced training curriculum and are hired to pilot one of Spirit's Airbus A320s.

=== Sun Country Direct Program ===
This program was announced in July 2021 as a “direct pathway” for ATP graduates to join Sun Country Airlines as Boeing 737 first officers.

=== United Aviate Program ===
ATP Flight School is a partner of United Airlines in the Aviate Program. Students accepted to the program first complete certain training and requirements with ATP, then must spend a minimum of 24 months and 2,000 cockpit hours flying for a United Express regional partner airline before being eligible to transfer to United Airlines.

=== Wheels Up ===
Wheels Up, an on-demand charter aviation company, announced a hiring partnership with ATP in August 2022. ATP flight instructors become eligible to interview with Wheels Up once they have 1,000 hours of total flight time. Those selected can receive a conditional job offer to fly as first officers on Beechcraft King Air 350, Cessna Citation CJ3, or Beechjet 400 aircraft.

== Accidents and incidents ==
On December 6, 2008, a Cessna 172 operated by ATP Flight School was involved in a midair collision with another training aircraft, a twin-engine Piper PA-44. The collision occurred 18 miles west of the Ft. Lauderdale Hollywood International Airport (FLL) in Ft. Lauderdale, Florida. The two pilots of the ATP aircraft suffered fatal injuries, as did the two pilots of the Piper Seminole.

On March 24, 2014, a twin-engine Piper PA-44 owned by ATP Flight School crashed near Brunswick Georgia after a suspected break-up of the airframe in IFR conditions. Both pilots suffered fatal injuries in the accident. A lawsuit was filed on behalf of the deceased pilots' families.

On May 29, 2021, a Cessna 172 on an introductory flight crashed near Powder Mountain Ski Resort in Ogden, Utah. The flight student and instructor both died.

On January 24, 2024, an ATP Flight School student took a Cessna 172 aircraft without authorization from Addison Airport (ADS), situated north of Dallas, Texas. The student who was also a private pilot died when the aircraft crashed. Authorities investigated the crash as potentially intentional.

On August 7, 2026, a Cessna 172S, registration N1842E, registered to ATP Aircraft 6 LLC, crashed into Utah Lake shortly after departing Provo Municipal Airport in Provo, Utah. A private pilot who was pursuing a career as a commercial pilot, was killed, while the other occupant survived with injuries. The aircraft sustained substantial damage. The National Transportation Safety Board opened an investigation into the accident."AIN Detail Report – N1842E". Federal Aviation Administration. Federal Aviation Administration.Hatch, Heidi (August 10, 2026). "Family identifies man killed in Utah Lake plane crash as aspiring commercial pilot". KUTV.
