= Alien Flight Student Program =

US Transportation Security Administration screening program

The Alien Flight Student Program (AFSP; designation no longer used since January 26, 2022) or Flight Training Security Program (FTSP; current designation after January 26, 2022) is a program operated by the United States Transportation Security Administration (TSA) to screen prospective flight student candidates who are not citizens of the United States, before they are allowed to undergo pilot training. This program was created in response to the September 11, 2001 attacks, in recognition of the fact that the individuals who piloted the hijacked aircraft first learned to fly at US flight schools.

The mission of the program is to ensure that foreign students seeking training at flight schools regulated by the Federal Aviation Administration (FAA) do not pose a threat to aviation or national security. Section 612 of the Vision 100 – Century of Aviation Reauthorization Act (Public Law 108-176, December 12, 2003) prohibits flight schools regulated by the FAA from providing flight training to a foreign student unless the Secretary of Homeland Security first determines that the student does not pose a threat to aviation or national security. Vision 100 transferred responsibility for conducting security threat assessments for foreign students seeking flight training from the Department of Justice to the Department of Homeland Security. On September 20, 2004, the TSA issued an interim final rule establishing the Alien Flight Student Program (AFSP).

Persons seeking flight training must submit a request if they are not citizens or nationals of the U.S. and:

- They wish to receive flight training in the U.S. or its territories, regardless of whether training will lead to an FAA certificate or type rating; and/or
- They wish to receive flight training from an FAA-certificated facility, provider, or instructor that could lead to an FAA rating whether in the U.S. or abroad.

(NOTE-Certain exemptions to AFSP published in 2004 and 2005 are still in effect.)

The rule as written has a broad scope, and at first seemed to pilots to extend to required regular flight reviews as well proficiency training given to non-citizen private pilots. After consultation with the pilot community, the TSA issued clarifications restricting the scope of the program: for example, in small airplanes, it only applies to pilots undergoing training for an initial certificate, a multi-engine rating, or an instrument rating.

Candidates log onto the AFSP Candidate website to submit their background information and flight training request(s). Once the application process is completed, the AFSP performs a security threat assessment to determine whether the Candidate poses a threat to aviation or national security.

On December 22, 2021, the program was renamed Flight Transportation Security Program (FTSP).
