= Airplane Single Engine Land =

Part of the Federal Aviation Administration testing and certification standard

An Airplane, Single Engine, Land certificate (ASEL) is part of the Federal Aviation Administration (FAA) testing and certification standard: within a privilege level, it is a class rating as part of pilot certification in the United States. An ASEL identifies that the pilot in question holds a pilot license for a fixed-wing aircraft that has a single engine and only lands on land—not a seaplane. ASEL is the most common license sought by private pilots; to specify that it is a Private Pilot License, it can be referred to as P/ASEL or PP-ASEL.

== See also ==
- Pilot certification in the United States
