= Ground Instructor =

Ground Instructor is a certificate issued in the United States by the Federal Aviation Administration (FAA). There are three classes of holder, licensed to provide the ground instruction element in the training of three groups:

- Basic Ground Instructor (BGI) – for a sport pilot, recreational pilot, or private pilot certificate.
- Advanced Ground Instructor (AGI) – for any certificate except the instrument rating.
- Instrument Ground Instructor (IGI) – for the addition of an instrument rating to a pilot certificate.

== Legal provisions ==
Ground Instructor is a certificate issued in the United States by the Federal Aviation Administration; the rules for certification, and for certificate-holders, are detailed in Subpart I of Part 61 of the Federal Aviation Regulations, which are part of Title 14 of the Code of Federal Regulations. The Ground Instructor certificate allows the holder to offer various kinds of ground instruction required of those seeking pilot certificates and ratings. Ground Instructor certificates are issued with ratings, and these determine the exact areas in which the holder may give instruction.

== Requirements ==
An applicant for a Ground Instructor certificate is not required to be a pilot, but must meet certain requirements, including being at least 18 years of age and being able to read, write, speak, and understand the English language. In addition, the applicant must pass a written knowledge test on the fundamentals of instructing. Exceptions to this requirement are made for persons who hold flight instructor certificates (and so have already taken this test), for persons who hold a teacher's certificate authorizing instruction at the seventh-grade or above, and for persons who teach at accredited colleges or universities.

The applicant must also pass a test appropriate to the rating desired. This is a written exam similar to, but showing a higher knowledge, of aviation than those required for a private or commercial airplane license, or an instrument rating.

== Ratings ==
A Ground Instructor certificate is issued with at least one of three ratings: Basic, Advanced, and Instrument. At most only two would appear on the certificate, basic and instrument, or advanced and instrument.

The Basic Ground Instructor (BGI) rating allows the holder to give the ground instruction required for a sport pilot, recreational pilot, or private pilot certificate. The ground instructor certificate holder may also endorse a student to take the written knowledge test for these pilot certificates. The holder of a Basic Ground Instructor rating is additionally allowed to give the ground instruction required for a sport pilot, recreational pilot, or private pilot flight review.

The Advanced Ground Instructor (AGI) rating allows the holder to give the ground instruction required for any certificate or, effectively, any rating (except for the Instrument Rating) issued under Part 61, to give the ground training for any flight review, and to endorse a student to take the written knowledge test for any certificate or non-instrument rating issued under Part 61. The AGI rating has more extensive privileges than the BGI. Obtaining the BGI first is not a requirement for the AGI. Applicants often skip the BGI, since the AGI has more authority. The questions for both ratings are taken from the same pool. The only difference is that the AGI requires a somewhat longer examination.

The Instrument Ground Instructor (IGI) rating allows the holder to give the ground instruction required for the addition of an instrument rating to a pilot certificate; the holder may also endorse a student to take the written knowledge test for the instrument rating, and can give the ground training required for an instrument proficiency check., It does not, however, authorize the holder to give instruction in simulators.

== Validity ==
Ground Instructor certificates do not expire. To be eligible to give instruction, though, the holder must have either served as an instructor in the preceding twelve months or have received from a ground or flight instructor an endorsement certifying the holder's proficiency in the subject matter which the certificate authorizes teaching. A yearly Flight Instructor Recertification Course (FIRC) will also suffice.

== See also ==
- Pilot certification in the United States
- Bárány chair
