= Cross-country flying =

Cross-country flying (a.k.a. XC flying) is a type of distance flying which is performed in a powered aircraft on legs over a given distance and in operations between two points using navigational techniques; and an unpowered aircraft (paraglider, hang glider or sailplane) by using upcurrents to gain altitude for extended flying time. Cross country is distinct from purely aerial work in a small defined area requiring little navigation.

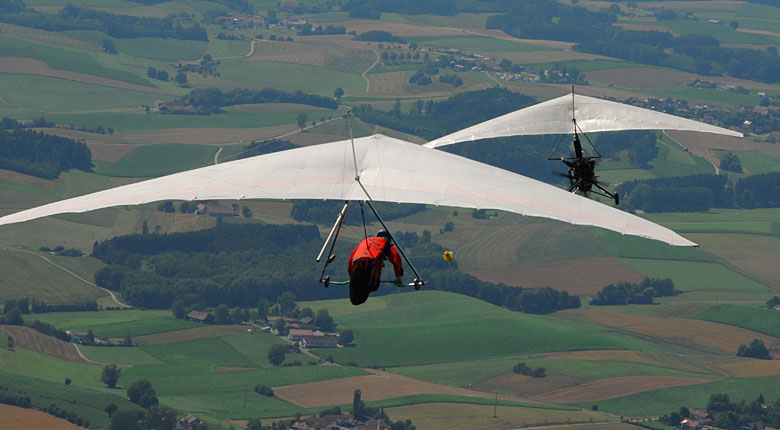
Hang gliding

Cross-country flight time is required by many countries for the issuance of various pilot licences. For example, in EASA states, all pilot licences and instrument ratings have minimum cross-country flight time requirements.

== Official definitions by country ==
=== Canada ===
Transport Canada does not provide a definition of "cross-country" flight in the Canadian Aviation Regulations (CARs), however, a general consensus among pilots is that, in order to log "cross-country time" in a pilot's logbook, the pilot must have demonstrated some kind of navigational ability during the logged period of time. This is substantiated by references to:

- the requirement to file a flight plan beyond 25 nautical miles of the departure aerodrome for "cross-country flights,"
- the requirement to carry an Emergency Locator Transmitter for "cross-country flights," and
- the stipulations in the Commercial Licence Requirements for travel between two different airports.

In many cases, however, there are conflicts of opinion as to the definition; if, for example, a pilot flew from Langley Airport (CYNJ) to Abbotsford Airport (CYXX), the distance would be only 12 NM. In this instance, calling the flight "cross-country" seems not to fit within the requirement to use "navigational ability" since the two airports are within sight of one another even from very low altitudes.

=== European Union (EU) countries ===
==== General Definition ====
In the context of aviation regulations, such as EASA or FAA, a cross-country flight often has specific definitions and conditions depending on the purpose. In Commission Regulation (EU) No 1178/2011, cross-country flight is defined as "a flight between a point of departure and a point of arrival following a pre-planned route, using standard navigation procedures". (Note: Commission Regulation (EU) No 1178/2011: annex I.) It is mentioned in the context of requirements for pilot training, licensing, and certification. Specifically, it is included as part of the criteria for obtaining various licenses, such as the Private Pilot License (PPL), Commercial Pilot License (CPL), and Instrument Rating (IR).

==== Regulatory Requirements (e.g., for pilot training) ====
For obtaining a private pilot license (PPL), commercial pilot license (CPL), or instrument rating (IR), cross-country flight requirements often include minimum distances, flight time, and landings at designated points. Cross-country flying emphasizes navigation skills, including map reading, chart plotting, GPS usage, and handling en-route airspace transitions.

- European Union Aviation Safety Agency (EASA): Cross-country flight requirements may vary but typically include multiple legs and landings at aerodromes other than the departure airport.
- Federal Aviation Administration (FAA): For certain certifications, a cross-country flight must include: A landing at an airport that is more than 50 nautical miles from the departure point.

=== United Kingdom ===
In the United Kingdom, cross-country flight is defined as "any flight during the course of which the aircraft is more than three nautical miles from the aerodrome of departure."

=== United States ===
Under Title 14 of the code of federal regulations (14 CFR) part 61, the Federal Aviation Administration (FAA), defines cross-country flight time with specific conditions that vary depending on the type of pilot certificate being sought.

Generally, it refers to a flight conducted by a certificated pilot in an aircraft that includes a landing at a point that differs from the departure point, using navigational methods such as pilotage, dead reckoning, or electronic aids.

Different certificate levels and aircraft categories have varying minimum distance requirements for what counts as cross-country flight time:

- Private Pilot Certificate, Commercial Pilot Certificate, and Instrument Rating: Must include a landing more than 50 nautical miles away.
- Sport Pilot Certificate (except powered parachutes): Must include a landing more than 25 nautical miles away.
- Sport Pilot or Private Pilot (Powered Parachute): Must include a landing more than 15 nautical miles away.
- Rotorcraft (including helicopter) Certificate and Ratings: Must include a landing more than 25 nautical miles away.
- Airline Transport Pilot (ATP) Certificate (except rotorcraft): Must include a landing more than 50 nautical miles away.
- Military Pilots Applying for a Civilian Commercial Certificate: Must include a landing more than 50 nautical miles away.
