= Civil Aviation Safety Authority =

Australia's national civil aviation authority

Agency overview
- Formed: 6 July 1995
- Preceding agency: Civil Aviation Authority
- Jurisdiction: Australian Civil Aviation
- Headquarters: Canberra, Australian Capital Territory
- Agency executive: Pip Spence, CEO and DAS
- Parent agency: DITRDCA
- Website: www.casa.gov.au

The Civil Aviation Safety Authority (CASA) is an Australian statutory authority responsible for the regulation and safety oversight of Australia's civil aviation. CASA was formed on 6 July 1995 under the Civil Aviation Act 1988 when the Civil Aviation Authority was split into two separate government bodies: Airservices Australia and CASA.

CASA is an agency within the Department of Infrastructure, Transport, Regional Development, Communications and the Arts (DITRDCA). Directors are appointed by the minister.

CASA is responsible for monitoring civil air operations in Australia, issuing appropriate licences, enforcing safety requirements and protecting the environment from the effects of aircraft use. Air traffic control in Australian air space falls under the statutory mandated responsibility and role of Airservices Australia.

== Role ==
The Civil Aviation Safety Authority uses the Australian Civil Aviation Ensign

CASA licences pilots, ground crew, aircraft and airfield operators. It is also responsible for enforcing safety requirements under the Commonwealth Civil Aviation Act 1988 and the Air Navigation Act 1920 and it must carry out its responsibilities in accordance with the Airspace Act 2007. Although it is a corporate body distinct from the Australian Government, CASA is responsible to the Federal Minister for Infrastructure and Transport.

CASA was established on 6 July 1995 and its functions are defined by the Civil Aviation Act 1988. Those functions include conducting the safety regulation of:

- civil air operations in Australian territory
- operation of Australian aircraft outside Australian territory
- developing and promulgating appropriate, clear and concise aviation safety standards
- developing effective enforcement strategies to secure compliance with aviation safety standards
- administering drug and alcohol management plans and testing
- issuing certificates, licenses, registrations and permits
- conducting comprehensive aviation industry surveillance
- conducting regular reviews of the system of civil aviation safety in order to monitor the safety performance of the aviation industry
- conducting regular assessment of international safety developments

CASA must regard the safety of air navigation as the most important consideration, however it must exercise its powers and perform its functions in a manner that ensures, as far as is practicable, the environment is protected from: (a) the effects of the operation and use of aircraft; and (b) the effects associated with the operation and use of aircraft. In practice there is uncertainty concerning which body assumes meaningful responsibility for the impact of aviation on the environment.

== See also ==
- Pilot licensing in Australia
