= Designated Pilot Examiner =

In the United States, a Designated Pilot Evaluator (DPE) is a senior pilot who examines applicants for a Pilot Certificate on behalf of the Federal Aviation Administration (FAA). The DPE must check applicants’ qualifications, conduct an oral test of their mental skills and judgment, and perform a practical test in flight.

== Authority ==
A Designated Pilot Examiner (commonly referred to as a DPE) is a senior pilot designated by the FAA to conduct oral examinations and inflight or flight simulator checkrides (collectively called "practical tests") with pilot applicants to determine their suitability to be issued a Pilot Certificate or additional rating on their Pilot Certificate. Certain DPEs also have authority to issue Flight Instructor Certificates and associated additional ratings. At the completion of the testing procedures, DPEs issue a "Temporary Airman Certificate" (pilot certificate) with the new qualifications or ratings, to be followed by a regular, credit-card-like certificate from FAA Airman Records following review of the certification file.

The process to become a DPE involves joining a waiting list with the FAA, sometimes for 10 years or longer depending on the need of the local FAA Flight Standards District Office (FSDO). Once the FSDO accepts an applicant he/she travels to an FAA training facility (usually a course at the FAA Academy in Oklahoma City) for training and testing.

DPEs are required to attend biennial recurrent training conducted by the FAA, and annual standardization meetings with their supervising FSDOs—as well as being examined regularly by FAA Aviation Safety Inspectors conducting "ridealong" flights or oral reviews.

The general guidelines by which DPEs examine pilots are called Airman Certification Standards, which began replacing the Practical Test Standards system in 2016. DPEs are not FAA employees and charge fees for their services, but they "act for the Administrator (of the FAA)" to augment the limited availability of FAA Aviation Safety Inspectors; more than 90 percent of pilot certification checkrides in the U.S. are conducted by DPEs.

The quality of the DPE system is assured by constant FAA oversight and annual re-certification of all Pilot Examiners. The FAA maintains a list of all Designated Pilot Examiners and the tests they are qualified to accomplish. The FAA tries to assure that no applicant need wait more than a week or travel more than 100 miles (160 km) to obtain their flight test. The majority of pilot examiners make their living flying in some capacity (flight instructor, airline or charter flight) and often perform the duties of DPE as a service to the industry.

== Duties ==
The first step in the examination process is making sure the applicant is qualified for the flight evaluation. The DPE will check photo identification, student certificate and all the instructor recommendations for accuracy. In addition, all of the FAA experience requirements must be verified before any evaluation can begin.

The discussion (oral) portion of a flight evaluation precedes any flight per FAA requirements. If correctly performed, this is a scenario-based discussion that leads the applicant through mental challenges similar to what any pilot may encounter later in their flying career. The DPE is to test the applicant's thinking and judgment skills. Many tasks in the FAA evaluation are mandated due to previous accident analysis of pilot errors. Since over 80% of aircraft accidents are caused by pilot error, the knowledge and judgment of a pilot must be carefully tested.

Once the oral is successfully completed, the DPE will perform the flight part of the test. Many eager pilot applicants forget at this point that they are the ultimate arbiters of acceptable flight conditions. Every flight evaluation by the FAA may result in a "discontinuance" if the weather is deemed unacceptable by the applicant. Trying to prove extraordinary skills in a hurricane-force wind is not required (or advisable). The pilot examiner should be watching for good judgment on the part of the pilot applicant when evaluating the weather conditions.

Acceptable tolerances for every flight maneuver are carefully stated in each of the FAA Practical Test Standards. The DPE must determine the applicant's skill; perfection is not the standard but the DPE should watch for prompt correction if a deviation occurs.
