= Flight review =

A flight review is a study program and flight instructor examination of aviation piloting skills. Periodic flight reviews are a pilot licensing requirement mandated by the aviation authorities of many countries. These reviews take different forms in different countries.

== Flight reviews in the United States ==
In the United States, flight reviews are required every two years, and thus were formerly called biennial flight reviews (BFRs).

For holders of pilot certificates issued by the U.S. Federal Aviation Administration (FAA), a flight review is required of every active holder of a U.S. pilot certificate at least every two years. The flight review consists of at least 1 hour of ground instruction and 1 hour in-flight with a qualified flight instructor, although completion of any Phase of the FAA WINGS program also satisfies the requirement for a flight review.

Federal Aviation Regulation (FAR) 61.56 specifies that the review must include:

1. A review of the current general operating and flight rules of part 91 of the FAR; and
2. A review of those maneuvers and procedures that, at the discretion of the person giving the review, are necessary for the pilot to demonstrate the safe exercise of the privileges of the pilot certificate.

Before being able to act as pilot in command (PIC) in the United States, a pilot must have completed a flight review within the previous 24 calendar months. The FAA and instructors are quick to point out that it is not a pass/fail or graded test. There are no pass or fail criteria, although the instructor giving it can decline to endorse the pilot's log book to certify that a flight review has been completed.

A flight test (administered by an FAA representative Designated Pilot Examiner) that leads to a new certificate or rating may be substituted for the flight review. A proficiency check conducted by a Certified Flight Instructor for an additional Sport Pilot privilege may also be substituted for a flight review.

Completion of a proficiency check administered by a check pilot (typically air carrier pilots) can also be used.
