= Flight dispatcher =

Flight planning and management specialist within the operations centre of an airline

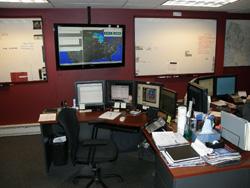
A small airline's dispatch office.

A flight dispatcher (also known as an airline dispatcher or flight operations officer) assists in planning flight paths, taking into account aircraft performance and loading, enroute winds, thunderstorm and turbulence forecasts, airspace restrictions, and airport conditions. Dispatchers also provide a flight following service and advise pilots if conditions change. They usually work in the operations center of the airline. In the United States and Canada, the flight dispatcher shares legal responsibility with the commander of the aircraft (joint responsibility dispatch system).

== Operational control ==
Dispatchers usually share responsibility for the exercise of operational control, which gives them authority to divert, delay or cancel a flight. Legal requirements known as "14 CFR part 121" govern dispatch release in the United States. After the release of a flight (in a joint responsibility environment) the dispatcher uses sophisticated software tools to monitor the flight's progress and advises the flight crew of any circumstances that might affect flight safety. They are in constant communication with the air crew and could be contacted through phone, radio, and ACARS (aircraft communications and reporting system). Shared responsibility adds a layer of checks and balances to aircraft operation and greatly improves safety.

Joint Aviation Authorities (JAR) OPS 1 did mandate the use of an operational control system with flight dispatchers/joint responsibility/flight watch. The pan-European European Aviation Safety Agency (EASA) issued a requirement mandating the use of such an operational control system.

The International Civil Aviation Organization (ICAO), headquartered in Montreal, is the civil aviation branch of the UN (United Nations). ICAO states that the operator (the airline), is responsible for the operational control of its flights and only recognizes dispatch systems using flight dispatchers/flight operations officers as the means to control and supervise flights in Annex 6, Part 1, Chapter 3. Chapter 4 of Annex 6 describes the duties of flight dispatchers/flight operations officers while Chapter 10 of Annex 6 describes the training and qualification requirements for flight dispatchers/flight operations officers. Chapter 10 also recognizes ICAO Document 7192 D3, The Flight Dispatcher/Flight Operations Officer Training Manual as the standard training resource for member States to develop their own flight dispatcher/flight operations officer training regulations.

The terms "flight dispatcher", "aircraft dispatcher" and "flight operations officer" are largely interchangeable depending on the area of the world in which they are used. The term "Aircraft dispatcher" is used in the United States, while "flight operations officer" is more common in Europe and Africa, and "flight dispatcher" is typically used in Asia and the Middle East.

== Licensing and certification ==
A dispatcher must be certified by the aviation authority of the country in which they operate or have a base of operations, such as the DGCA in India and the FAA/DOT (Federal Aviation Administration/Department of Transportation) in the United States. In order to obtain a certificate, a candidate must demonstrate extensive knowledge of meteorology and of aviation in general, to a level comparable to the holder of an Airline Transport Pilot (ATP) certificate.

The FAA ATP and the FAA Dispatcher (ADX) written exams are similar. For airlines operating under 14 CFR Part 135, dispatching duties and responsibilities are actually designated to "flight followers." The main difference between a flight dispatcher and a flight follower is that the latter does not share legal responsibility for the operation of a flight. In addition, a flight follower is not required to obtain a dispatcher's certificate, although they are usually encouraged to do so by the airline for which they work and will probably not be employed as a flight follower if they do not have the dispatcher certificate.

Many countries issue licenses or certificates which are based on ICAO Annex 1 and 6 as well as ICAO DOC 7192 D3. Unfortunately not all countries have adopted a mandatory license/certification and joint responsibility/flight watch operational control systems. The FAA has mandated the use of flight dispatchers/joint responsibility/flight watch since the "Civil Aeronautic Act" was passed in 1938. Canada has adopted a similar approach in the wake of the Air Ontario Flight 1363 plane crash in Dryden, Ontario, in 1989. Due to several more accidents, the FAA is lobbying the ICAO for tighter regulations.

== Legal responsibility ==
Flight dispatchers are legally 50% responsible for the safety of every flight they dispatch. The pilot in command of the flight holds responsibility for the other 50%. A flight dispatcher has the legal authority to refuse to dispatch a flight if safety is in any way in question, as does the pilot in command. This is known as 'Co-Authority Dispatch'. Because commercial decision making in an airline can conflict with the safety of a flight, a flight dispatcher's responsibilities are kept separate from the commercial aspects of an airline's operation, and as such the profession is primarily focused on the safety of a flight; all other duties are secondary.

Flight dispatchers in a typical airline are generally responsible for overseeing anywhere from 10 to 25 flights simultaneously, depending on the daily ops tempo/operation as some flights are much more strenuous than others as an ETOPS Air charter requires much more attention than those of a regular scheduled flight. All the while dispatchers are also constantly planning new flights while monitoring current ones. Flight dispatchers are expected to have a big picture view of weather conditions, aircraft status, fuel planning, and other operational aspects of maintaining smooth airline operations. Because of the constantly changing nature of airline operations, flight dispatchers experience a high level of stress in the workplace, as they balance operational constraints and pressures with the overriding safety mandate of the job.

== Load planner ==
Often (especially in larger airlines) a dispatcher will be assisted by a load planner. They must carefully plan the loading of the aircraft and do the weight and balance calculations for the aircraft. In some cargo aircraft, they have to visually inspect the loading, making sure it has been done in accordance with their instructions. When a load planner is on board the airplane as a member of the crew, he or she will be in charge of planning, loading and offloading the cargo for the duration of the flight, and is known as loadmaster.

== Flight follower ==
In some jurisdictions of the US, similar duties and responsibilities are designated to flight followers. The main difference between the aircraft dispatcher and the flight follower is that the latter does not share legal responsibility for the operation of a flight. During the flight, the dispatcher is required to monitor and advise the crew of changes affecting safety of flight. In flight following, ultimate responsibility and operational control of the flight rests with the Pilot in command and Director of Operations (DO). Flight followers work for the Director of Operations and are tasked with carrying out operational control functions. Flight followers are not required to attain a flight dispatcher's certificate, although they are usually encouraged to do so.
