= Class rating =

Allowance to fly aircraft of similar design

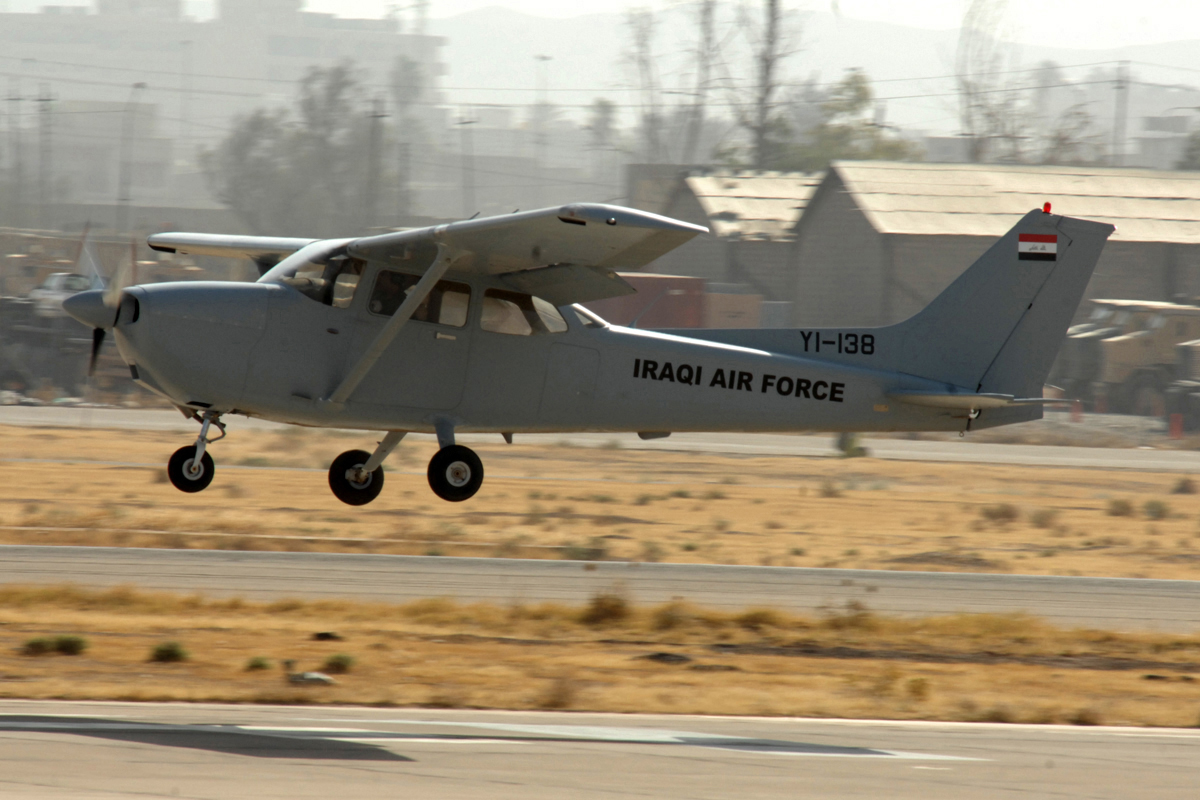
An example of a single engine land class aircraft, the ubiquitous Cessna 172

In aviation, a class rating is an allowance to fly a certain group of aircraft that require training common to all aircraft within the group. A type rating is specified if a particular aircraft requires additional specialized training beyond the scope of initial license and aircraft class training. Which aircraft require a type rating is decided by the local aviation authority. Almost all single-engine piston (SEP) or multi-engine piston (MEP) single pilot aircraft can be flown without a type rating, but are covered by a class rating instead.

== United States ==
In the United States, all turbojets require a type rating. Aircraft with a maximum take-off weight of more than 12,500 pounds (5,700 kg) typically require a type rating.

In the United States, there are seven categories of aircraft, which contain the following classes:

Category	Class	Category	Class
Airplane	Single-engine land (ASEL)	Lighter-than-air	Airship
Airplane	Multiengine land (AMEL)	Lighter-than-air	Balloon
Airplane	Single-engine sea (ASES)	Powered-lift	—
Airplane	Multiengine sea (AMES)	Powered parachute	Powered parachute land
Rotorcraft	Helicopter	Powered parachute	Powered parachute sea
Rotorcraft	Gyroplane	Weight-shift-control aircraft	Weight-shift-control aircraft land
Glider	—	Weight-shift-control aircraft	Weight-shift-control aircraft sea

Class ratings may have limitations placed upon them. In the United States, if a pilot being examined for a multi-engine rating does not demonstrate the ability to control an aircraft under asymmetric thrust, their multi-engine rating will be endorsed as "Limited-to-Center Thrust". (In the European Union, a multi-engine centreline thrust aeroplane is considered a single-engine aeroplane when being used for an instrument rating skill test.)

== Gallery ==
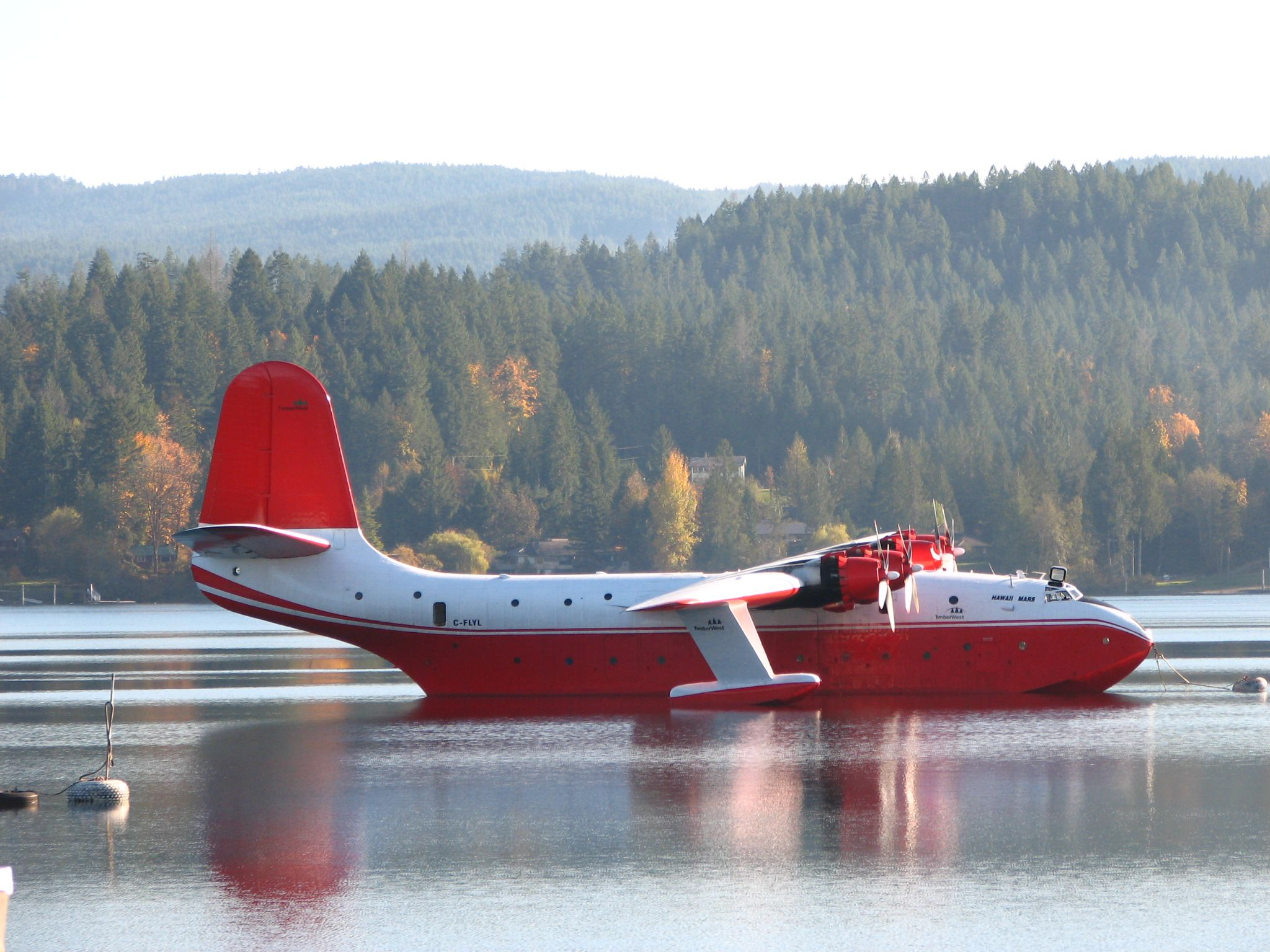
A Mars water bomber, one of the largest multi-engine sea-class aircraft

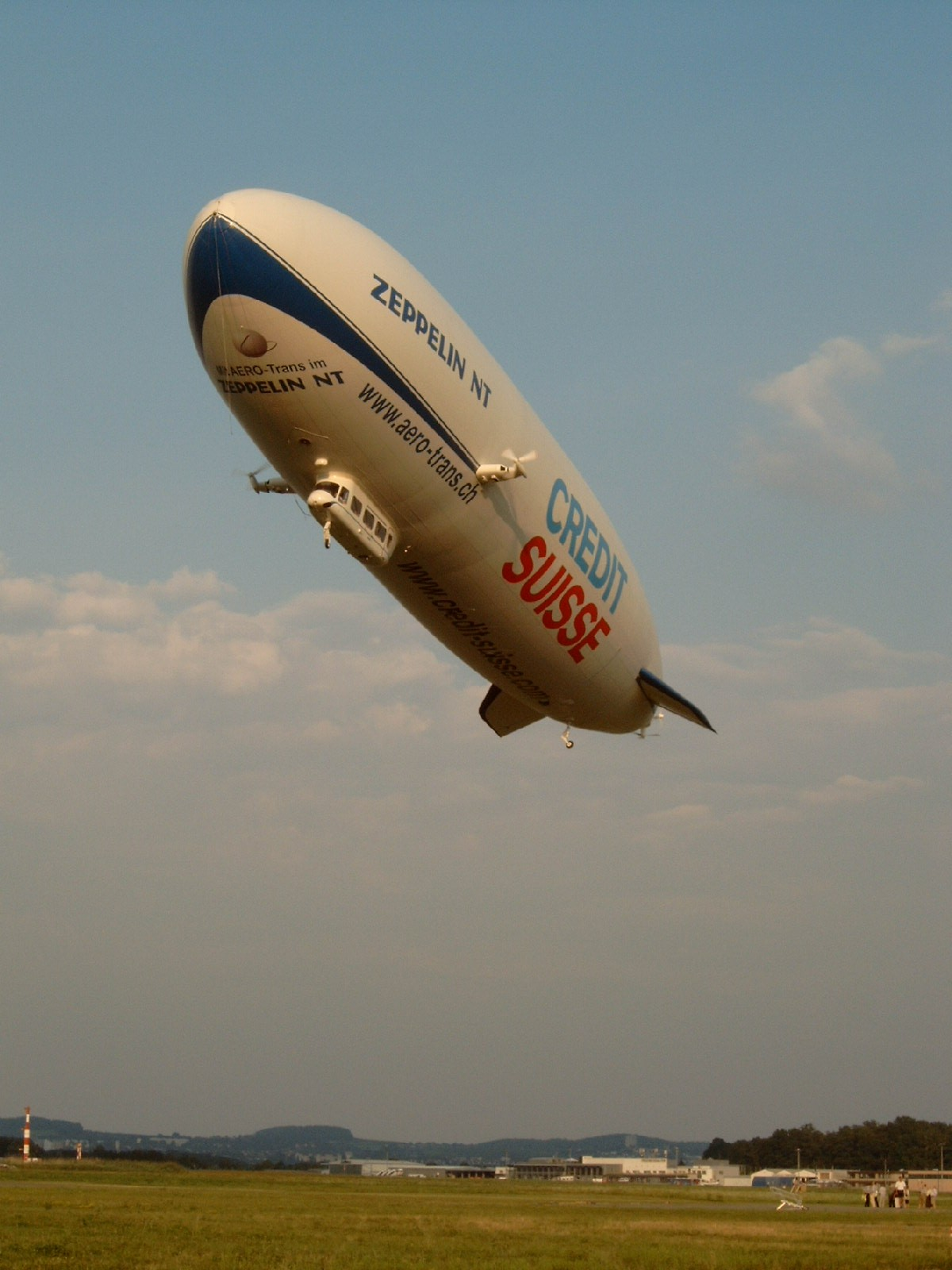
An airship class aircraft in the aerostat category, a Zeppelin NT

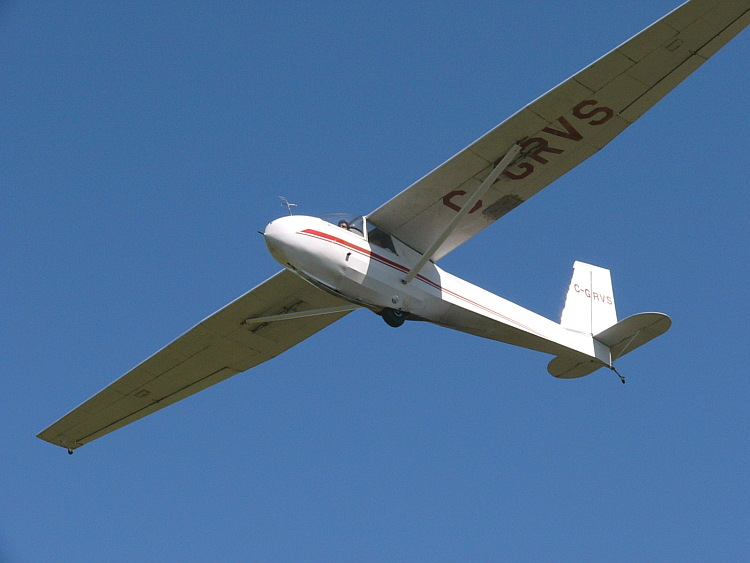
An example of a glider class aircraft, a Schweizer SGS 2-33

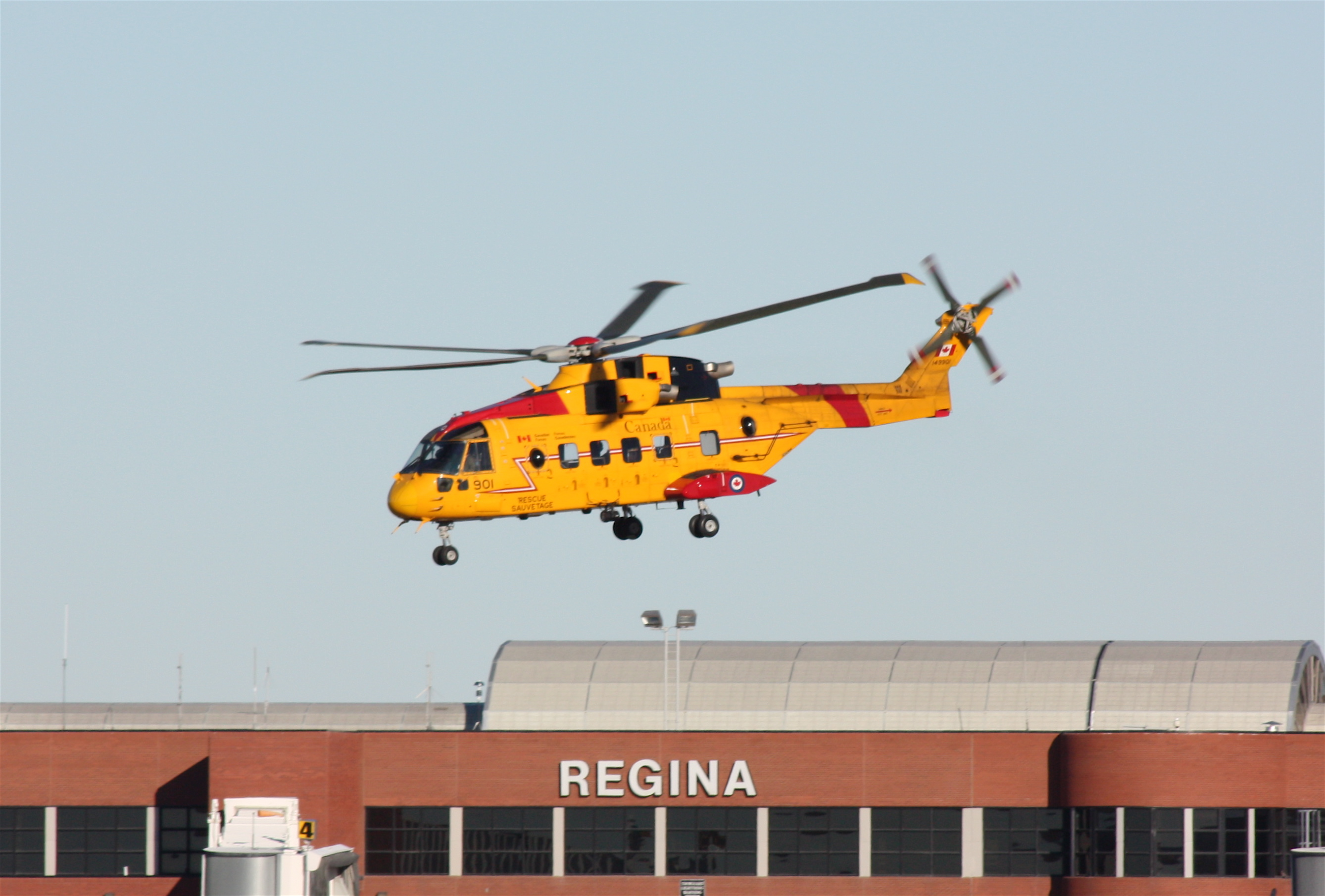
An example of a rotorcraft class aircraft, a CH-149 Cormorant helicopter

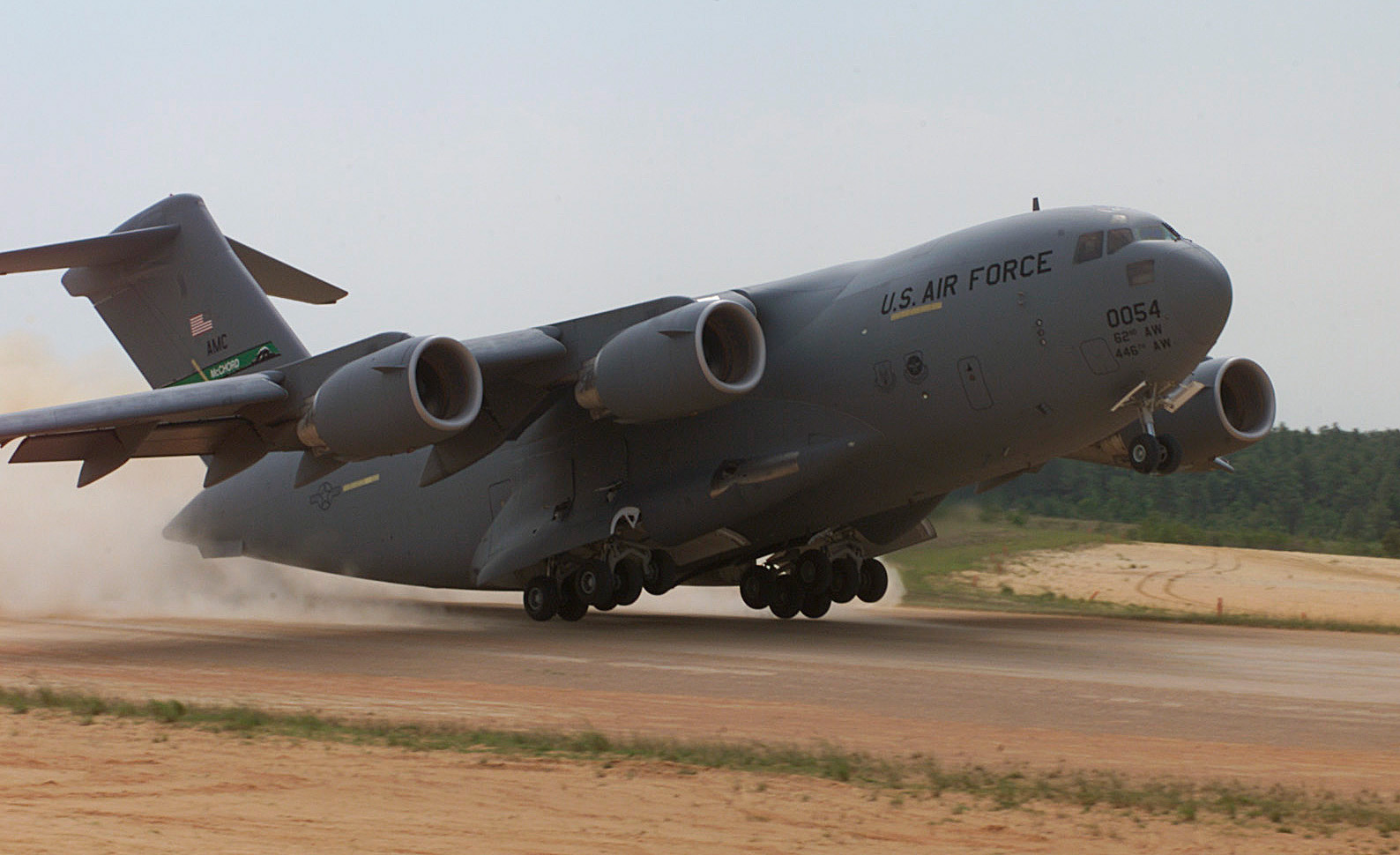
An example of a very large multi-engine class aircraft, a C-17 Globemaster III

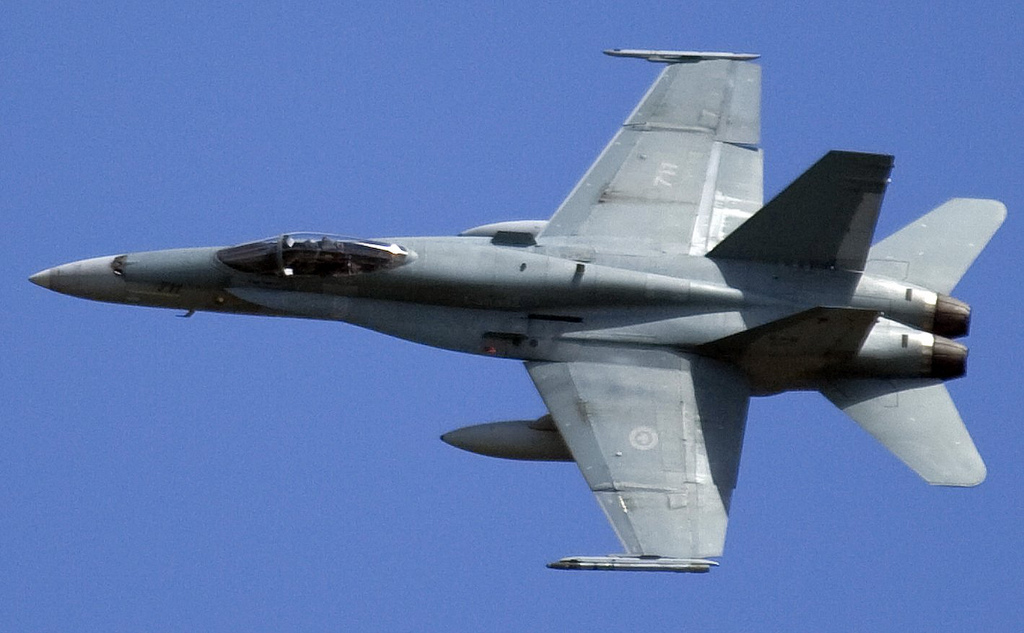
An example of a jet fighter aircraft, a CF-18 Hornet

== See also ==
- Instrument rating
