= Night rating =

Pilot rating for night time visual flight

A night rating permits an aircraft pilot to fly at night under visual flight rules. The alternative is flight by instrument flight rules (IFR), under which visual reference to terrain and traffic is not required.

In aviation, "night" is defined as the period from "the end of evening civil twilight to the beginning of morning civil twilight".

In EASA states and the United Kingdom, the requirements for a night rating for aeroplanes are:

- theoretical instruction
- at least 5 hours of flight time in the appropriate aircraft category at night, including at least 3 hours of dual instruction, including at least 1 hour of cross-country navigation with at least one dual cross-country flight of at least 50 km (27 nautical miles), and 5 solo take-offs and 5 solo full-stop landings.

Different rules apply for helicopters and balloons. The night rating is a prerequisite for the issue of a Commercial Pilot Licence.

In Australia, the qualification is known as a "Night VFR rating", and requires 10 hours of flight time at night in an aircraft or simulator, including at least 5 hours of cross-country flight at night in an aircraft.

A night rating does not expire.

In the United States, there is no night rating. Night training is a prerequisite for the Private Pilot Licence. Sport pilots and recreational pilots may not fly at night.
