= Practical Test Standards =

Former FAA airman certification paradigm

Practical Test Standards or PTS are sets of guidelines, standards, and criteria formerly used in the United States by Federal Aviation Administration (FAA) Safety Inspectors or Designated Pilot Examiners to determine the suitability of airmen to be issued an airman certificate by conducting a checkride. Each certification level features unique criteria published by the FAA both electronically and in hard copy format. The system was partially superseded, beginning on June 15, 2016, by a new set of publications called Airman Certification Standards, though the PTS is still used for select FAA practical tests.

A list of the following common "Special Emphasis Areas" was shared by all certification levels:

1. Positive aircraft control;
2. Positive exchange of the flight controls procedure;
3. Stall/spin awareness;
4. Collision avoidance;
5. Wake turbulence avoidance;
6. LAHSO (Land and Hold Short Operations);
7. Runway incursion avoidance;
8. CFIT (Controlled Flight Into Terrain);
9. ADM (Aeronautical Decision Making) and risk management;
10. wire strike avoidance;
11. checklist usage;
12. Temporary Flight Restrictions (TFRs)
13. Special Use Airspace
14. Aviation Security
15. Single Pilot Resource Management (SRM)
16. Other areas deemed appropriate to any phase of the practical test.

== Airman Certification Standards ==
Beginning in 2011, the FAA began an effort to supersede the Practical Test Standards with the Airman Certification Standards. These would add "task-specific knowledge and risk management elements." This took effect for PAR and IRA in June 2016, with revisions (such as slow flight proficiency and testing of the initiation of a stall) and the addition of CAX in June 2017. The ACS not only replaced PTS but also combined or integrated the Knowledge Test Guide, Learning Statement Reference Guide, and Knowledge Exam Testing Matrix into a single standard. Several ratings, notably those for helicopter, and balloon, as well as flight instructor and aircraft mechanic certificates are still tested to the PTS.
