= Instrument rating in the United States =

FAA-issued qualification for flight under IFR regulations

An instrument rating is an authorization required for a pilot to fly under instrument flight rules (IFR). In the United States, the rating is issued by the Federal Aviation Administration.

== Instrument rating standards ==
To be eligible to pursue an Instrument Rating, the applicant must:

- Hold at least a Private Pilot Certificate.
- Be able to read, write, and converse fluently in English.
- Hold a current FAA Medical Certificate, unless the Practical Examination is administered, in its entirety, in an FAA-certified Level D Flight Training Device.
- Receive and log ground training from an authorized instructor (i.e. ground school course) or complete a home-study course using an instrument textbook and/or videos.

== Ground training ==
- Candidates for the instrument rating must be knowledgeable in IFR-related items in the AIM, the U.S. ATC system and procedures, IFR navigation, the use of IFR charts, aviation weather, requirements for operating under IFR conditions, recognition of critical weather, Aeronautical Decision Making (ADM) and Crew Resource Management (CRM).
- Candidates must also pass the FAA instrument rating knowledge test with a score of 70% or better.

== Flight experience and training ==
- Accumulate flight experience per FAR 61.65:
  - The candidate must have at least 50 hours of cross-country flight time as pilot in command, which can include solo cross-country time as a student pilot. Each cross-country must have a landing at an airport that is at least a straight-line distance of more than 50 NM from the original departure point.
  - The candidate must make at least one cross-country flight that is performed under IFR and transits a distance of at least 250 NM along airways or ATC-directed routing and includes an instrument approach at each airport so that a total of three different kinds of instrument approaches are performed.
  - The candidate also needs a total of 40 hours of actual or simulated instrument time, including a minimum of 15 hours of instrument flight training from a Flight Instructor certified to teach the instrument rating (CFII).
  - Up to 20 hours of the instrument training may be accomplished in an approved flight simulator or flight training device if the training was provided by an authorized instructor (CFI).
  - In the 2 calendar months prior to the practical test, the candidate needs to log 3 hours of instrument training in an airplane that is appropriate to the instrument-airplane rating from a CFII in preparation for the test.
  - Receive and log training, as well as obtain a logbook endorsement from your CFII on the following areas of operation: preflight preparation, preflight procedures, air traffic control clearances and procedures, flight by reference to instruments, navigation systems, instrument approach procedures, emergency operations, and postflight procedures.
- Successfully complete the instrument rating practical test (an oral and flight test), as specified in Practical Test Standards (PTS) for the instrument rating, which will be conducted by an FAA designated examiner.

== Operations requiring an instrument rating ==
A pilot must have an instrument rating in order to act as Pilot in Command of a flight below VFR weather minimums in controlled airspace (Class A, B, C, D, and E) and/or under IFR. The rating is also required:

- When flying an airplane under Special VFR at night (helicopters are excepted from the regulation).
- When a commercial pilot is flying an airplane carrying passengers for hire on flights in excess of 50 nautical miles (90 km) or at night.
- In Class A airspace, since all Class A operations must be conducted IFR.

== IFR currency requirement ==
Under FAR 61.57, to be eligible to fly in Instrument Meteorological Conditions (IMC) an IFR-rated pilot must accomplish and log at least the following IFR procedures under actual or simulated IMC every 6 months:

- 6 instrument approaches.
- Holding procedures.
- Intercepting and tracking courses through the use of navigation systems.

An Instrument Proficiency Check administered by a CFII, DPE or ASI within the last 6 months is another way of complying with the IFR currency requirement.

If a pilot is not current looking back 6 months, they may complete the listed requirements in a flight simulator aviation training device or in an aircraft under simulated instrument conditions with a qualified safety pilot onboard. If they are not current looking back 12 months, an instrument proficiency check is required.
