= Type rating =

Certification of an airplane pilot to fly a certain type of aircraft

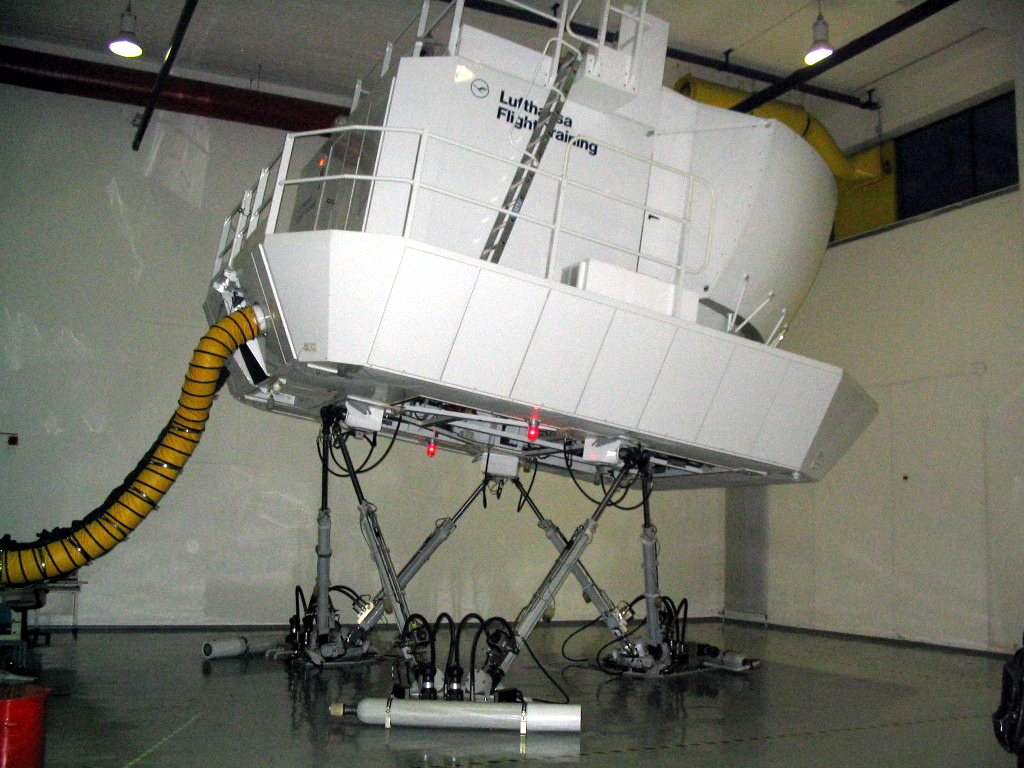
Full flight simulator training is a part of a pilot type rating certification

A type rating is an authorization entered on or associated with a pilot license and forming part thereof, stating the pilot's privileges or limitations pertaining to a certain aircraft type. Such qualification requires additional training beyond the scope of the initial license and aircraft class training.

== History ==
The 12,500 lb (5,700 kg) weight limit for a type rating in the United States was instituted in 1952 and was likely selected as it was half of the 25,000 lb (11,000 kg) gross takeoff weight of a DC-3. (Note: The 1952 pilot certification requirement was preceded by a temporary 1949 regulation exempting aircraft below the same weight limit from economic regulation.)

== International Regulation ==
The International Civil Aviation Organization (ICAO) specifies the international personnel licensing requirements, as documented in Annex 1 to the Convention on International Civil Aviation. Which aircraft require a type rating is decided by each country's civil aviation authority, in accordance with specifications outlined by ICAO.

ICAO stipulates that:

- Type Ratings should be established for aircraft with minimum crew of at least two pilots or when considered necessary by the Licensing Authority
- The applicant for a Type Rating must demonstrate the degree of skill required - including all normal flight procedures, emergency procedures, instrument procedures (where applicable) as well as upset prevention and recovery.

In the United States, all turbojets require a type rating. Aircraft with a maximum take-off weight of more than 12,500 pounds (5,700 kg) typically require a type rating. In many countries pilots of single-engine piston aircraft under a certain maximum weight (5,700 kg or 12,500 lb, typically) do not require a type rating for each model, all or most such aircraft being covered by one class rating instead. In New Zealand there are no class ratings, each aircraft model requires its own rating. Countries which have adopted the class rating system for small aircraft typically require additional training and license endorsement for complexity features such as conventional undercarriage (tailwheels), variable-pitch propellers, retractable undercarriage, etc.

Many commercial aircraft share type ratings, allowing qualified pilots to transition from one to another with differences training without the need to go through the full certification process. Examples include the Boeing 757 and Boeing 767, Boeing 777 and Boeing 787, the entire 737NG family, Airbus A330 and Airbus A350 and all of the members of the A320 family (the A318, A319, A320, and A321).

== Type Ratings in the United States ==
In order to remain compliant with ICAO Annex 1, the Federal Aviation Administration (FAA) in the United States requires co-pilots (second-in-command, or SIC) to have a 'SIC Type Rating' for aircraft requiring a crew of two, and otherwise requires a type rating to act as pilot-in-command (PIC) to fly internationally, or over international airspace. This is outlined in Code of Federal Regulations Title 14 §61.55 (14 CFR 61.55) and introduced in 2006. Such a type rating is not required for operations completely within the United States. An instrument rating is required for some type ratings.

In the United States some type ratings can be issued with a "visual flight rules (VFR) only" limitation when the type rating checkride was conducted without instrument flight rules (IFR) approaches or operations, but only VFR maneuvers and procedures. This is most typical in older aircraft (i.e. Ford Trimotor, N-B25, B17, etc.)

== Type Ratings in Canada ==
Canada follows US FAA and ICAO standards for fixed-wing type ratings. Unlike the US, Canada requires type ratings for all helicopter types, regardless of MTOW.

== Type Ratings for EASA states ==
European Aviation Safety Agency (EASA) publishes its ICAO type rating compliance and further regulations in Part-FCL - Flight Crew Licensing, Subpart H.

Although much of the training for a type rating can be carried out in a simulator, type ratings require some training in the relevant aircraft. However, a pilot with sufficient experience on one aircraft can undertake a type rating for a different aircraft as a "Zero Flight Time Training" (ZFTT) course. This is carried out entirely in a simulator, saving fuel and money.
