= FAA Practical Test =

Examination for airmen certification in the United States of America

A practical test (inf. "checkride") is the Federal Aviation Administration examination which an applicant must undergo in the United States to receive an airman certification, or a rating for additional privileges under the intended certificate. The test is conducted by an evaluator.

== Evaluating Document ==
A practical test is evaluated according to the guidelines published in the Airman Certification Standards (ACS), or the Practical Test Standards (PTS), as appropriate.

The following table lists which certifications/ratings are evaluated based on the guiding document:

Airman Certification Standards	Practical Test Standards
Sport Pilot; Instructor - Helicopter (simplified flight controls); Helicopter (simplified flight controls); Airline Transport Pilot and Type Ratings; Airplane; Powered-Lift; Commercial Pilot; Airplane; Rotorcraft Helicopter; Powered-Lift; Military Competence; Instrument Rating; Airplane; Helicopter; Private Pilot; Airplane; Rotorcraft Helicopter; Powered-Lift; Flight Instructor; Airplane; Rotorcraft Helicopter; Powered-Lift; Instrument Powered-Lift; Aviation Mechanic; General, Airframe, Powerplant; Remote Pilot	Recreational Pilot; Airplane; Rotorcraft; Flight Instructor; Rotorcraft Gyroplane; Glider; Instrument Airplane; Instrument Helicopter; Aircraft Dispatcher; Private Pilot; Rotorcraft Gyroplane; Lighter-Than-Air; Glider; Powered Parachute; Weight-Shift-Control; Commercial Pilot; Rotorcraft Gyroplane; Lighter-Than-Air; Glider; Airline Transport Pilot And Type Ratings; Rotorcraft Helicopter; Flight Engineer; Reciprocating Engine, Turbopropeller, and Turbojet Powered Aircraft; Parachute Rigger; Sport Pilot and Sport Pilot Instructor; Airplane; Gyroplane; Glider; Lighter-Than-Air

== Qualification ==
The regulations lists what the applicant needs to satisfy the requirements to take the practical test, both knowledge and skill, training and experience. If a knowledge test is necessary, the results must be provided to the evaluator prior to the practical test.

== The Test ==
The Practical Test consists of two parts: oral and skill. Each portion will be tested against the tolerances listed in the appropriate document for that exam.

=== Oral ===
The first portion of the practical test is the oral. The evaluator may ask questions for the applicant to answer, or may be in conversation format to allow situational based answers. If a knowledge test was required prior to conducting the practical test, as part of the questions asked, the evaluator will ask questions based on the missed answers on the knowledge test.

=== Skill ===
During the skill portion of the practical test, the evaluator will take on a role more like that of a passenger rather than an instructor. It is the evaluator's job to observe that the candidate demonstrates good decision-making skills, rather than teach or to act as a crew member, although the evaluator is likely to offer advice during the ride if inclined. The examiner usually does not touch any of the aircraft controls unless necessary to maintain the safety of the flight, in which case the candidate usually fails the examination instantly, except for the part when the evaluator acts as a safety pilot during operations with a view limiting device.

== Test Outcome ==
There are three possible outcomes for any practical test: Temporary Airman Certificate (satisfactory), Notice of Disapproval of Application (unsatisfactory), or Letter of Discontinuance.

=== Temporary Airman Certificate ===
If the evaluator finds that the applicant has satisfied the testing guidelines, the evaluator will submit the paperwork and print out the Temporary Airman Certificate, which will then be handed to the applicant. The applicant can exercise the privileges of the temporary airman certificate immediately until the earlier of 120 days or until the receipt of a permanent airman certificate.

=== Notice of Disapproval ===
If the evaluator finds the applicant has not satisfied the testing guidelines, the evaluator will issue a Notice of Disapproval.

If the unsatisfactory event happened during the oral portion, the test will not continue to the skill portion. If the unsatisfactory event happened during the skill portion, the evaluator has the discretion to end the test immediately or allow the applicant to complete the remaining objectives of the test and defer the unsatisfactory task to a re-test.

The applicant must then re-train with a qualifying instructor before re-taking the test. The evaluator will re-test the unsatisfactory and any uncompleted items. The evaluator has discretion to re-test items previously passed or determine the skill to be unsatisfactory, leading to another issuance of a Notice of Disapproval.

=== Letter of Discontinuance ===
If the applicant feels the need to pause the test due to any factor including weather, illness, or mechanical issues, etc., the applicant may elect to do so and postpone for another date and time. The evaluator will then issue a Letter of Discontinuance, which state the maneuvers completed so that only the maneuvers not completed will be evaluated for the postponed test.
