= Weight-shift control =

Type of aircraft flight control

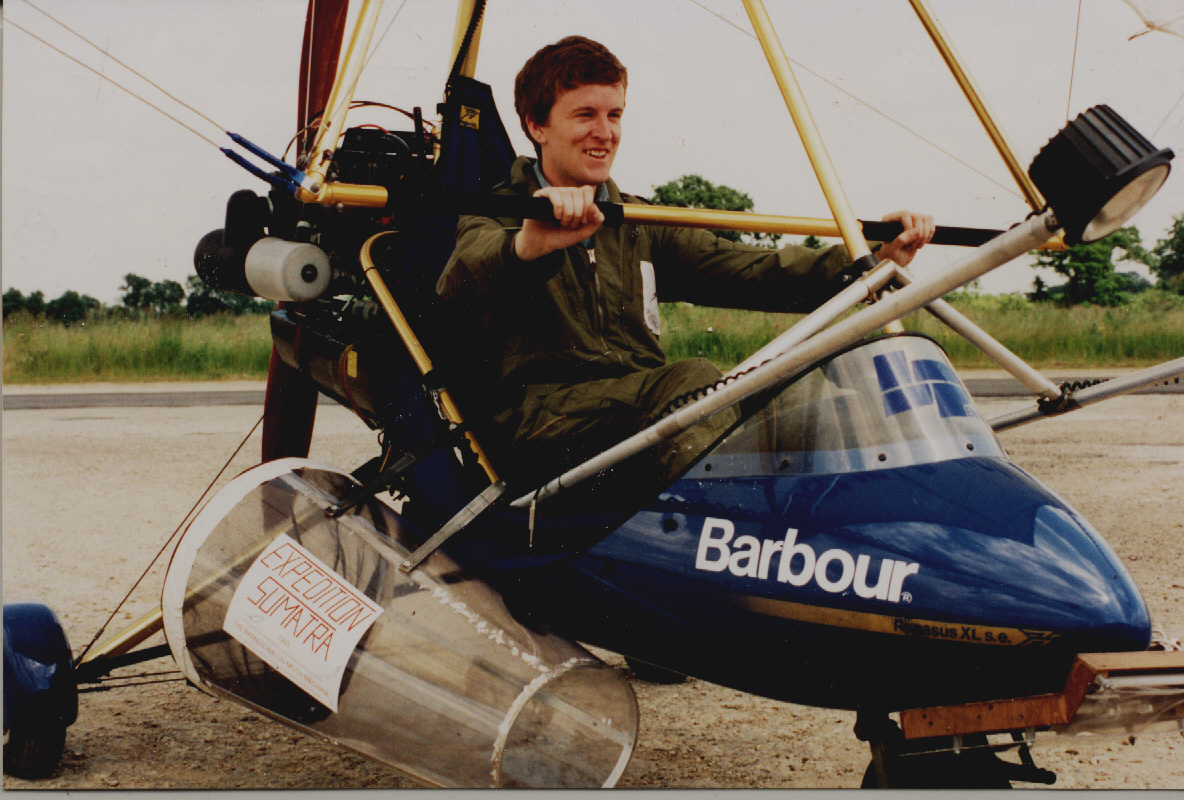
An ultralight trike showing the triangular control bar used in weight shift control

Weight-shift control as a means of aircraft flight control is widely used in hang gliders, powered hang gliders, and ultralight trikes. Control is usually by the pilot using their weight against a triangular control bar that is rigidly attached to the wing structure. The wing is mounted on a pivot above the trike carriage or hang glider harness allowing the weight-shift forces to produce changes in pitch and bank.

== See also ==
- Ultralight aircraft
