= Instrument rating =

Qualification to fly aircraft under IFR regulations

Instrument rating refers to the qualifications that a pilot must have in order to fly under instrument flight rules (IFR). It requires specific training and instruction beyond what is required for a private pilot certificate or commercial pilot certificate, including rules and procedures specific to instrument flying, additional instruction in meteorology, and more intensive training in flight solely by reference to instruments.

== Training and testing ==
Testing consists of a written exam and a practical test (also known as a check ride in the US, or a flight test in other countries). The check ride is divided into an oral component (certain countries only) to verify that the applicant understands the theory of instrument flying and an actual flight to ensure the pilot possesses the practical skills required for safe IFR flight.

For most private pilots, the most significant value of flying under IFR is the ability to fly in instrument meteorological conditions (such as inside clouds or days with poor visibility). Additionally, all flights operating in Class A airspace must be conducted under IFR. In the United States, an instrument rating is required when operating under special visual flight rules (SVFR) at night.

== Requirements ==
Requirements for an instrument rating in the United States are listed in section 61.65 of the Federal Aviation Regulation are:

- 50 hours of Pilot in Command cross country
- 40 hours of simulated or actual instrument time
- 15 hours of instrument training from an authorized flight instructor who holds an instrument-airplane rating, included within the 40 hours of required instrument time.

The Canadian license VFR-Over-the-Top (VFR OTT) allows private as well as commercial pilots to cross IMC areas when start and end of the trip is performed under VFR conditions.

In the UK, private pilots can attend a less intensive training to the Instrument Rating (Restricted) rating, restricted to the national airspace. This does not confer the privileges of a full Instrument Rating, but allows flight in IMC outside class A airspace, and flight on a SVFR clearance with in-flight visibility below 10 km (but more than 3 km).

An instrument rating test can be taken in either single or multi engine aircraft, with the qualification awarded being known as an SEIR or MEIR respectively. A pilot may be qualified to fly multi engine aircraft, but only hold a SEIR - in which case they would only be allowed to fly SE aircraft in IMC. To upgrade to a MEIR, further training and another check ride would be required. An MEIR holder is automatically granted SEIR privileges.

In addition, under EASA, an instrument rating is issued as either single pilot (SP) or multi pilot (MP) and must be re-validated separately every 12 months. Typically, a pilot will get their first SP MEIR on a light piston twin, then when they move to an airline, they will get an MP MEIR as part of their type rating training. If they do not re-validate their SP MEIR, they could find themselves in the position of being allowed to fly IFR in a jet but not a piston.

== See also ==
- Instrument rating in the United States
- Instrument rating in Canada
- Sensory illusions in aviation
- Spatial disorientation
- Bárány chair
- Terminal Aerodrome Forecast (TAF)
- METAR
- Jet stream
- Icing conditions
