= Dutch roll =

Aircraft motion combining rolling and yawing

An animated illustration of the two motions which combine into a Dutch roll

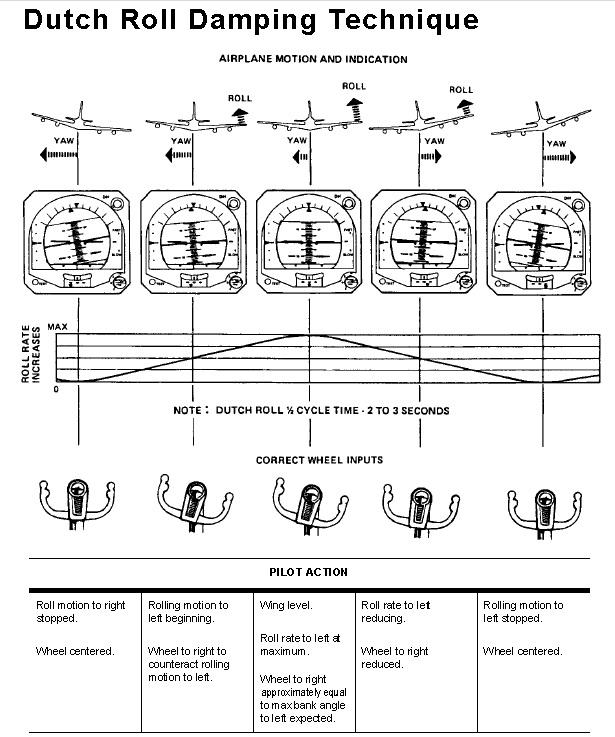
Dutch roll damping technique, scanned from U.S. Air Force flight manual

Dutch roll is an aircraft motion consisting of an out-of-phase combination of "tail-wagging" (yaw) and rocking from side to side (roll). This yaw-roll coupling is one of the basic flight dynamic modes (others include phugoid, short period, and spiral divergence). This mode resembles the motion of an aircraft that is simultaneously yawing and rolling from side to side. This motion is normally well damped in most light aircraft, though some aircraft with well-damped Dutch roll modes can experience a degradation in damping as airspeed decreases and altitude increases. Dutch roll stability can be artificially increased by the installation of a yaw damper. Wings placed well above the center of gravity, swept wings, and dihedral wings tend to increase the roll restoring force, and therefore increase the Dutch roll tendencies; this is why high-winged aircraft often are slightly anhedral, and transport-category swept-wing aircraft are equipped with yaw dampers. A similar phenomenon can happen in a trailer pulled by a car.

== Stability ==
In aircraft design, Dutch roll results from relatively weaker positive directional stability as opposed to positive lateral stability. When an aircraft rolls around the longitudinal axis, a sideslip is introduced into the relative wind in the direction of the rolling motion (due to the lateral component of lift when the wings are not level). Strong lateral stability (due to the more-direct airflow past the down wing, which has been pivoted forward by the slip) begins to restore the aircraft to level flight. At the same time, somewhat weaker directional stability (due both to greater drag from the wing which is now generating greater lift, and by aerodynamic force on the vertical fin due to the yaw) attempts to correct the sideslip by aligning the aircraft with the perceived relative wind. Since directional stability is weaker than lateral stability for the particular aircraft, the restoring yaw motion lags significantly behind the restoring roll motion. The aircraft passes through level flight as the yawing motion is continuing in the direction of the original roll. At that point, the sideslip is introduced in the opposite direction and the process is reversed.

There is a trade-off between directional and lateral stability. Greater lateral stability leads to greater spiral stability and lower oscillatory stability. Greater directional stability leads to spiral instability but greater oscillatory stability.

== Mechanism ==
The most common mechanism of Dutch roll occurrence is a yawing motion which can be caused by a number of factors. As a swept-wing aircraft yaws (to the right, for instance), the left wing becomes less-swept than the right wing in reference to the relative wind. Because of this, the left wing develops more lift than the right wing causing the aircraft to roll to the right. This motion continues until the yaw angle of the aircraft reaches the point where the vertical stabilizer effectively becomes a wind vane and reverses the yawing motion. As the aircraft yaws back to the left, the right wing then becomes less swept than the left resulting in the right wing developing more lift than the left. The aircraft then rolls to the left as the yaw angle again reaches the point where the aircraft wind-vanes back the other direction and the whole process repeats itself. The average duration of a Dutch roll half-cycle is 2 to 3 seconds.

The Dutch roll mode can be excited by any use of aileron or rudder, but for flight test purposes it is usually excited with a rudder singlet (a short sharp motion of the rudder to a specified angle, and then back to the centered position) or doublet (a pair of such motions in opposite directions). Some larger aircraft are better excited with aileron inputs. Periods can range from a few seconds for light aircraft to a minute or more for airliners.

Tex Johnston describes the Dutch roll as "...an inherent characteristic of swept-wing aircraft. It starts with a yaw. In a 35-degree swept-wing airplane, a yaw is accompanied by a simultaneous roll in the direction of yaw. The roll is caused by changing lift factors as the airflow path over the wing changes. For example, in a left yaw the left wing slews toward the rear so that airflow is displaced spanwise from its normal front-to-rear path over the airfoil section. That reduces lift. Simultaneously, the advancing right wing gets more chordwise flow, and so its lift is increased. In combination the two conditions create a left roll. Similarly, a yaw to the right results in a roll to the right. An oscillation is set up."

== Rolling on a heading ==
Dutch roll is also the name (considered by professionals to be a misnomer) given to a coordination maneuver generally taught to student pilots to improve their "stick-and-rudder" technique. The aircraft is alternately rolled as much as 60 degrees left and right while rudder is applied to keep the nose of the aircraft pointed at a fixed point. More correctly, this is a rudder coordination practice exercise, to teach a student pilot how to correct for the effect known as adverse aileron yaw during roll inputs.

This coordination technique is better referred to as "rolling on a heading", wherein the aircraft is rolled in such a way as to maintain an accurate heading without the nose moving from side-to-side (or yawing). The yaw motion is induced through the use of ailerons alone due to aileron drag, wherein the lifting wing (aileron down) is doing more work than the descending wing (aileron up) and therefore creates more drag, forcing the lifting wing back, yawing the aircraft toward it. This yawing effect produced by rolling motion is known as adverse yaw. This has to be countered precisely by application of rudder in the same direction as the aileron control (left stick, left rudder – right stick, right rudder). This is known as synchronised controls when done properly, and is difficult to learn and apply well. The correct amount of rudder to apply with aileron is different for each aircraft.

== Etymology ==
The origin of the name Dutch roll is uncertain. However, it is likely that this term, describing a lateral asymmetric motion of an airplane, was borrowed from a reference to similar-appearing motion in ice skating. As early as 1859, the ice skating motion was described:

Skating on the outer edge of the skate, leaning the body to the right or left as the right or left foot is used, and making a semi-circle outwardly from a center line, is one of the newest inventions in the art, as has been practised only within two or three years. It is sometimes called the "Dutch roll."

By 1916, only five years after George H. Bryan published the first mathematical analysis of lateral motion of aircraft, the term had been imported from skating to aeronautical engineering. Jerome C. Hunsaker wrote in his paper "Dynamical Stability of Aeroplanes":

Dutch Roll.—The third element in the [lateral] motion is a yawing to the right and left, combined with rolling. The motion is oscillatory of period from 5 to 12 seconds, which may or may not be damped. The analogy to 'Dutch Roll' or 'Outer Edge' in ice-skating is obvious.

== Notable incidents ==
- On October 19, 1959, on a Boeing 707 on customer-acceptance flight, the yaw damper was turned off to familiarize the new pilots with flying techniques. A trainee pilot's actions violently exacerbated the Dutch roll motion and caused three of the aircraft's four engines to be torn from its wings. The plane, a brand new 707-227, N7071, destined for Braniff, crash-landed on a river bed north of Seattle at Arlington, Washington, killing four of the eight occupants.
- On August 12, 1985, Japan Air Lines Flight 123, a Boeing 747SR, exhibited a Dutch roll in combination with phugoid cycles after losing all hydraulics following the loss of its vertical stabiliser due to an improperly-repaired rear pressure bulkhead rupturing from metal fatigue. It would ultimately crash in the deadliest single-aircraft accident in history.
- On March 6, 2005, Air Transat Flight 961, an Airbus A310, was involved in a Dutch roll incident following structural failure of the rudder at cruising altitude after departure from Juan Gualberto Gomez Airport, Varadero, Cuba. The aircraft returned to the airport with serious structural damage and one flight attendant slightly injured.
- On May 3, 2013, a McConnell AFB, KS (USAF) KC-135R, 63-8877, flown by a Fairchild AFB, Washington aircrew, broke up in flight about eleven minutes after taking off from Manas Air base in Kyrgyzstan, killing all three crew members. It was determined that a rudder power control unit malfunction led to a Dutch roll oscillatory instability. Not recognizing the Dutch roll, the crew used the rudder to stay on course, which exacerbated the instability, leading to an unrecoverable flight condition. The over-stressed tail section detached and the rest of the aircraft broke apart soon after. The aircraft was at cruise altitude about 200 kilometres (120 mi) west of Bishkek before it crashed in a mountainous area near the village of Chorgolu, close to the border between Kyrgyzstan and Kazakhstan.
- On October 30, 2015, a Leonardo-Finmeccanica-Helicopters Division (formerly AgustaWestland) AW609 prototype crashed in Italy killing its two pilots. The Italian ANSV established that Dutch roll during a high-speed test was the probable cause.
- On May 25, 2024, Southwest Flight 746, a Boeing 737 MAX 8, registration N8825Q, experienced a Dutch roll during a flight from Phoenix Sky Harbor International Airport to Oakland International Airport. Post-flight inspection revealed damage to the standby power control unit (PCU). There were no injuries among the 175 passengers and six crew members.

== See also ==
- Aircraft dynamic modes § Roll subsidence mode
- Aircraft flight dynamics § Lateral modes
- Dutch angle, a camera technique that places things in frame at an angle
