= Boeing 707 =

Four-engined single-aisle airliner family

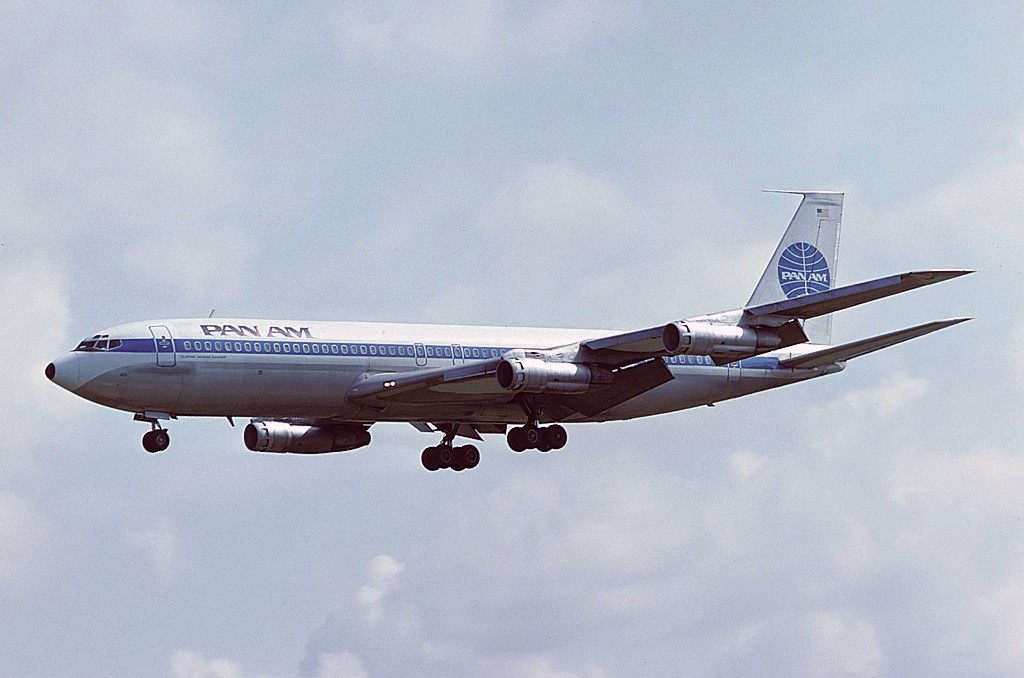
- Boeing 707-321B operated by Pan Am, 1979

General information
- Type: Narrow-body airliner
- National origin: United States
- Manufacturer: Boeing Commercial Airplanes
- Status: In military service (Note: Retired from airline passenger use in April 2013; civilian service ended in January 2019)
- Primary users: Pan Am (historical): Trans World Airlines (historical); American Airlines (historical); Air France (historical)
- Number built: 1,010 (including 154 Boeing 720s)

History
- Manufactured: 1956–1978 (Note: Commercial aircraft were produced from 1956 to 1978. See C-137, E-3, E-6, and E-8 articles for production of military derivatives.)
- Introduction date: October 26, 1958, with Pan Am
- First flight: December 20, 1957 (68 years ago)
- Developed from: Boeing 367-80
- Variants: Boeing 720; Boeing C-137 Stratoliner; Northrop Grumman E-8 Joint STARS; Boeing E-3 Sentry; Boeing E-6 Mercury

The Boeing 707 is an early American long-range narrow-body airliner, the first jetliner developed and produced by Boeing Commercial Airplanes. Developed from the Boeing 367-80 prototype, the initial 707-120 first flew on December 20, 1957. Pan Am, the launch customer, began regular service with the 707 on October 26, 1958. With versions produced until 1979, the 707 is a swept wing quadjet with podded engines. Its larger fuselage cross-section allowed six-abreast economy seating, retained in the later 720, 727, and 737 models.

Although it was not the first commercial jetliner in service, the 707 was the first to be widespread, and is often credited with beginning the Jet Age. It dominated passenger air-transport in the 1960s, and remained common through the 1970s, on domestic, transcontinental, and transatlantic flights, as well as cargo and military applications. It established Boeing as a dominant airliner manufacturer with its 7x7 series. The initial, 145-foot-long (44 m) 707-120 was powered by Pratt & Whitney JT3C turbojet engines. The shortened, long-range 707-138 and the more powerful 707-220 entered service in 1959. The longer-range, heavier 707-300/400 series has larger wings and is stretched slightly by 8 feet (2.4 m). Powered by Pratt & Whitney JT4A turbojets, the 707-320 entered service in 1959, and the 707-420 with Rolls-Royce Conway turbofans in 1960. Also in 1960, a lighter, short-range 707-020 was introduced; it was marketed as the Boeing 720.

Powered by quieter and more fuel-efficient Pratt & Whitney JT3D turbofans, the 707-120B debuted in 1961 and the 707-320B in 1962. The 707-120B typically flew 137 passengers in two classes over 3,600 nautical miles [nmi] (6,700 km; 4,100 mi), and could accommodate 174 in one class. With 141 passengers in two classes, the 707-320/420 could fly 3,750 nmi (6,940 km; 4,320 mi) and the 707-320B up to 5,000 nmi (9,300 km; 5,800 mi). The 707-320C convertible passenger-freighter model entered service in 1963, and passenger 707s have been converted to freighter configurations. Military derivatives include the E-3 Sentry airborne reconnaissance aircraft and the C-137 Stratoliner VIP transport. In total, 856 Boeing 707s and 154 Boeing 720s were produced and delivered.

== Development ==
=== Model 367-80 origins ===
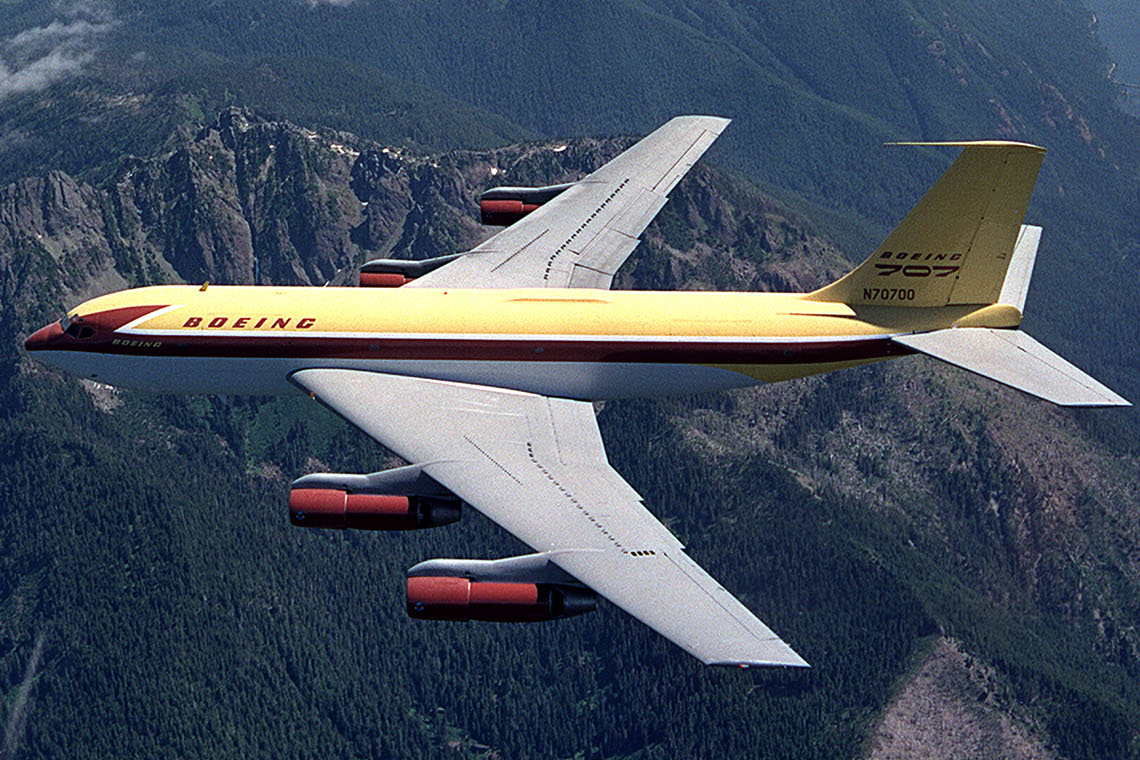
The 707 was based on the 367-80 "Dash 80"

During and after World War II, Boeing was known for its military aircraft. The company had produced innovative and important bombers, from the B-17 Flying Fortress and B-29 Superfortress to the jet-powered B-47 Stratojet and B-52 Stratofortress, but its commercial aircraft were not as successful as those from Douglas Aircraft and other competitors. As Douglas and Lockheed dominated the postwar air transport boom, the demand for Boeing's offering, the 377 Stratocruiser, quickly faded with only 56 examples sold and no new orders as the 1940s drew to a close. That venture had netted the company a $15 million loss. During 1949 and 1950, Boeing embarked on studies for a new jet transport and saw advantages with a design aimed at both military and civilian markets. Aerial refueling was becoming a standard technique for military aircraft, with over 800 KC-97 Stratofreighters on order. The KC-97 was not ideally suited for operations with the USAF's new fleets of jet-powered fighters and bombers; this was where Boeing's new design would win military orders.

As the first of a new generation of American passenger jets, Boeing wanted the aircraft's model number to emphasize the difference from its previous propeller-driven aircraft, which bore 300-series numbers. The 400-, 500- and 600-series were already used by its missiles and other products, so Boeing decided that the jets would bear 700-series numbers, and the first would be the 707. The marketing personnel at Boeing chose 707 because they thought it was more appealing than 700.

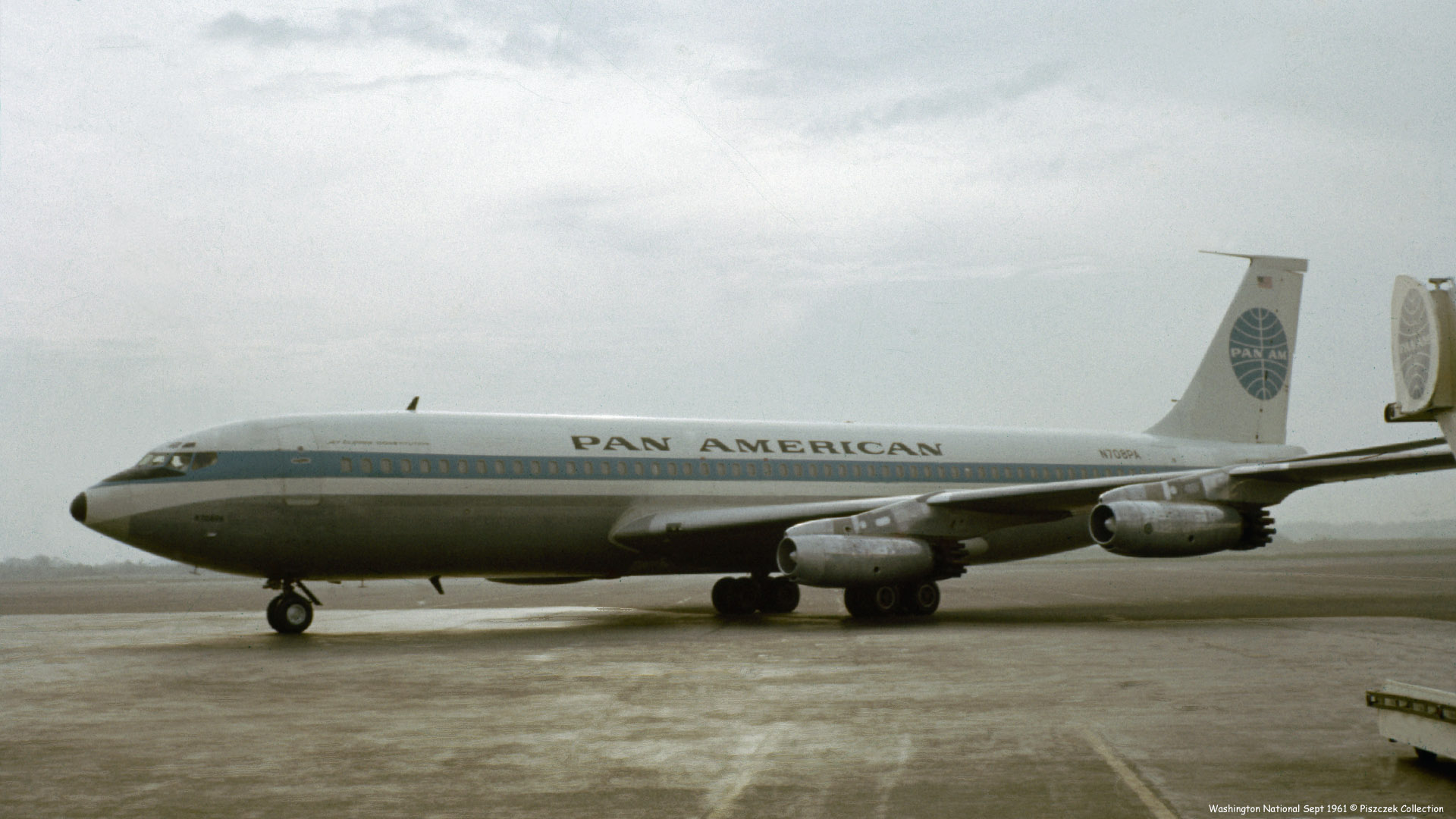
N708PA, the first Boeing 707 built (1957). This airplane would later crash as Pan Am Flight 292.

The project was enabled by the Pratt & Whitney JT3C turbojet engine, the civilian version of the J57 that yielded much more power than the previous generation of jet engines and was proving itself with the B-52. Freed from the design constraints imposed by limitations of late-1940s jet engines, developing a robust, safe, and high-capacity jet aircraft was within reach for Boeing. Boeing studied numerous wing and engine layouts for its new transport/tanker, some of which were based on the B-47 and C-97, before settling on the 367-80 "Dash 80" quadjet prototype aircraft. Less than two years elapsed from project launch in 1952 to rollout on May 14, 1954, with the first Dash 80 flying on July 15, 1954. The prototype was a proof-of-concept aircraft for both military and civilian use. The United States Air Force was the first customer, using it as the basis for the KC-135 Stratotanker aerial refueling and cargo aircraft.

Whether the passenger 707 would be profitable was far from certain. At the time, nearly all of Boeing's revenue came from military contracts. In a demonstration flight over Lake Washington outside Seattle, on August 7, 1955, test pilot Tex Johnston performed a barrel roll in the 367-80 prototype. Although he justified his unauthorized action to Bill Allen, then president of Boeing, as selling the airplane with a 1 'g' maneuver he was told not to do it again.

The 132 in (3,400 mm) wide fuselage of the Dash 80 was large enough for four-abreast (two-plus-two) seating like the Stratocruiser. Answering customers' demands and under Douglas competition, Boeing soon realized this would not provide a viable payload, so it widened the fuselage to 144 in (3,660 mm) to allow five-abreast seating and use of the KC-135's tooling. Douglas Aircraft had launched its DC-8 with a fuselage width of 147 in (3,730 mm). The airlines liked the extra space and six-abreast seating, so Boeing increased the 707's width again to compete, this time to 148 in (3,760 mm).

=== Production and testing ===
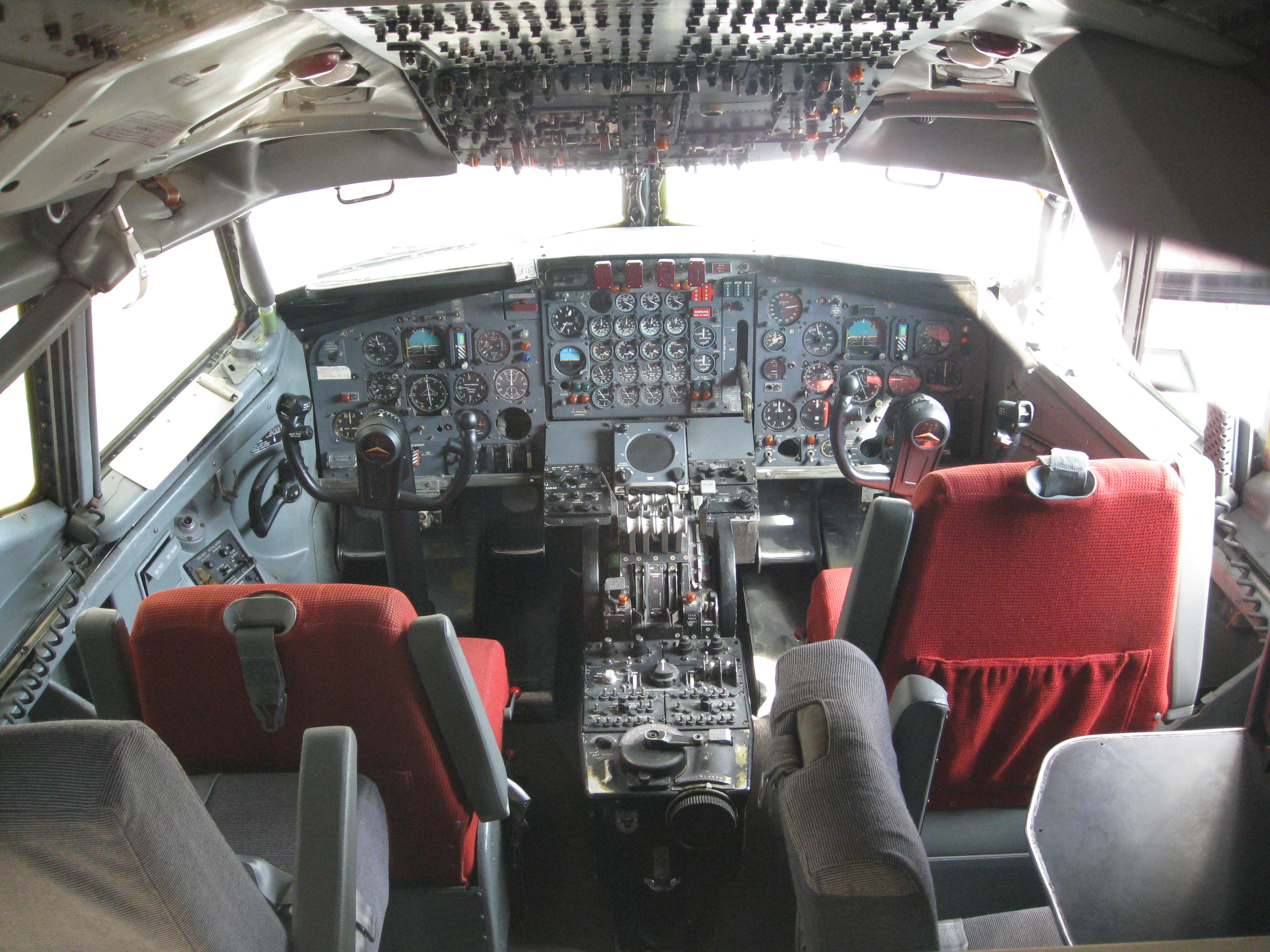
Boeing 707 cockpit

The first flight of the first-production 707-120 took place on December 20, 1957, and FAA certification followed on September 18, 1958. Both test pilots Joseph John "Tym" Tymczyszyn and James R. Gannett were awarded the first Iven C. Kincheloe Award for the test flights that led to certification. A number of changes were incorporated into the production models from the prototype. A Krueger flap was installed along the leading edge between the inner and outer engines on early 707-120 and -320 models. This was in response to de Havilland Comet overrun accidents which occurred after over-rotating on take-off. Wing stall would also occur on the 707 with over-rotation so the leading-edge flaps were added to prevent stalling even with the tail dragging on the runway.

=== Further developments ===
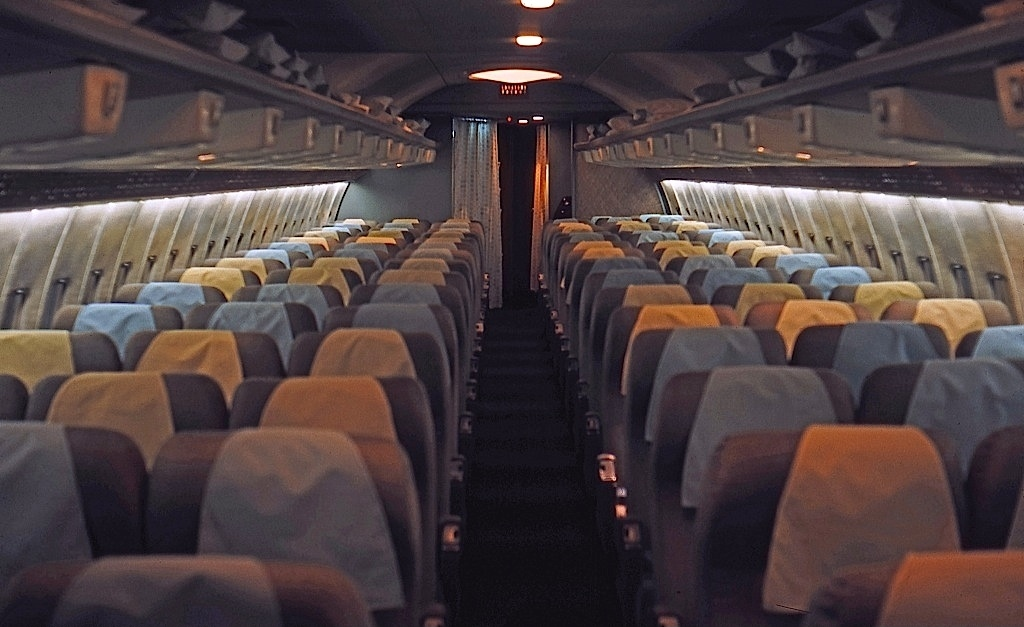
Boeing 707 six-abreast cabin

The initial standard model was the 707-120 with JT3C turbojet engines. Qantas ordered a shorter-bodied version called the 707-138, which was a -120 with six fuselage frames removed, three in front of the wings, and three aft. The frames in the 707 were set 20 in (510 mm) apart, so this resulted in a shortening of 10 ft (3.0 m) to a length of 134 ft 6 in (41.0 m). With the maximum takeoff weight the same as that of the -120 (247,000 lb (112 t)), the -138 was able to fly the longer routes that Qantas needed. Braniff International Airways ordered the higher-thrust version with Pratt & Whitney JT4A engines, the 707-220. The final major derivative was the 707-320, which featured an extended-span wing and JT4A engines, while the 707-420 was the same as the -320, but with Conway turbofan engines.

Though initially fitted with turbojet engines, the dominant engine for the Boeing 707 family was the Pratt & Whitney JT3D, a turbofan variant of the JT3C with lower fuel consumption and higher thrust. JT3D-engined 707s and 720s were denoted with a "B" suffix. While many 707-120Bs and -720Bs were conversions of existing JT3C-powered machines, 707-320Bs were available only as newly built aircraft, as they had a stronger structure to support a maximum takeoff weight increased by 19,000 lb (8,600 kg), along with modifications to the wing. The 707-320B series enabled nonstop westbound flights from Europe to the West Coast of the United States and from the US to Japan.

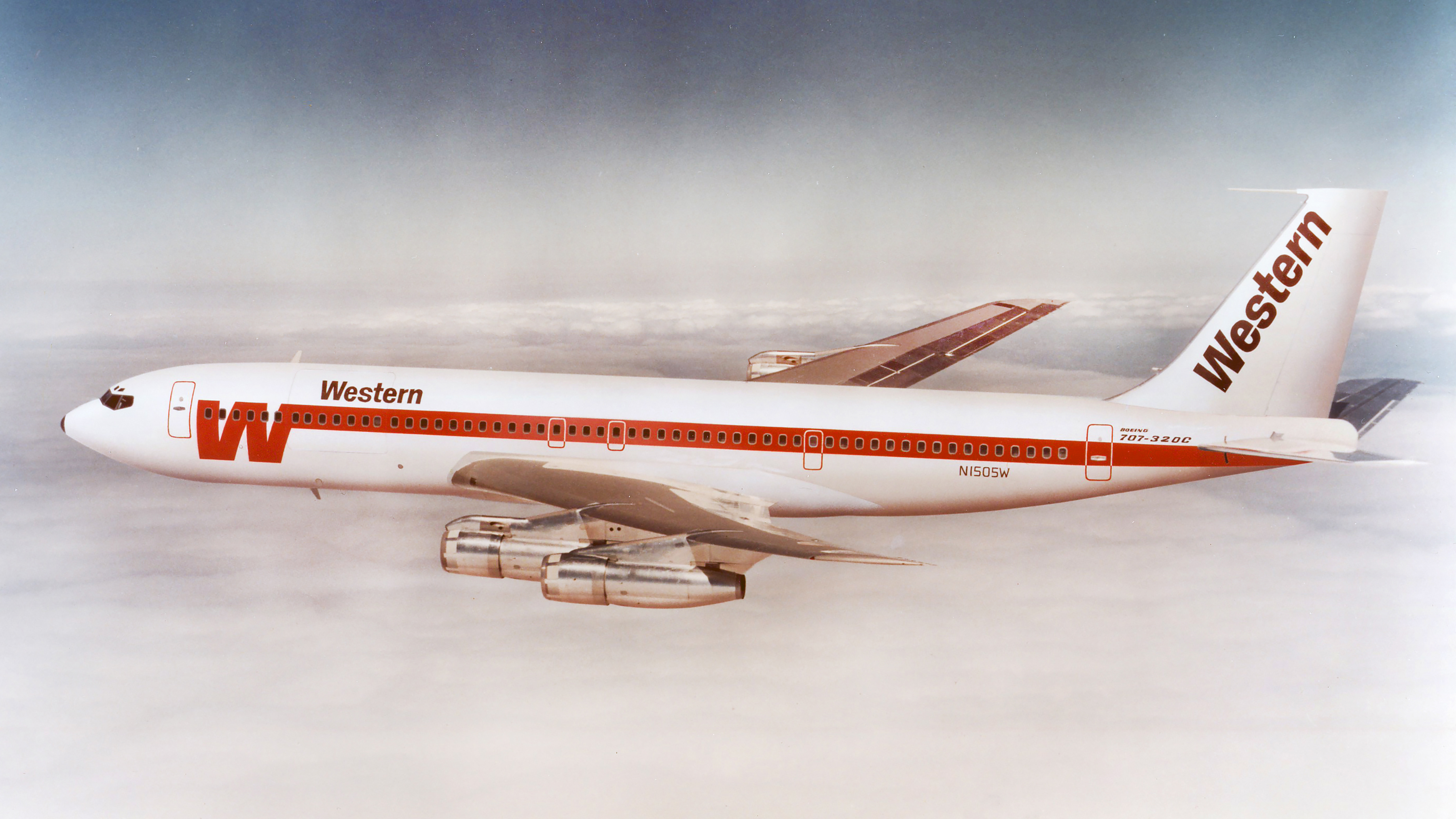
The -320 and -420 are 8 ft (2.4 m) longer than the initial -120; later 707s were powered by JT3D turbofans.

The final 707 variant was the 707-320C, (C for "Convertible"), which had a large fuselage door for cargo. It had a revised wing with three-sectioned leading-edge flaps, improving takeoff and landing performance and allowing the ventral fin to be removed (although the taller fin was retained). The 707-320Bs built after 1963 used the same wing as the -320C and were known as 707-320B Advanced aircraft.

In total, 1,010 707s were built for civilian use between 1958 and 1978, though many of these found their way to military service. The 707 production line remained open for purpose-built military variants until 1991, with the last new-build 707 airframes built as E-3 and E-6 aircraft.

Traces of the 707 are still found in the 737, which uses a modified version of the 707's fuselage, as well as the same external nose and cockpit configurations as those of the 707. These were also used on the previous 727, while the 757 also used the 707 fuselage cross-section.

== Design ==
=== Wings ===
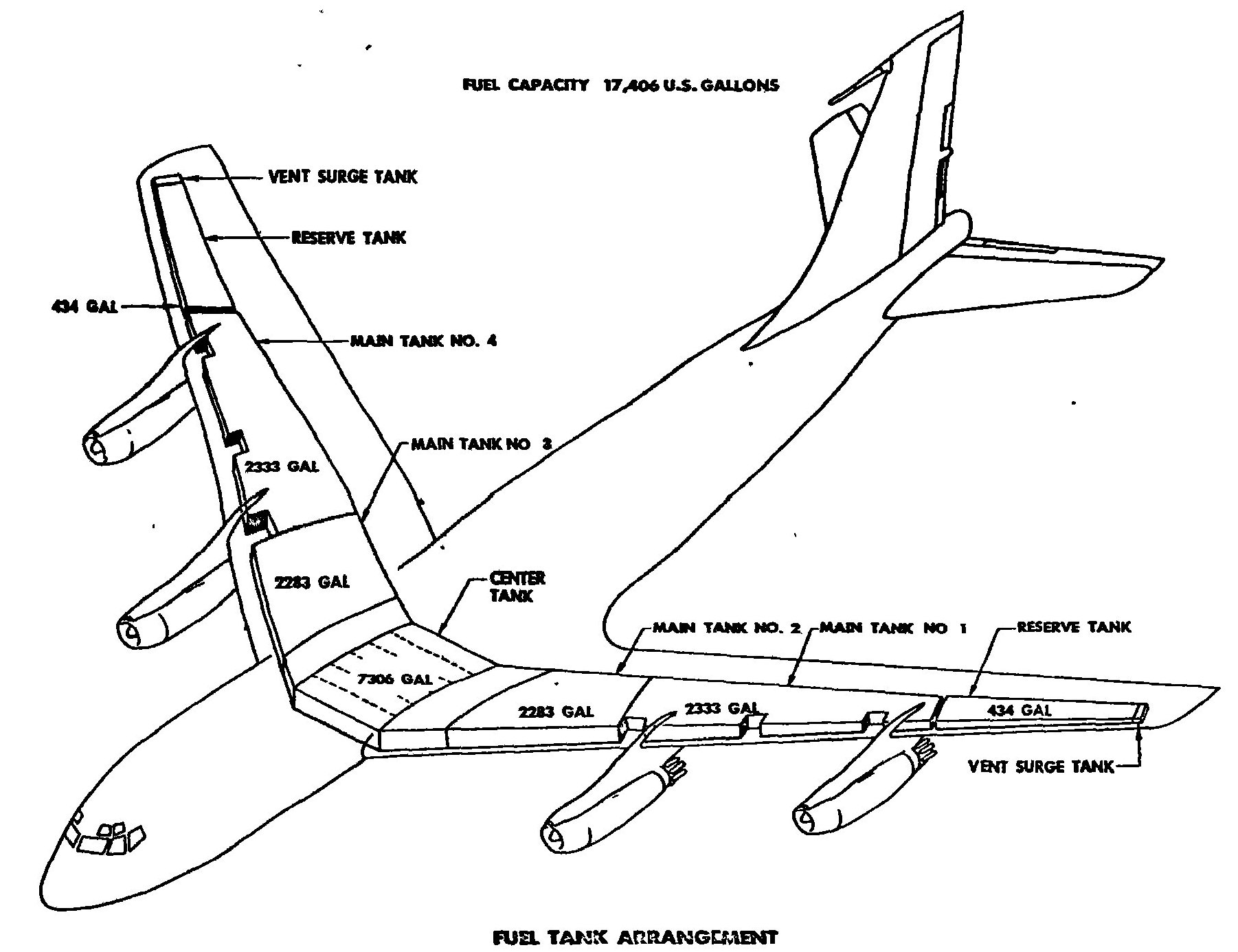
The 35° swept wing includes the fuel tanks

The 707's wings are swept back at 35°, and like all swept-wing aircraft, display an undesirable "Dutch roll" flying characteristic that manifests itself as an alternating combined yawing and rolling motion. Boeing already had considerable experience with this on the B-47 and B-52, and had developed the yaw damper system on the B-47 that would be applied to later swept-wing configurations like the 707. However, many pilots new to the 707 had no experience with this instability as they were mostly accustomed to flying straight-wing propeller-driven aircraft such as the Douglas DC-7 and Lockheed Constellation.

On one customer-acceptance flight, where the yaw damper was turned off to familiarize the new pilots with flying techniques, a trainee pilot's actions violently exacerbated the Dutch roll motion and caused three of the four engines to be torn from the wings. The plane, a brand new 707-227, N7071, destined for Braniff, crash-landed on a river bed north of Seattle at Arlington, Washington, killing four of the eight occupants.

In his autobiography, test pilot Tex Johnston describes a Dutch roll incident he experienced as a passenger on an early commercial 707 flight. As the aircraft's movements did not cease and most of the passengers became ill, he suspected a misrigging of the directional autopilot (yaw damper). He went to the cockpit and found the crew unable to understand and resolve the situation. He introduced himself and relieved the ashen-faced captain who immediately left the cockpit feeling ill. Johnston disconnected the faulty autopilot and manually stabilized the plane "with two slight control movements".

Johnston recommended Boeing increase the height of the tail fin, add a boosted rudder as well as add a ventral fin. These modifications were aimed at mitigating Dutch roll by providing more directional stability in yaw.

=== Engines ===
The initial 145-foot-long (44 m) 707-120 was powered by Pratt & Whitney JT3C turbojet engines.

The JT3D-3B engines are readily identifiable by the large gray secondary-air inlet doors in the nose cowl. These doors are fully open (sucked in at the rear) during takeoff to provide additional air. The doors automatically close with increasing airspeed.

The 707 was the first commercial jet aircraft to be fitted with clamshell-type thrust reversers.

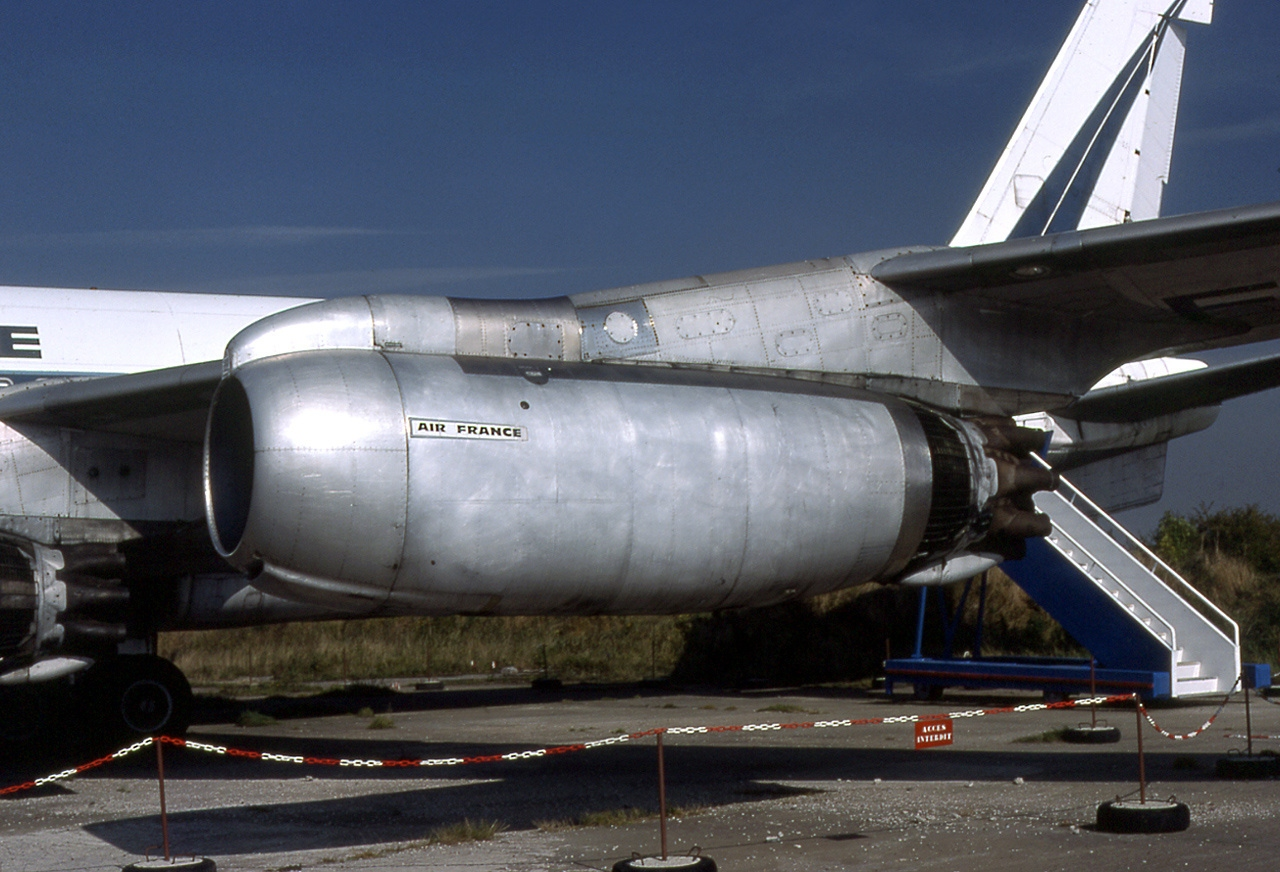
An early JT4A turbojet

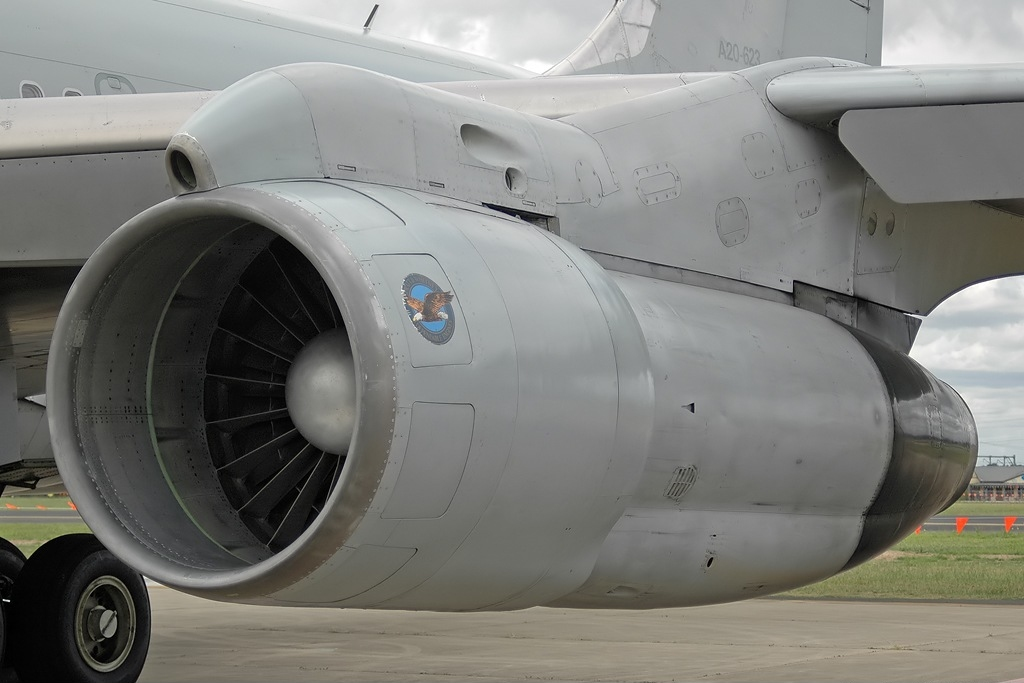
A later JT3D low-bypass turbofan

==== Turbocompressors ====
The 707 uses engine-driven turbocompressors to supply compressed air for cabin pressurization. On many commercial 707s, the outer port (number 1) engine mount is distinctly different from the other three, as this engine is not fitted with a turbocompressor. Later-model 707s typically had this configuration, although American Airlines had turbocompressors on engines 2 and 3 only. Early 707 models often had turbocompressor fairings on all four engines, but with only two or three compressors installed.

==== Upgraded engines ====
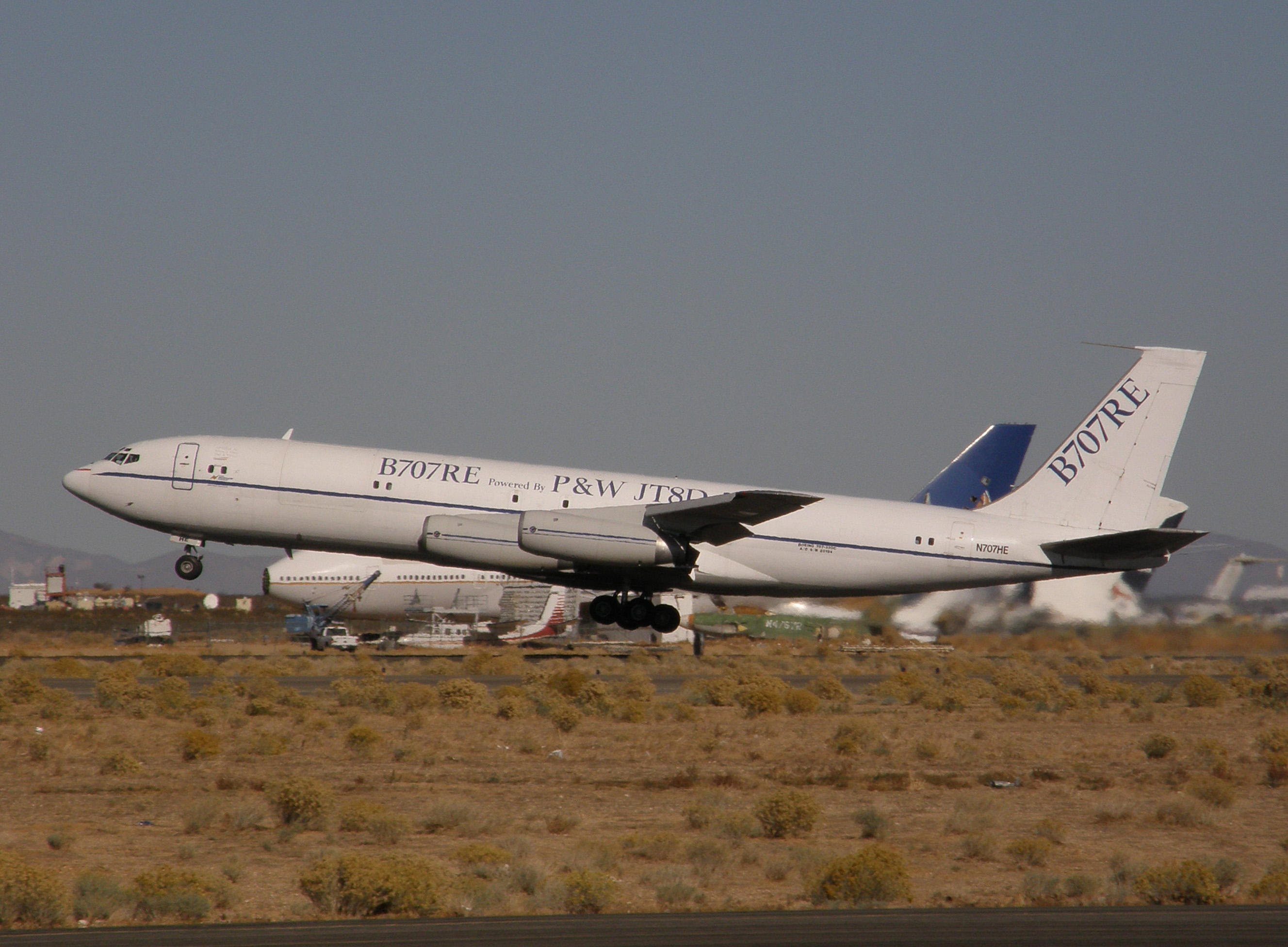
Omega Air's 707-330C testbed for the 707RE program takes off from the Mojave Airport, 2007

Pratt & Whitney, in a joint venture with Seven Q Seven (SQS) and Omega Air, selected the JT8D-219 low-bypass turbofan as a replacement powerplant for Boeing 707-based aircraft, calling their modified configuration a 707RE. Northrop Grumman selected the -219 to re-engine the US Air Force's fleet of 19 E-8 Joint STARS aircraft, which would allow the J-STARS more time on station due to the engine's greater fuel efficiency. NATO also planned to re-engine their fleet of E-3 Sentry AWACS aircraft. The -219 is publicized as being half the cost of the competing powerplant, the CFM International CFM56, and is 40 dB quieter than the original JT3D engines.

== Operational history ==
1959 Boeing 707 featurette by Pan American Airways

The first commercial orders for the 707 came on October 13, 1955, when leading global carrier Pan Am committed to 20 Boeing 707s, and 25 Douglas DC-8s, dramatically increasing their passenger capacity (in available revenue passenger seat-miles per hour/per day) over its existing fleet of propeller aircraft. The competition between the 707 and DC-8 was fierce. Pan Am ordered these planes when and as they did so that they would be the operators of the "first-off" production line for each aircraft type. Once the initial batch of the aircraft had been delivered to them and put into operation, Pan Am would have the distinction of being not only the "Launch Customer" for both transcontinental American jets, but the exclusive operator of American intercontinental jet transports for at least a year.

Passenger cabin of a Pan Am-operated Boeing 707-120, 1959

The only rival in intercontinental jet aircraft production at the time was the British de Havilland Comet. However, the Comet series had been the subject of fatal accidents (due to design flaws) early in its introduction and withdrawn from service; virtually redesigned from scratch, it was still smaller and slower than the 707 when reintroduced as version -4. In addition, airlines and their passengers at the time preferred the more established Douglas Aircraft as a maker of passenger aircraft, and several major carriers committed only to the Douglas DC-8, delayed by Douglas' decision to wait for the larger and more fuel efficient (Pratt & Whitney JT4A) turbojet to design a larger and longer range aircraft around. Anticipating this advantage, Boeing made a late and costly decision to redesign and enlarge the initial 707's wing to help increase range and payload, giving birth to the 707-320.

Boeing 707-120 galley, 1959.

Pan Am inaugurated 707 service with a christening at National Airport on October 17, 1958, attended by President Eisenhower, followed by a transatlantic flight for VIPs (personal guests of founder Juan Trippe) from Baltimore's Friendship International Airport to Paris. The aircraft's first commercial passenger flight was from Idlewild Airport, New York, to Le Bourget, Paris, on October 26, 1958, with a fuel stop in Gander, Newfoundland. In December National Airlines made the first US domestic jet airline flights between New York/Idlewild and Miami, using 707s leased from Pan Am.

Cabin window view from aboard Boeing 707-120, displaying leftmost dual JT4A engines

In February 1956, rival global giant Trans World Airlines' then-President Howard Hughes ordered eight Boeing 707-120, launching its first jet service, between New York-Idlewild International Airport and San Francisco International Airport in March 1959.

American Airlines was the first domestic airline to fly its own jets, on January 25, 1959. TWA started domestic 707-131 flights in March and Continental Airlines started 707-124 flights in June; airlines that had ordered only the DC-8, such as United, Delta, and Eastern, were left without jets until September and lost market share on transcontinental flights. Qantas was the first non-US airline to use the 707s, starting in 1959.

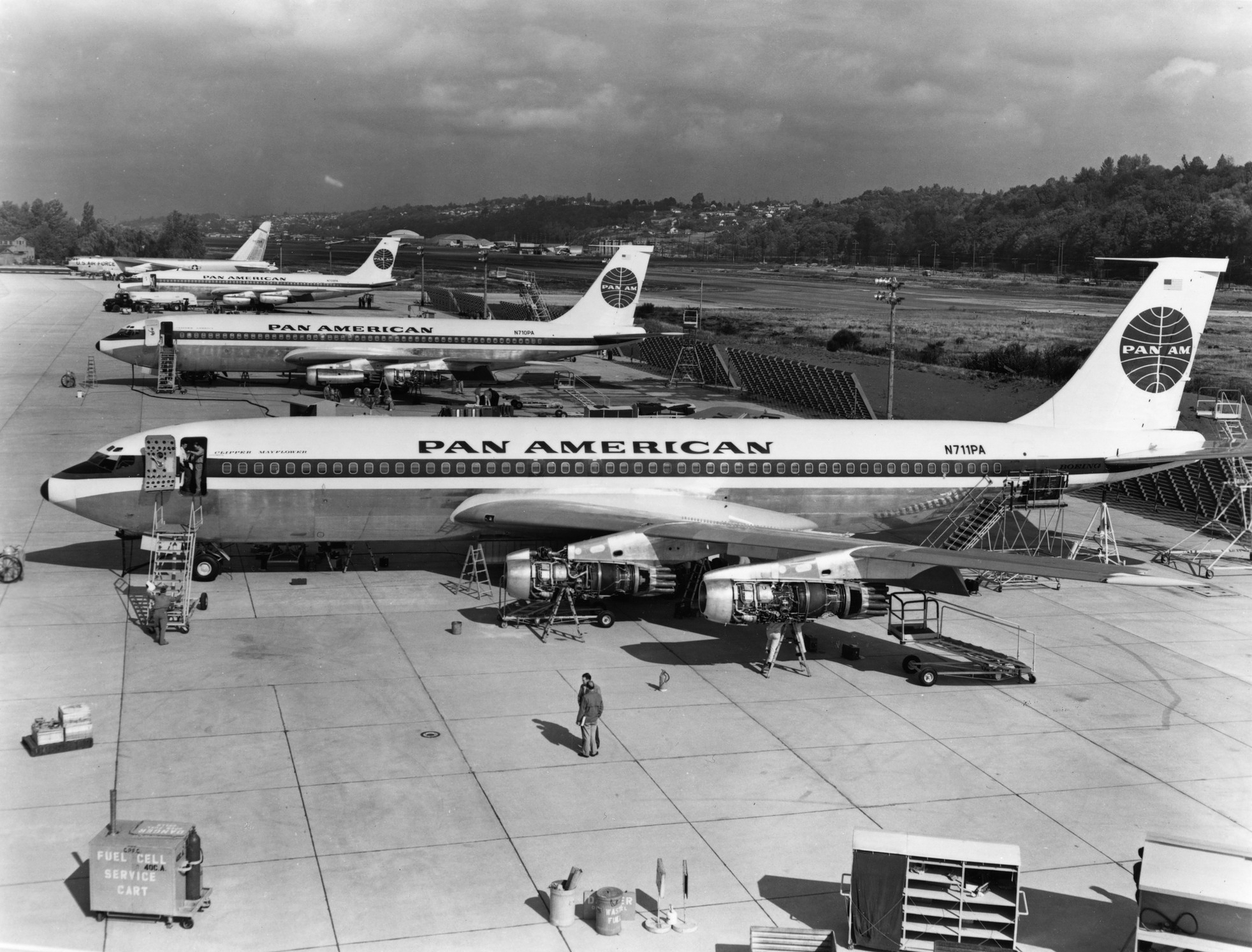
Pan Am introduced the 707-120 on October 26, 1958.

The 707 quickly became the most popular jetliner of its time. Its success led to rapid developments in airport terminals, runways, airline catering, baggage handling, reservations systems, and other air transport infrastructure. The advent of the 707 also led to the upgrading of air traffic control systems to prevent interference with military jet operations.

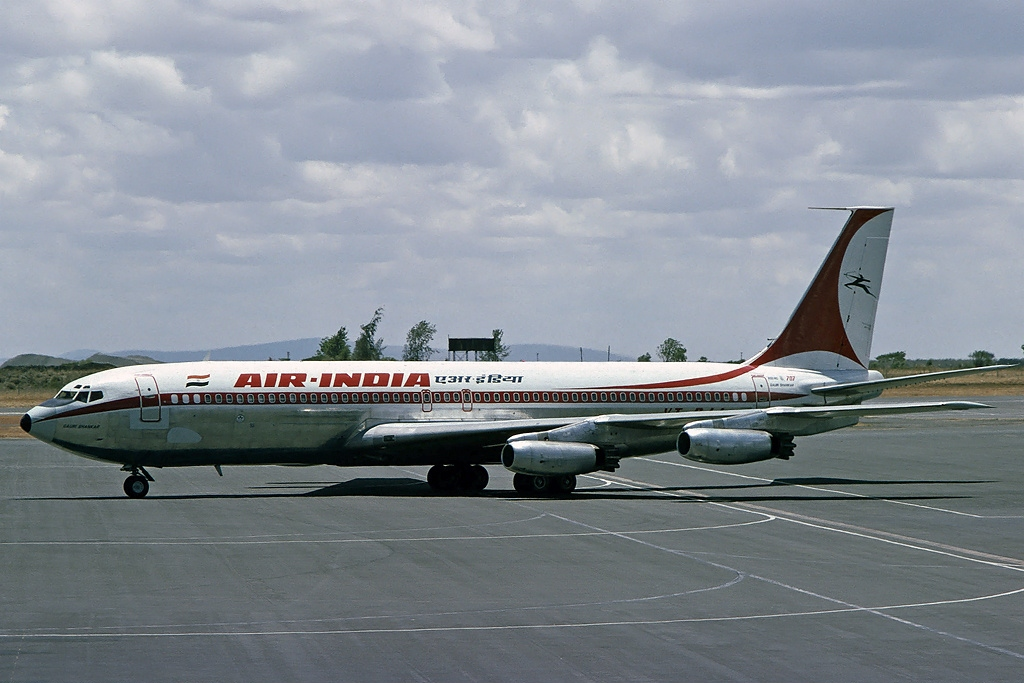
Air India became the first Asian carrier to induct a jet aircraft with the Boeing 707–420 Gauri Shankar (registered VT-DJJ).

As the 1960s drew to a close, the exponential growth in air travel led to the 707 being a victim of its own success. The 707 had become too small to handle the increased numbers of passengers on the routes for which it had been designed. Stretching the fuselage again was not a viable option because the installation of larger, more powerful engines would need a larger undercarriage, which was not feasible given the design's limited ground clearance at takeoff. Rather than stretch the fuselage, which would have also required pilot retraining, Boeing's answer to the problem was the first wide-body airliner—the Boeing 747. The 707's first-generation engine technology was also rapidly becoming obsolete in the areas of noise and fuel economy, especially after the 1973 oil crisis.

Operations of the 707 were threatened by the enactment of international noise regulations in 1985. Shannon Engineering of Seattle developed a hush kit with funding from Tracor, Inc, of Austin, Texas. By the late 1980s, 172 Boeing 707s had been equipped with the Quiet 707 package. Boeing acknowledged that more 707s were in service than before the hush kit was available.

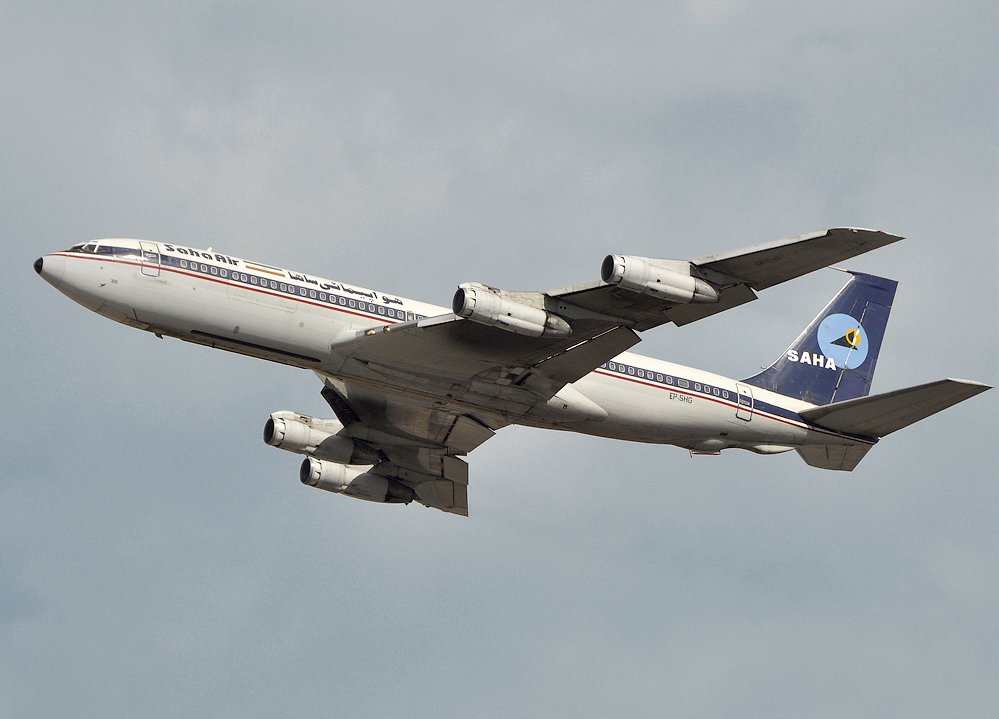
Iranian Saha Airlines was the last commercial operator, until April 2013

Trans World Airlines flew the last scheduled 707 flight for passengers by a US carrier on October 30, 1983, although 707s remained in scheduled service by airlines from other nations for much longer. Middle East Airlines of Lebanon flew 707s and 720s in front-line passenger service until the end of the 1990s. Since LADE of Argentina removed its 707-320Bs from regular service in 2007, Saha Airlines of Iran was the last commercial operator of the Boeing 707. After suspending its scheduled passenger service in April 2013, Saha continued to operate a small fleet of 707s on behalf of the Iranian Air Force.

As of 2019, only a handful of 707s remain in operation, acting as military aircraft for aerial refueling, transport, and AWACS missions.

== Variants ==
Although certified as Series 100s, 200s, 300s, etc., the different 707 variants are more commonly known as Series 120s, 220s, 320s, and so on, where the "20" part of the designation is Boeing's "customer number" for its development aircraft.

=== 707-020 ===
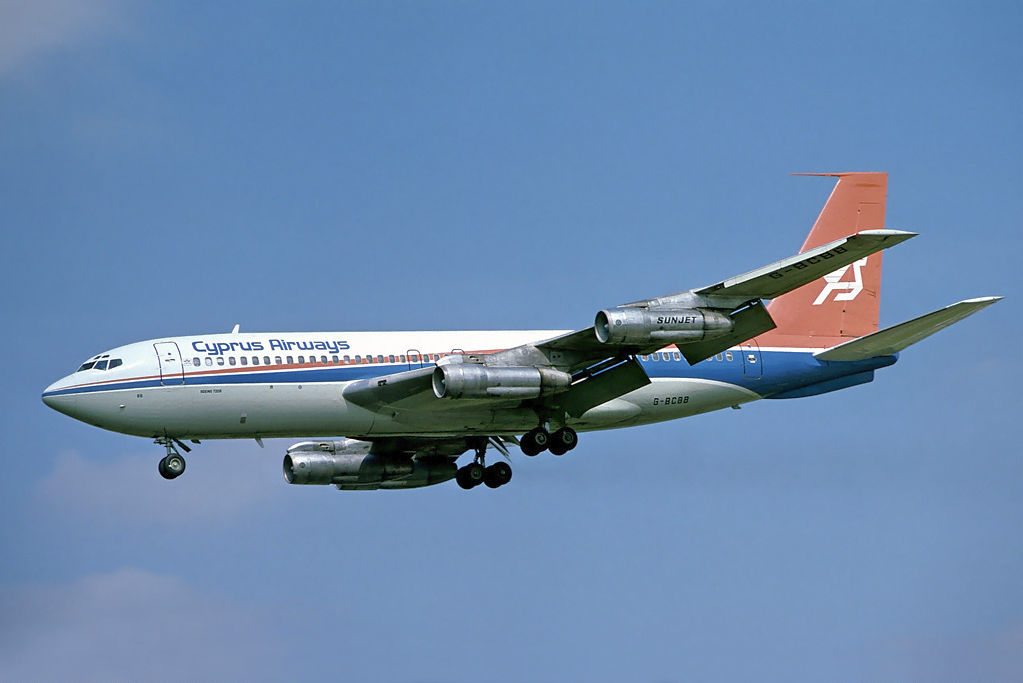
The 707-020 (720) is 9 ft (2.7 m) shorter than the 707-120.

Announced in July 1957 as a derivative for shorter flights from shorter runways, the 707-020 first flew on November 23, 1959. Its type certificate was issued on June 30, 1960, and it entered service with United Airlines on July 5, 1960. As a derivative, the 720 had low development costs, allowing profitability despite few sales.

Compared to the 707-120, it has a length reduced by 9 feet (2.7 m), a modified wing and a lightened airframe for a lower maximum takeoff weight. Powered by four Pratt & Whitney JT3C turbojets, the initial 720 could cover a 2,800 nmi (5,200 km; 3,200 mi) range with 131 passengers in two classes. Powered by JT3D turbofans, the 720B first flew on October 6, 1960, and entered service in March 1961. It could seat 156 passengers in one class over a 3,200 nmi (5,900 km; 3,700 mi) range. A total of 154 Boeing 720s and 720Bs were built until 1967. Some 720s were later converted to the 720B specification. The 720 was succeeded by the Boeing 727 trijet.

=== 707-120 ===
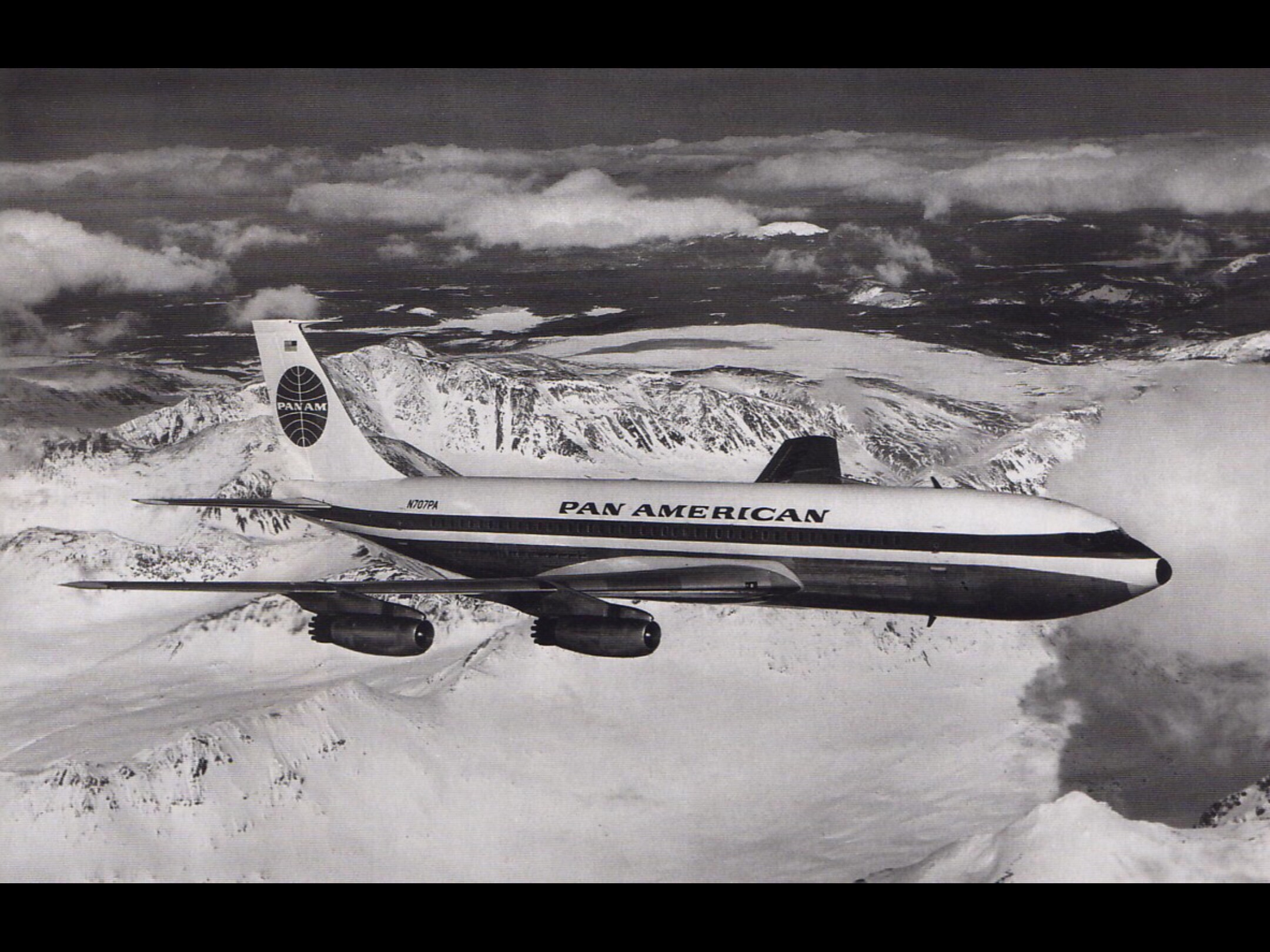
Boeing 707-120, the aircraft's first production variant

The 707-120 was the first production 707 variant, with a longer, wider fuselage, and greater wingspan than the Dash 80. The cabin had a full set of rectangular windows and could seat up to 189 passengers. It was designed for transcontinental routes, and often required a refueling stop when flying across the North Atlantic. It had four Pratt & Whitney JT3C-6 turbojets, civilian versions of the military J57, initially producing 13,000 lbf (57.8 kN) with water injection. Maximum takeoff weight was 247,000 lb (112,000 kg) and first flight was on December 20, 1957. Major orders were the launch order for 20 707-121 aircraft by Pan Am and an American Airlines order for 30 707-123 aircraft. The first revenue flight was on October 26, 1958; 56 were built, plus seven short-bodied -138s; the last -120 was delivered to Western in May 1960.

=== 707-138 ===
The 707-138 featured a -120 fuselage, from which 5 ft (1.5 m) (three frames) were removed both ahead of and behind the wing, increasing range. The maximum takeoff weight remained the same as the standard version, at 247,000 lb (112,000 kg). The variant was produced for Qantas and included their customer number, 38, in its designation. To allow for full-load takeoffs at the midflight refueling stop in Fiji, the wing's leading-edge slats were modified for increased lift, and the allowable temperature range for use of full takeoff power was increased by 10 °F (5.5 °C). Seven -138s were delivered to Qantas between June and September 1959, and they first carried passengers in July of that year.

=== 707-120B ===
The 707-120B had Pratt & Whitney JT3D-1 turbofan engines, which were quieter, more powerful, and more fuel-efficient, rated at 17,000 lbf (75.6 kN), with the later JT3D-3 version giving 18,000 lbf (80 kN). (This thrust did not require water injection, eliminating both the system and 5000–6000 lb of water.) The -120B had the wing modifications introduced on the 720 and a longer tailplane; a total of 72 were built, 31 for American and 41 for TWA, plus six short-bodied -138Bs for Qantas. American had its 23 surviving -123s converted to -123Bs, but TWA did not convert its 15 -131s. The only other conversions were Pan Am's five surviving -121s and one surviving -139, the three aircraft delivered to the USAF as -153s and the seven short-bodied Qantas -138s (making 13 total 707s delivered to Qantas between 1959 and 1964). The first flight of the -120B was on June 22, 1960, and American carried the first passengers in March 1961; the last delivery was to American in April 1969. Maximum weight was 258,000 lb (117,000 kg) for both the long- and short-bodied versions.

=== 707-220 ===
The 707-220 was designed for hot and high operations with the fuselage of the -120 and the more powerful 15,800 lbf (70.3 kN) Pratt & Whitney JT4A-3 turbojets that were first used by the -320. Five of these were produced, but only four were ultimately delivered, with one being lost during a test flight. All of these aircraft were built for Braniff International Airways and carried the model number 707-227; the first entered service in December 1959. This version was made obsolete by the arrival of the turbofan-powered 707-120B.

=== 707-320 Intercontinental ===
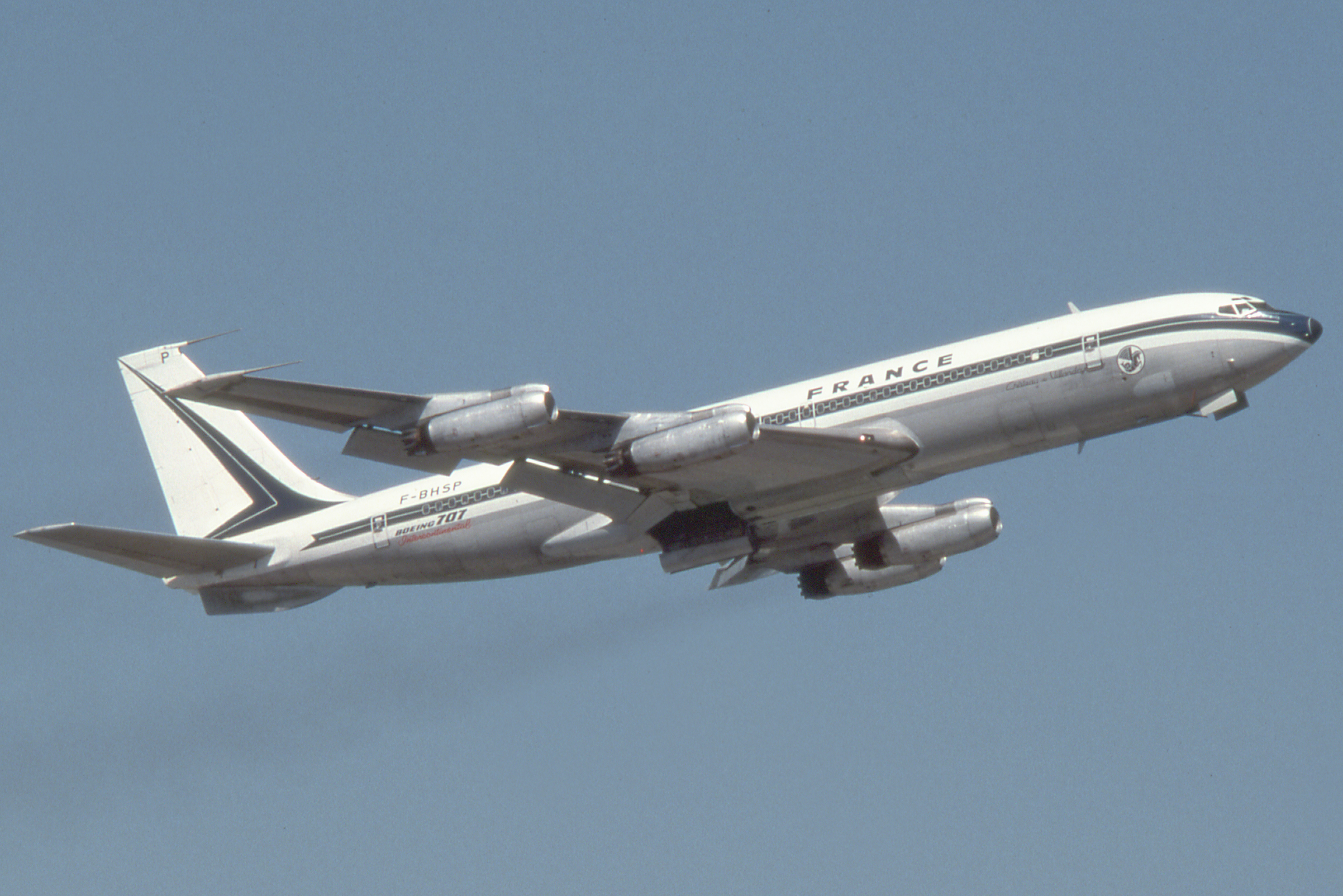
The stretched -320, powered by JT4A turbojets

The 707-320 Intercontinental is a stretched version of the turbojet-powered 707-120, initially powered by JT4A-3 or JT4A-5 turbojets producing 15,800 lbf (70.3 kN) each (most eventually got 17,500 lbf (77.8 kN) JT4A-11s). The interior allowed up to 189 passengers, the same as the -120 and -220 series, but improved two-class capacity due to an 80-in fuselage stretch ahead of the wing (from 138 ft 10 in (42.32 m) to 145 ft 6 in (44.35 m) ), with extensions to the fin and horizontal stabilizer extending the aircraft's length further. The longer wing carried more fuel, increasing range by 1,600 miles (1,400 nmi; 2,600 km) and allowing the aircraft to operate as true transoceanic aircraft. The wing modifications included outboard and inboard inserts, as well as a kink in the trailing edge to add area inboard. Takeoff weight was increased to 302,000 lb (137,000 kg) initially and to 312,000 lb (142,000 kg) with the higher-rated JT4As and center section tanks. Its first flight was on January 11, 1958; 69 turbojet 707-320s were delivered through January 1963, the first passengers being carried (by Pan Am) in August 1959. The only other customers to order this variant directly from Boeing were Air France, Sabena, South African Airways, and TWA.

=== 707-420 ===
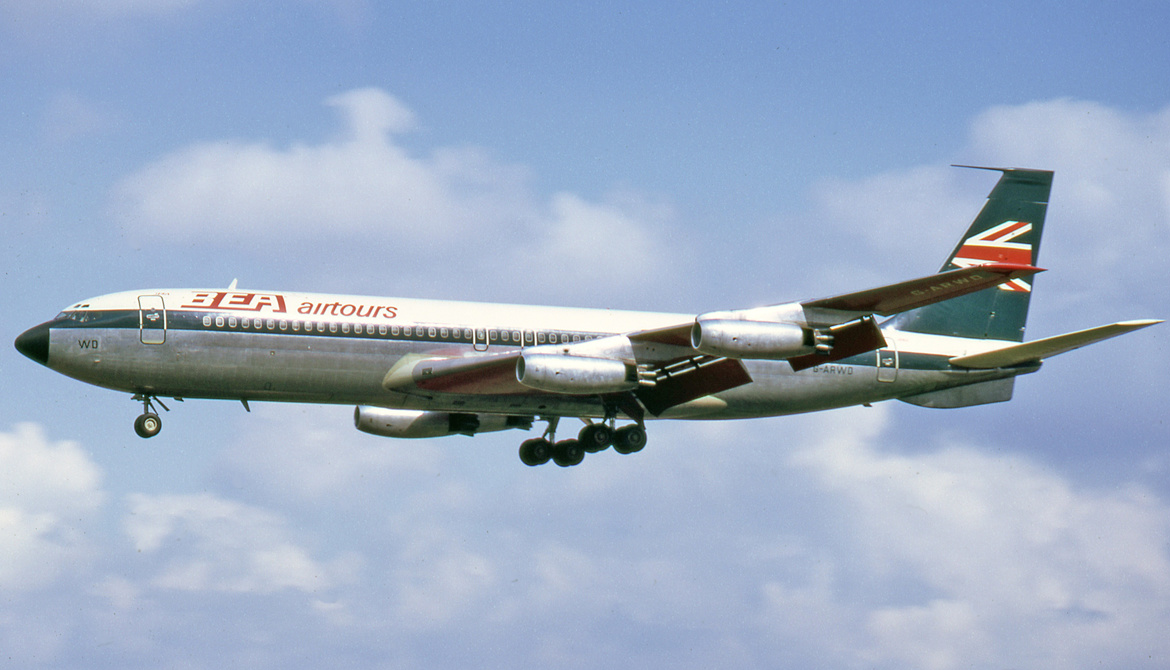
A BEA Airtours -420, powered by Rolls-Royce Conway low-bypass turbofans

The 707-420 was identical to the -320, but fitted with Rolls-Royce Conway 508 (RCo.12) turbofans (or by-pass turbojets as Rolls-Royce called them) of 18,000 lbf (80 kN) thrust each. The first announced customer was Lufthansa. BOAC's controversial order was announced six months later, but the British carrier got the first service-ready aircraft off the production line. The British Air Registration Board refused to give the aircraft a certificate of airworthiness, citing insufficient yaw control, excessive rudder forces, and the ability to over-rotate on takeoff, stalling the wing on the ground (a fault of the de Havilland Comet 1). Boeing responded by adding 40 in (100 cm) to the vertical stabilizer, applying full instead of partial rudder boost, and fitting an underfin to prevent over-rotation. These modifications except to the fin under the tail became standard on all 707 variants and were retrofitted to all earlier 707s. The 37 -420s were delivered to BOAC, Lufthansa, Air-India, El Al, and Varig through November 1963; Lufthansa was the first to carry passengers, in March 1960.

=== 707-320B ===
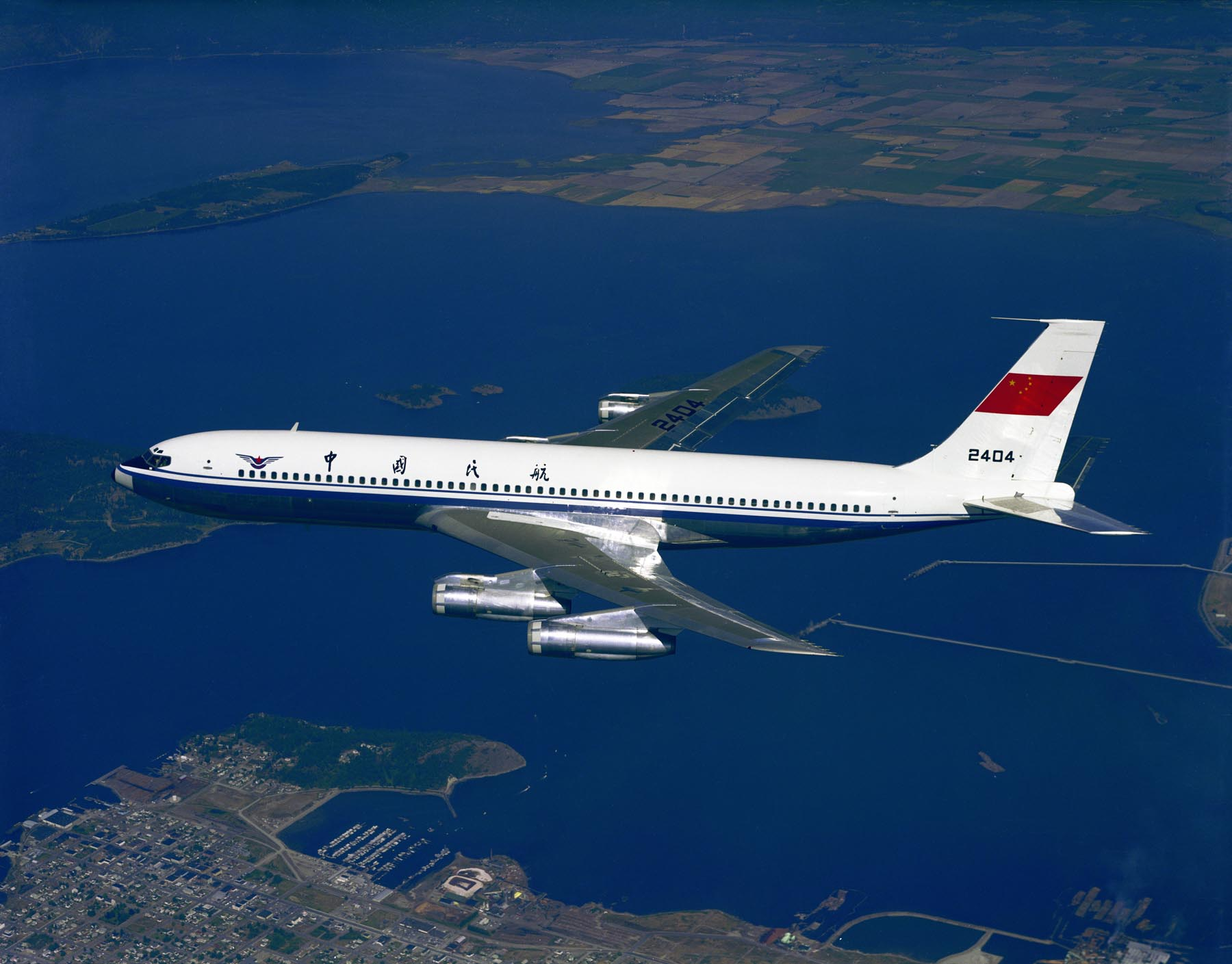
The -320B, powered by JT3D turbofans

The 707-320B had the application of the JT3D turbofan to the Intercontinental, but with aerodynamic refinements. The wing was modified from the -320 by adding a second inboard kink, a dog-toothed leading edge, and curved low-drag wingtips instead of the earlier blunt ones. These wingtips increased overall wingspan by 3.0 ft (0.9 m). Takeoff gross weight was increased to 328,000 lb (149,000 kg). The 175 707-320B aircraft were all new-build; no original -320 models were converted to fan engines in civilian use. First service was June 1962, with Pan Am.

The 707-320B Advanced is an improved version of the -320B, adding the three-section leading-edge flaps already seen on the -320C. These reduced takeoff and landing speeds and altered the lift distribution of the wing, allowing the ventral fin found on earlier 707s to be removed. From 1965, -320Bs had the uprated -320C undercarriage allowing the same 335,000 lb (152,000 kg) MTOW. These were often identified as 707-320BA-H.

=== 707-320C ===
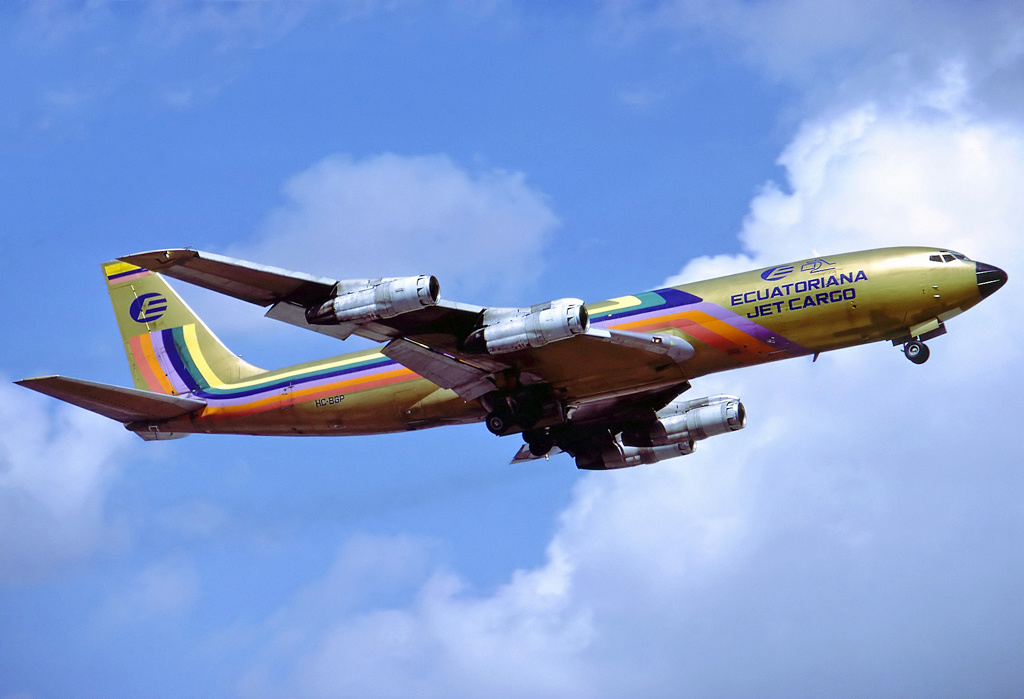
The 707-320C, a convertible passenger–freight configuration

The 707-320C has a convertible passenger–freight configuration, which became the most widely produced variant of the 707. The 707-320C added a strengthened floor and a new cargo door to the -320B model. The wing was fitted with three-section leading-edge flaps which allowed the removal of the underfin. A total of 335 of this variant were built, including some with JT3D-7 engines (19,000 lbf (85 kN) takeoff thrust) and a takeoff weight of 335,000 lb (152,000 kg). Most -320Cs were delivered as passenger aircraft with airlines hoping the cargo door would increase second-hand values. The addition of two new emergency exits, one on each side aft of the wing, raised the maximum passenger limit to 219. Only a few aircraft were delivered as pure freighters. One of the final orders was by the Iranian Government for 14 707-3J9C aircraft capable of VIP transportation, communication, and in-flight refueling tasks.

=== 707-700 ===
The 707-700 was a test aircraft used to study the feasibility of using CFM International CFM56 engines on a 707 airframe and possibly retrofitting existing aircraft with the engine. After testing in 1979, N707QT, the last commercial 707 airframe, was restored to 707-320C configuration and delivered to the Moroccan Air Force as a tanker aircraft via a "civilian" order. Boeing abandoned the retrofit program, since they felt it would be a threat to the 757 and 767 programs. The information gathered from testing led to the eventual retrofitting of CFM56 engines to the USAF C-135/KC-135R models, and some military versions of the 707 also used the CFM56. The Douglas DC-8 "Super 70" series with CFM56 engines was developed and extended the DC-8's life in a stricter noise regulatory environment. As a result, significantly more DC-8s remained in service into the 21st century than 707s.

=== Undeveloped variants ===
The 707-620 was a proposed domestic range-stretched variant of the 707-320B. The 707-620 was to carry around 200 passengers while retaining several aspects of the 707-320B. It would have been delivered around 1968 and would have also been Boeing's answer to the stretched Douglas DC-8 Series 60. Had the 707-620 been built, it would have cost around US$8,000,000. However, engineers discovered that a longer fuselage and wing meant a painstaking redesign of the wing and landing-gear structures. Rather than spend money on upgrading the 707, engineer Joe Sutter stated the company "decided spending money on the 707 wasn't worth it". The project was cancelled in 1966 in favor of the newer Boeing 747.

The 707-820 was a proposed intercontinental stretched variant of the 707-320B. This 412,000-pound MTOW (187,000 kg) variant was to be powered by four 22,500-pound-force thrust (100 kN) Pratt & Whitney JT3D-15 turbofan engines, and it would have had a nearly 10-foot (3.0 m) extension in wingspan, to 155.5 feet (47.4 m). Two variations were proposed, the 707-820(505) model and the 707-820(506) model. The 505 model would have had a fuselage 45 feet (14 m) longer than the 707-320B, for a total length of 198.6 feet (60.5 m). This model would have carried 209 passengers in mixed-class configuration and 260 passengers in all-economy configuration. The 506 model would have had a fuselage 55 feet (17 m) longer than the 707-320B, to 208.6 feet (63.6 m) in length. This second model would have carried 225 passengers in mixed-class configuration and 279 passengers in all-economy configuration. Like the 707-620, the 707-820 was also set to compete with the stretched DC-8-60 Super Series models. The design was being pitched to American, TWA, BOAC, and Pan Am at the time of its proposal in early 1965. The 707-820 would have cost US$10,000,000. Like the 707-620, the 707-820 would have required a massive structural redesign to the wing and gear structures. The 707-820 was also cancelled in 1966 in favor of the 747.

=== Military versions ===
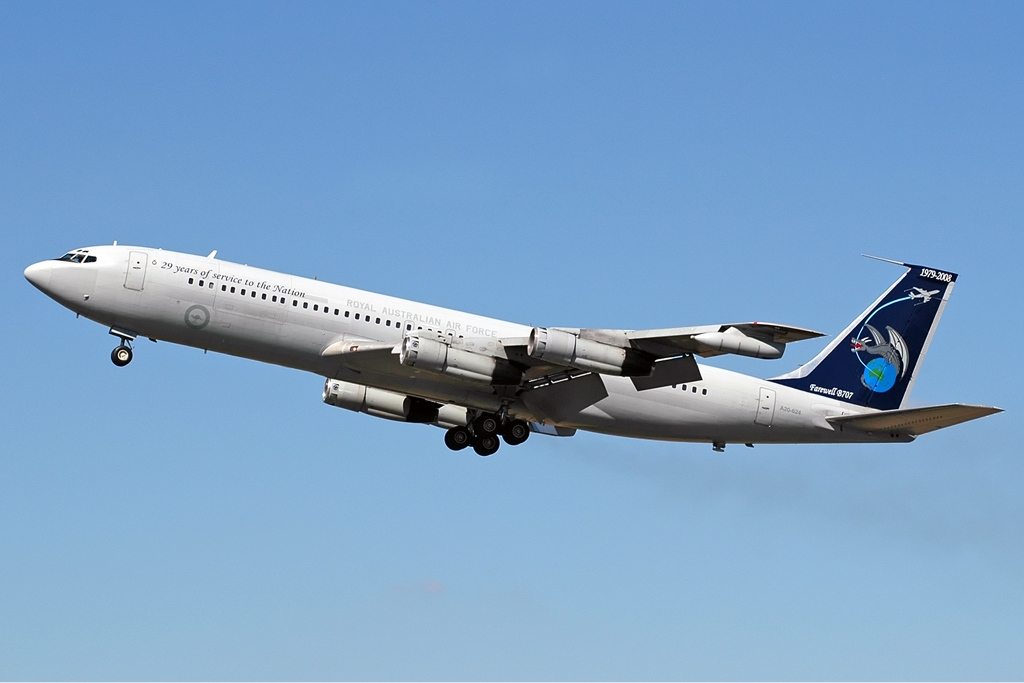
RAAF 707-320C

The militaries of the US and other countries have used the civilian 707 aircraft in a variety of roles, and under different designations. (The 707 and US Air Force's KC-135 were developed in parallel from the Boeing 367–80 prototype.)

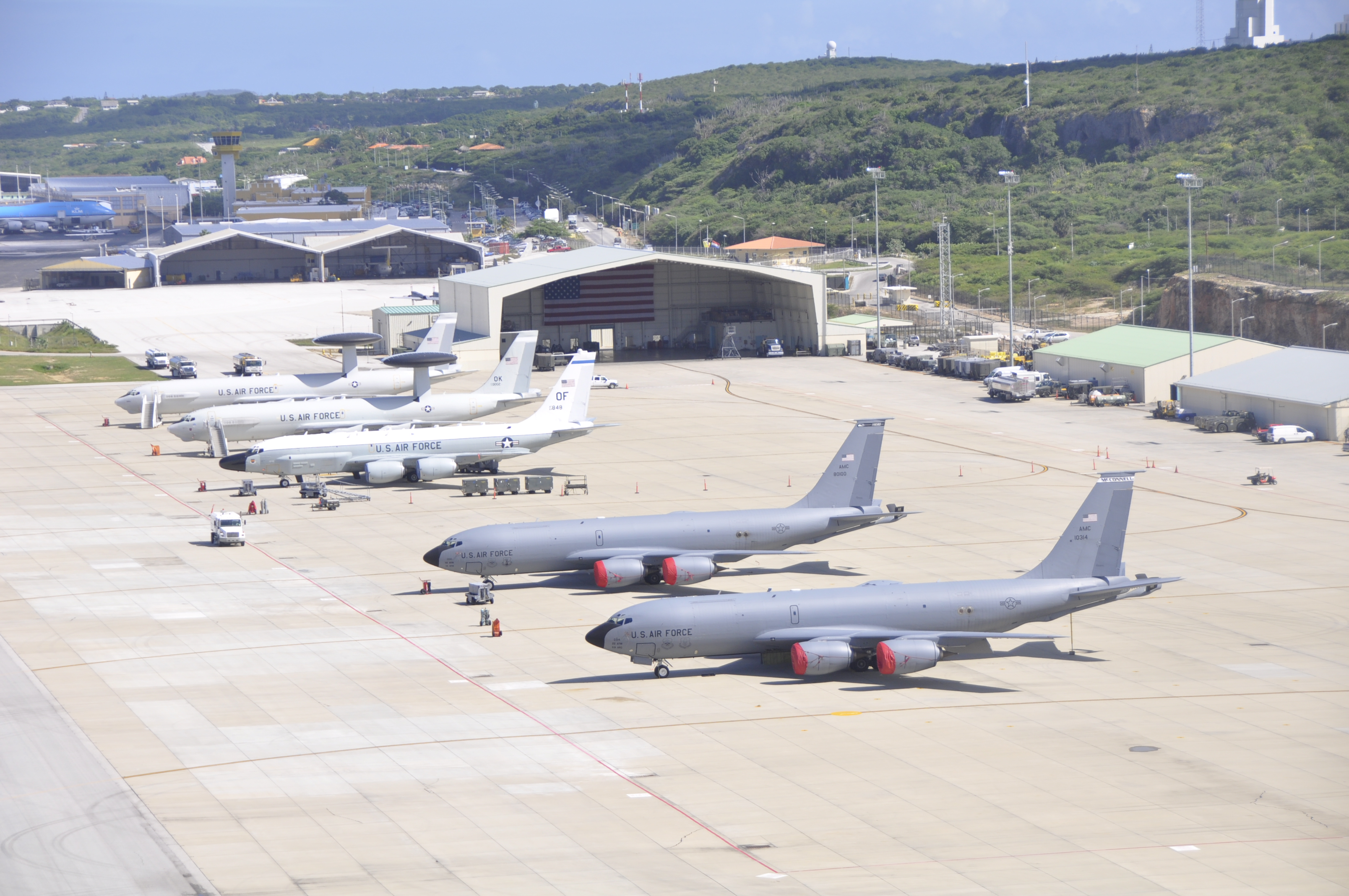
The United States Air Force is still operating many aircraft using the 707 platform including the KC-135, RC-135, and E-3.

The Boeing E-3 Sentry is a US military airborne warning and control system (AWACS) aircraft based on the Boeing 707 that provides all-weather surveillance, command, control, and communications.

The Northrop Grumman E-8 Joint STARS is an aircraft modified from the Boeing 707-300 series commercial airliner. The E-8 carries specialized radar, communications, operations and control subsystems. The most prominent external feature is the 40 ft (12 m) canoe-shaped radome under the forward fuselage that houses the 24 ft (7.3 m) APY-7 active electronically scanned array side looking airborne radar antenna.

The VC-137 variant of the Stratoliner was a special-purpose design meant to serve as Air Force One, the secure transport for the President of the United States. These models were in operational use from 1962 to 1990. The first presidential jet aircraft, a VC-137B designated SAM 970, is on display at the Museum of Flight in Seattle. Two VC-137C aircraft are on display with SAM 26000 at the National Museum of the United States Air Force near Dayton, Ohio and SAM 27000 at the Ronald Reagan Presidential Library in Simi Valley, California.

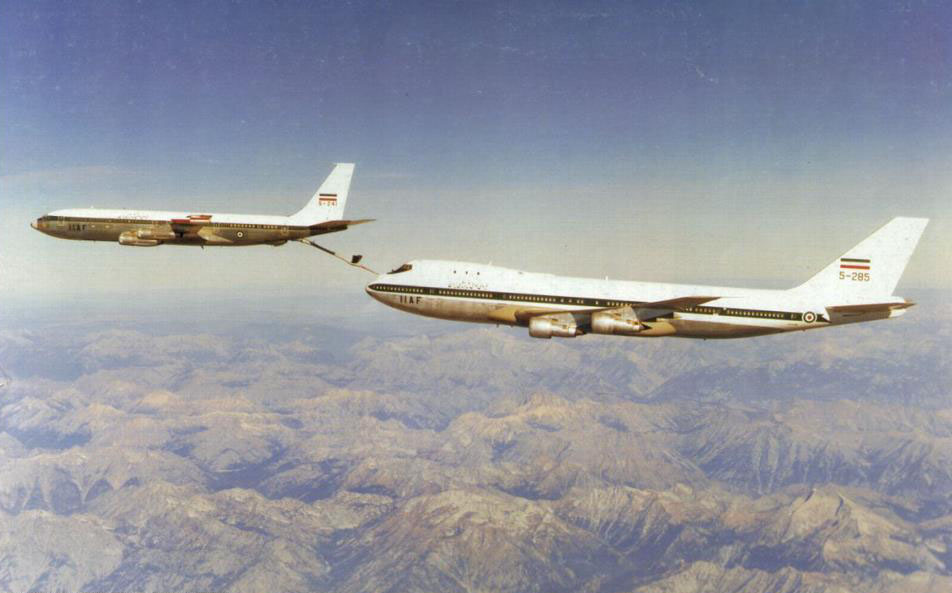
An Imperial Iranian Air Force KC-707 refuels an IIAF Boeing 747

The Canadian Forces also operated the Boeing 707 with the designation CC-137 Husky (707-347C) from 1971 to 1997.

Israel Defense Forces operate KC-707 "Re'em" aerial refuelling planes.

Boeing 717 was the company designation for the C-135 Stratolifter and KC-135 Stratotanker derivatives of the 367-80. (The 717 designation was later reused in renaming the McDonnell Douglas MD-95 to Boeing 717 after the company merged with Boeing.)

=== Comparison of variants ===
Below is a list of major differences between the 707 variants.

Variant	707-120	707-120B	707-320	707-420	707-320B	707-320C
Passenger capacity	174		189			194
Length	145 ft 1 in (44.22 m)		152 ft 11 in (46.61 m)			
Wingspan	130 ft 10 in (39.88 m)		142 ft 5 in (43.41 m)		145 ft 9 in (44.42 m)	
Wing area	2,433 sq ft (226.0 m^{2})		3,050 sq ft (283 m^{2})			
MTOW	247,000 lb (112 t)	258,000 lb (117 t)	312,000 lb (142 t)		333,600 lb (151.3 t)	
OEW	122,533 lb (55.580 t) (Note: domestic configuration)	127,500 lb (57.8 t)	142,600 lb (64.7 t) (Note: international configuration)		148,800 lb (67.5 t)	148,300 lb (67.3 t) (Note: convertible: cargo)
Fuel capacity	17,330 US gal (14,430 imp gal; 65,600 L)		23,820 US gal (19,830 imp gal; 90,200 L)		23,855 US gal (19,863 imp gal; 90,300 L)	
Engines (x4)	P&W JT3C-6	P&W JT3D-1	JT4A-11/12	Conway-12	P&W JT3D-3B	P&W JT3D-3B/7
Thrust per engine	13,500 lbf (60 kN)	17,000 lbf (76 kN)	17,500 lbf (78 kN)		18,000 lbf (80 kN)	18,000 lbf (80 kN) - 19,000 lbf (85 kN)
Cruise speed	484–540 kn (896–1,000 km/h; 557–621 mph)		478–525 kn (885–972 km/h; 550–604 mph)			
Range	3,000 nmi (5,600 km; 3,500 mi) (Note: 137 passengers and baggage)	3,600 nmi (6,700 km; 4,100 mi)	3,750 nmi (6,940 km; 4,320 mi) (Note: 141 passengers and baggage)		5,000 nmi (9,300 km; 5,800 mi)	2,900 nmi (5,400 km; 3,300 mi) (Note: 13 88×125 inch pallets + 17,000 lb (7.7 t) lower deck cargo)
Takeoff distance	7,500 ft (2.3 km)		10,700 ft (3.25 km)		10,000 ft (3 km)	
Landing (Note: MLW, SL, dry)	6,500 ft (2.0 km)		7,200 ft (2.2 km)		5,900 ft (1.8 km)	6,200 ft (1.9 km)

== Operators ==
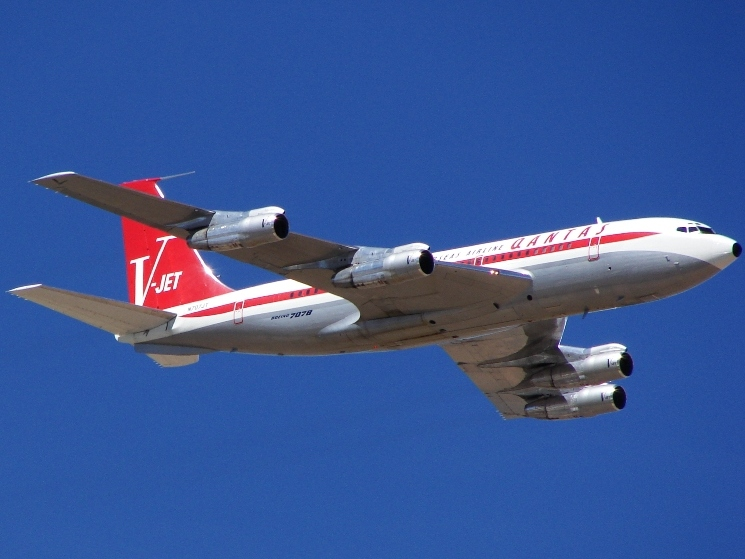
John Travolta's 707-138: a -120 shortened by 10 ft (3.0 m)

Boeing's customer codes used to identify specific options and livery specified by customers was started with the 707, and has been maintained through all Boeing's models. In essence the same system as used on the earlier Boeing 377, the code consisted of two digits affixed to the model number to identify the specific aircraft version. For example, Pan Am was assigned code "21". Thus, a 707-320B sold to Pan Am had the model number 707-321B. The number remained constant as further aircraft were purchased; thus, when Pan Am purchased the 747-100, it had the model number 747-121.

In the 1980s, the USAF acquired around 250 used 707s to provide replacement turbofan engines for the KC-135E Stratotanker program.

The 707 is no longer operated by commercial airlines. American actor John Travolta owned an ex-Qantas 707-138B, with the registration N707JT. In May 2017, he donated the plane to the Historical Aircraft Restoration Society near Wollongong, Australia. The plane was in 2017 originally planned to be flown to Shellharbour Airport, where HARS is based. However, the aircraft eventually arrived in Australia in May 2026 in several pieces by sea.

== Orders and deliveries ==
=== Deliveries ===
707 Delivery Summary
Total	1994	1993	1992	1991	1990	1989	1988	1987	1986	1985	1984	1983	1982	1981	1980	1979	1978	1977	1976
1010	1	0	5	14	4	5	0	9	4	3	8	8	8	2	3	6	13	8	9
1975	1974	1973	1972	1971	1970	1969	1968	1967	1966	1965	1964	1963	1962	1961	1960	1959	1958	1957	1956
7	21	11	4	10	19	59	111	118	83	61	38	34	68	80	91	77	8	0	0

=== 707 Model summary ===
707 Model Summary
Series	Deliveries
707-120	56
707-120B	72
707-138	7
707-138B	6
707-220	5
707-320	69
707-320B	174
707-320C	337
707-420	37
707-E3A	57
707-E3D	7
707-E3F	4
707-E6A	17
707-KE3	8
707 Total	856
720-000	65
720-000B	89
720 Total	154
707+720 Total	1010

== Accidents and incidents ==
As of January 2019, the 707 has been in 261 aviation occurrences and 174 hull-loss accidents with a total of 3,039 fatalities. The deadliest incident involving the 707 was the Agadir air disaster which took place on August 3, 1975, with 188 fatalities.

On January 14, 2019, EP-CPP, a Saha Airlines cargo flight crashed, killing 15 people and seriously injuring one more person. It was the last civil 707 in operation.

== Aircraft on display ==
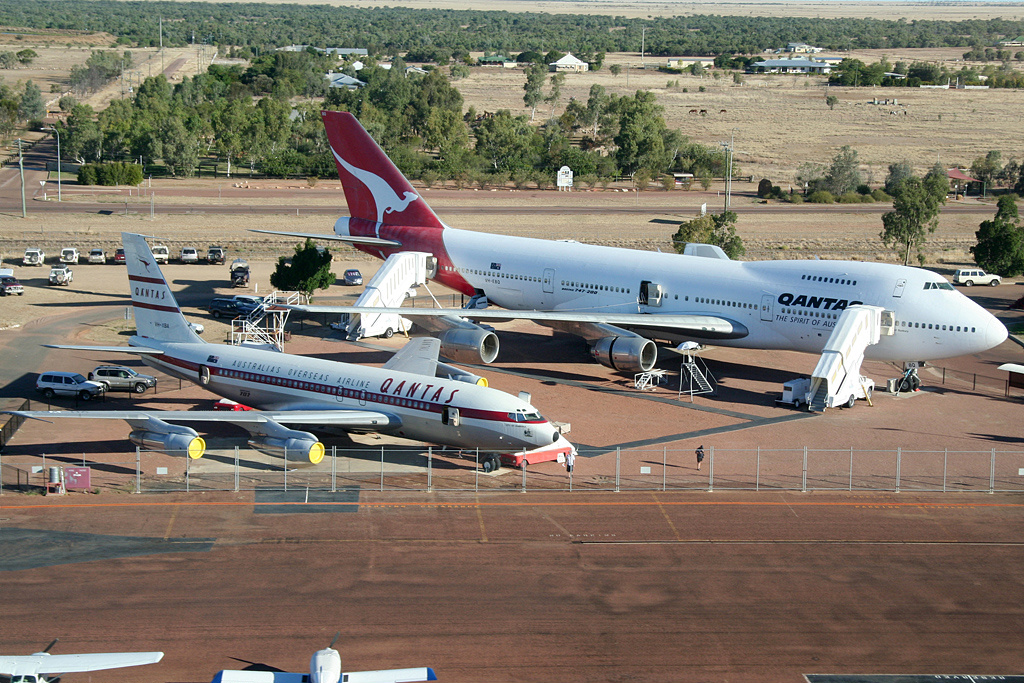
The Qantas 707-138B alongside a Boeing 747-238B at the Qantas Founders Museum

- VH-XBA model 707-138B (line number 29) is one of the first 707s exported, and the first civilian jet registered in Australia (to Qantas in 1959); it is on display at the Qantas Founders Museum in Longreach, Australia.
- 4X-BYD model 707-131(F), (line number 34), an ex-Israeli Air Force and TWA aircraft, is on display at the Israeli Air Force Museum near Hatzerim, Israel.
- N3951A, a model 707-123B (line number 53), was formerly owned by Excelair, a private aircraft leasing and executive charter company (configured as a corporate VIP aircraft for private charter). It previously served with American Airlines, Quebecair, and United African Airlines. Its forward nose section is currently preserved at the Technik Museum Speyer.
- N7515A model 707-123B (MSN 17642, line number 41), posing as D-ABOF, a 707-123B formerly operated by American Airlines and American Trans Air has its nose section preserved at the Deutsches Museum in Munich.
- 58-6970 Model 707-120 VC-137B SAM 970, a former Air Force One, formerly known as "Queenie", is on display at the Museum of Flight, Seattle, WA.
- 58-6971 Model 707-153 VC-137B is on display at the Pima Air and Space Museum adjacent to Davis-Monthan AFB in Tucson, AZ. This aircraft became known as "Freedom One" after serving in the return of the American hostages from Tehran, Iran in 1981.
- N714PA model 707-321 (MSN 17592, line number 13), the first Boeing 707-300 series prototype produced, originally delivered to Pan American World Airways, has its forward cockpit preserved at the New England Air Museum.
- 9T-MSS, a model 707-382B (line number 751), was a former government aircraft of the Republic of Zaire (now the Democratic Republic of the Congo). Initially delivered to TAP Air Portugal, it served as the aircraft for Mobutu Sese Seko from 1986 to the mid-1990s. Following its retirement, it was parked at Humberto Delgado Airport in Lisbon, Portugal for 15 years until it was dismantled in 2006, after which it was handed over to the Portuguese Air Force. Its forward nose section is currently preserved at the Museu do Ar, with the left side painted in TAP Air Portugal livery and the right side in Portuguese Air Force colors.
- TY-BBW model 707-321 (MSN 18084, line number 212), a former Benin government aircraft originally delivered to Pan American World Airways as N758PA. Grounded at Ostend–Bruges International Airport in 1990 due to severe structural and safety issues, it was abandoned after the government defaulted on parking fees. It was later purchased by Belgian politician Walter Govaert, dismantled, and moved to Wetteren. The fuselage was subsequently hoisted by crane onto the roof of the Expo Gowalt exhibition center to bypass local land regulations, where it remains today.
- OO-SJA model 707-329 (line number 78), ex-Sabena, is the first jetliner registered in Belgium; forward fuselage, salvaged following an uncontained engine failure and emergency landing, is on display at the Royal Military Museum Brussels.
- 4X-JYW model 707-328 (MSN 173617, line number 110), is a former Air France (F-BHSE) aircraft sold to the Israeli Air Force; it is on display at the Israeli Air Force Museum, Beersheba – Hatzerim (LLHB).
- 4X-ATA model 707-458 (MSN 18070, line number 205) is a former El Al aircraft, the nose of which is preserved at the Cradle of Aviation Museum in Garden City, New York.
- G-APFG, a model 707-436 (line number 128), previously served with BOAC and British Airtours. Following its retirement in 1981, it was used as a ground training airframe by Aviation Traders at London Stansted Airport. In 1989, the fuselage was moved to Cardington for fire and smoke suppression trials, and the remaining sections were scrapped in 2000. Its forward nose section is currently painted in BOAC livery and preserved at the South Wales Aviation Museum.
- G-APFJ model 707-436 (MSN 17711, line number 163) is a forward fuselage on display at the National Museum of Flight, East Fortune, in BOAC livery (Boeing 707-436 G-APFJ was initially preserved British Airtours livery at Royal Air Force Museum Cosford as the within the UK only surviving B707 with Rolls-Royce Conway engines. It was scrapped in 2006).
- 5X-CAU model 707-436 (MSN 17713, line number 169), a former BOAC, British Airtours, and Ugandan government aircraft. It has been repainted and is on static display at the Aero Beach theme park and cafeteria near Entebbe, Uganda.
- G-APFP model 707-436 (MSN 17717, line number 176), a former BOAC and British Airways aircraft. Donated by Boeing to The Franklin Institute in Philadelphia in 1976, it was displayed outdoors in British Airways livery from 1977 to 1988. It was scrapped in June 1988 to accommodate museum expansion, with only its nose section preserved by a private collector.
- D-ABOD model 707-430 (MSN 17720, line number 115), posing as D-ABOB, a 707-430 formerly operated by Lufthansa (named Frankfurt), was used as a maintenance trainer before being sold to Hamburg Airport for 1 euro as a display aircraft. It was scrapped in June 2021 due to high maintenance costs.
- 4X-ATB model 707-458 (MSN 18071, line number 216), posing as D-ABOC, a 707-458 formerly operated by El Al, was gifted by Boeing to the city of Berlin in 1986 and displayed at Berlin Tegel Airport in a vintage Lufthansa livery (named Berlin). Due to severe deterioration, Lufthansa requested the removal of its branding, and the aircraft was eventually scrapped in September 2021 following the airport's closure.
- CC-CCG model 707-330B (MSN 18642, line number 233), an ex-Lufthansa and LAN Chile craft, is undergoing restoration at Santiago – Los Cerillos, Chile (ULC/SCTI) and will be repainted in the Chilean airline's 1960s scheme.
- F-BLCD model 707-328B (line number 471) is currently on display at the Musée de l'Air et de l'Espace, Paris, France.
- EP-IRJ model 707-321B (MSN 18958, line number 475), a former Iran Air aircraft, was originally delivered to Pan Am as N416PA, and is currently the Air Restaurant at Mehrabad Airport, Tehran.
- A20-627 model 707-338C (MSN 19627, line number 707) flew with the RAAF. Originally delivered to Qantas as VH-EAG, its forward fuselage is preserved at the Historical Aircraft Restoration Society, Albion Park Rail, New South Wales, Australia.
- 1419 model 707-328C (MSN 19917, line number 763), an ex-SAAF aircraft, is on display at the South African Air Force Museum – Swartkop Air Force Base, Pretoria.
- A20-623, a Boeing 707-338C (MSN 19623, Line Number 671), is a former Royal Australian Air Force aircraft that previously saw service with Qantas, British Caledonian, and Worldways Canada (Ontario Worldair / Worldways Canada), is on display at Brunswick Golden Isles Airport.
- TZ-TAC model 707-3L6B (MSN 21049, line number 896), a former Republic of Mali government aircraft, is on display at Brunswick Golden Isles Airport.
- N80AZ model 707-351C (MSN 18748, line number 379), a former Northwest Orient Airlines, Cathay Pacific, and Air Guinée aircraft. It was later operated by David Tokoph's private firm, Aviation Consultants, including a lease to the Angolan government, and is now on display at Bole International Airport, Addis Ababa.
- 5Y-BBK model 707-351B (MSN 19872, line number 742), a former Northwest Orient Airlines and Kenya Airways aircraft. In July 1989, the aircraft suffered a hydraulic failure while making an emergency landing at Addis Ababa due to a landing gear issue; it overran the runway, causing the gear to collapse and severe hull damage, but only resulted in six minor injuries. Written off as a total loss, the airframe remains abandoned at Bole International Airport to this day.
- PP-BRI model 707-351C (MSN 19776, line number 732), a former Northwest Orient Airlines aircraft subsequently operated as a freighter by Brazilian Express Transportes Aéreos. Following the airline's bankruptcy and legal asset seizure in 2012, the aircraft has been abandoned in a remote area of the airport tarmac.
- LX-N20000 Model 707-307C (MSN 20000, line number 759) as CT-49A (formerly known as a Trainer Cargo Aircraft / TCA), operated by the NATO Airborne Early Warning & Control Force, is preserved as an instructional airframe for training purposes at Manching Air Base in Manching, Germany, Managed by the Bundeswehr Technical and Airworthiness Center for Aircraft (WTD 61).
- N404PA model 707-321B (MSN 18835, line number 408), a former USAF Air Force Systems Command aircraft. It was later transferred to the MIT Lincoln Laboratory for use as the Lincoln Multifunction Intelligence, Surveillance, and Reconnaissance Testbed (LiMIT) flight test platform. It is now on display at Davis–Monthan Air Force Base in Tucson, Arizona, managed by the 309th Aerospace Maintenance and Regeneration Group.
- N893PA model 707-321B (MSN 20030, line number 791), a ground instructional trainer at the CAUC originally delivered to Pan Am, is preserved at Tianjin, China.
- HZ-HM2 Model 707-386C (MSN 21081, line number 903) is a Saudi Air Force VIP aircraft painted in the current Saudia color scheme; delivered in 1975, it is registered as HZ-HM1 and preserved at the Saudi Air Force Museum, Riyadh.
- 62-6000 Model 707-320B (VC-137C SAM 26000), a former Air Force One aircraft, is on display at the National Museum of the United States Air Force at Wright-Patterson AFB near Dayton, Ohio.
- 72-7000 Model 707-353B (VC-137C SAM 27000), a former Air Force One aircraft, is on display at the Ronald Reagan Presidential Library in Simi Valley, California.

== Specifications (Boeing 707-320C with JT3D-7) ==
three-view diagram

Data from

General characteristics

- Crew: 3
- Capacity: 194 passengers (Note: 219 passengers with optional 2 additional emergency exits.) (all passenger configuration) or 13 cargo pallets (all cargo configuration)
- Length: 152 ft 11 in (46.61 m)
- Wingspan: 145 ft 9 in (44.42 m)
- Width: 12 ft 4 in (3.76 m) (fuselage)
- Height: 42 ft 0 in (12.80 m)
- Wing area: 3,050 sq ft (283 m^{2})
- Empty weight: 148,300 lb (67,268 kg) (all cargo configuration)
- Gross weight: 283,000 lb (128,367 kg)
- Max takeoff weight: 333,600 lb (151,318 kg)
- Fuel capacity: 23,855 US gal (19,863 imp gal; 90,300 L)
- Powerplant: 4 × Pratt & Whitney JT3D-7 turbofan engine, 19,000 lbf (85 kN) thrust each

Performance

- Maximum speed: 454 mph (731 km/h, 394 kn) at 23,000 ft (7,000 m)
- Maximum speed: Mach 0.887
- Minimum control speed: 133 mph (214 km/h, 116 kn)
- Range: 3,300 mi (5,400 km, 2,900 nmi) with 13 pallets and 17,000 lb (7.7 t) lower deck cargo
- Service ceiling: 42,000 ft (13,000 m)
- Takeoff distance: 10,000 ft (3 km)
- Landing distance: 6,200 ft (1.9 km)

== See also ==
- Aircraft in fiction, Boeing 707

Related development

- Boeing 367-80
- Boeing KC-135 Stratotanker
- Boeing 720
- Boeing 727
- Boeing 737

Aircraft of comparable role, configuration, and era

- de Havilland Comet
- Convair 880
- Convair 990 Coronado
- Douglas DC-8
- Ilyushin Il-62
- Shanghai Y-10
- Vickers VC10

Related lists

- List of jet airliners
- List of Boeing customer codes
