= 1959 Washington Boeing 707 crash =

1959 aircraft accident

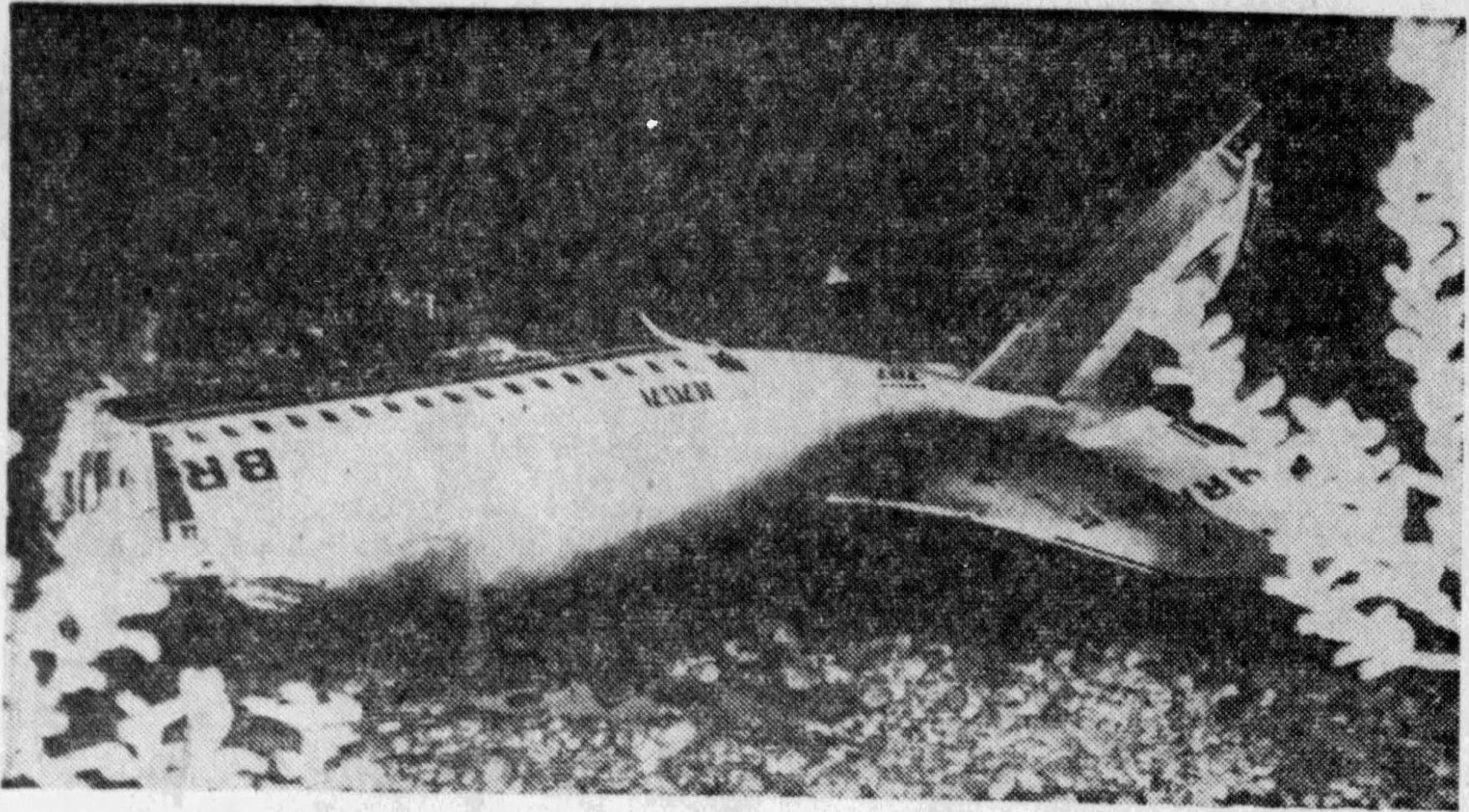
- Wreckage of the tail section

Accident
- Date: October 19, 1959 (66 years ago)
- Summary: Engine separations due to excessive Dutch rolls, pilot error
- Site: Stillaguamish River, near Arlington, Washington, U.S.; 48.270112°N 121.94712°W

Aircraft
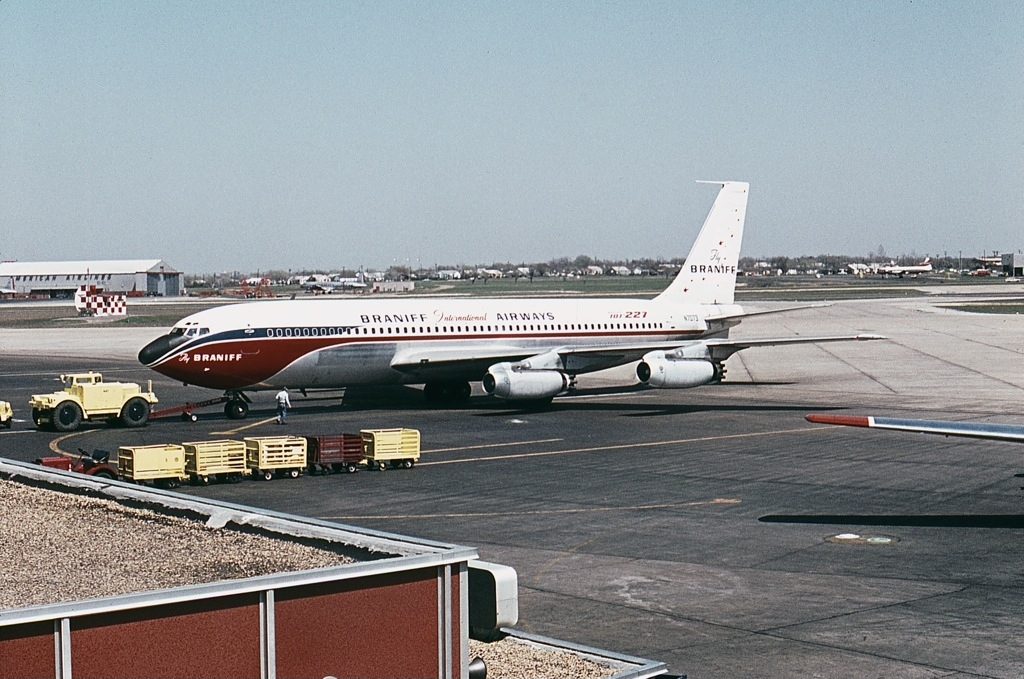
- A Boeing 707-227 in Braniff International Airways livery, similar to the aircraft involved
- Aircraft type: Boeing 707-227
- Operator: Boeing
- Registration: N7071
- Flight origin: Boeing Field, Washington, U.S.
- Destination: Boeing Field, Washington, U.S.
- Occupants: 8
- Passengers: 4
- Crew: 4
- Fatalities: 4
- Injuries: 4
- Survivors: 4

On October 19, 1959, a Boeing 707, registration N7071, was on a demonstration and acceptance flight before being delivered to Braniff International Airways. The flight was also used to instruct Braniff pilots. During some maneuvers, flight control was lost and aerodynamic forces caused three of the 707's four engines to be separated from the aircraft. Subsequently, the plane crash landed near Arlington, Washington. All four crew members were killed, while four observing passengers, located in the rear section of the plane, were injured but survived.

== Background ==
=== Aircraft ===
The aircraft involved was a Boeing 707-227 registered as N7071 with serial number 17691. It was manufactured on June 11, 1959. It was operated by Boeing Airplane Company and it had accumulated 173 flight hours.

=== Crew ===
Captain Russel Baum, aged 32, was a Boeing test pilot with 5,015 flight hours. Captain John Berke, aged 49, was employed by Braniff International Airways and had logged 23,563 flight hours. Captain Frank Staley Jr., age 43, was also employed by Braniff and had accumulated 20,450 flight hours. Flight Engineer Carl Hagan, aged 28, was employed by Boeing and had accumulated 1,260 flight hours. Baum served as instructor for the Captains Berke and Staley, who were on their first training flight on the 707.

=== Passengers ===
Four observers were also on the flight, listed as passengers: a flight engineer from Braniff, a technical instructor from Braniff, a pilot from Boeing, and an inspector from the Federal Aviation Administration (FAA).

== Flight ==
The aircraft took off from Boeing Field at around 13:30 local time for a flight expected to last 4 hours and 15 minutes. Pilot-trainee Berke was in the left seat (conventionally occupied by the pilot in command), with instructor-pilot Baum occupying the right seat. After the takeoff, a series of maneuvers were demonstrated by Baum, after which Berke executed them himself. One of these maneuvers was the Dutch roll, which Baum initiated and which Berke then was assigned to recover from. After making the recoveries in a clean configuration (no flaps or landing gear extended), the aircraft was slowed down to 155 knots (287 km/h; 178 mph) and the flaps were extended to 40 degrees. Even though the absolute maximum bank angle permitted during the Dutch roll was 25 degrees, the bank exceeded this limitation. The pilot riding as a passenger reminded Baum of these restrictions, which he acknowledged.

Baum then suggested attempting a recovery from a nose-right position, and initiated a Dutch roll with a bank angle of 40 to 60 degrees. The aircraft completed several of these rolls before a recovery was attempted, and Berke banked to the right while the aircraft was already banking to the right. The aircraft yawed to the right and the bank angle increased past 90 degrees. Baum used left aileron to induce a violent left roll. The aircraft rotated around several times to the left, before the plane settled in an inverted nose-down position. The crew managed to recover from the dive; however, engine number 1 and engine number 4 had detached completely, with small fires burning where the engines had been. Engine number 2 was on fire and hanging downwards due to its forward mount failing. It soon detached completely; however, an intense fire remained on the wing.

The aircraft had broken through the clouds and the pilot riding as a passenger suggested ditching in nearby Lake Cavanaugh, so the four passengers moved to the rear of the cabin to prepare for a possible water landing. Running the remaining engine (number 3) alone would have been enough to reach the nearest airport; however, the fire raging in the left wing destroyed the left inboard aileron and disabled the outboard ailerons. Additionally, the loss of power caused by the loss of three engines disabled the inboard spoilers and the rudder boost, leaving only the right inboard aileron and outboard spoilers. Fire damage on the wing reduced its lift, leading to a rolling momentum. This roll could temporarily be countered for by reducing the power of the remaining engine. Before the impact, that engine was shut down. Eyewitnesses reported that large portions of the left wing had burned away.

The crew elected to attempt a landing in an open field; however, they did not have enough altitude and the plane first impacted 110-foot-tall (34 m) trees approximately one-half mile (0.80 km) short of the field. A 16-foot-long (4.9 m) portion of the left wing was torn off after hitting a tree. The left wing dropped and hit the ground, followed by the nose section, which was destroyed by the impact and the ensuing fire, killing all four crew members. The aft section, where the four survivors were located, detached aft of the wings and came to rest in the North Fork of the Stillaguamish River.

== Investigation ==
The accident was investigated by the Civil Aeronautics Board (CAB). They determined that the accident was a result of the instructor pilot performing a Dutch roll that was extreme. There was no valid reason for him to do this as it would not have had instructional value. It is understandable that Captain Berke, who was new to the 707, was unable to recover.

The CAB determined that the probable cause of this accident was, "The structural failures induced during an improper recovery attempt from a Dutch Roll which exceeded the angle-of-bank limits prescribed by the company."

As a result of the accident, several changes to the 707 were made, including the increasing of the vertical stabilizer area and making the rudder boosted at all times. These changes made the aircraft more stable and easier to control.
