= Phugoid =

Aircraft motion involving constant angle of attack but varying pitch

A diagrammatic representation of a fixed-wing airplane in phugoid

In aviation, a phugoid or fugoid (/ˈfjuːɡɔɪd/) is an aircraft motion in which the vehicle pitches up and climbs, and then pitches down and descends, accompanied by speeding up and slowing down as it goes "downhill" and "uphill". This is one of the basic flight dynamics modes of an aircraft (others include short period, roll subsidence, dutch roll, and spiral divergence).

== Detailed description ==
The phugoid has a nearly constant angle of attack but varying pitch, caused by a repeated exchange of airspeed and altitude. It can be excited by an elevator singlet (a short, sharp deflection followed by a return to the centered position) resulting in a pitch increase with no change in trim from the cruise condition. As speed decays, the nose drops below the horizon. Speed increases, and the nose climbs above the horizon. Periods can vary from under 30 seconds for light aircraft to minutes for larger aircraft. Microlight aircraft typically show a phugoid period of 15–25 seconds, and it has been suggested that birds and model airplanes show convergence between the phugoid and short period modes. A classical model for the phugoid period can be simplified to about (0.85 times the speed in knots) seconds, but this only really works for larger aircraft.

Phugoids are often demonstrated to student pilots as an example of the speed stability of the aircraft and the importance of proper trimming. When it occurs, it is considered a nuisance, and in lighter airplanes (typically showing a shorter period) it can be a cause of pilot-induced oscillation.

The phugoid, for moderate amplitude, occurs at an effectively constant angle of attack, although in practice the angle of attack actually varies by a few tenths of a degree. This means that the stalling angle of attack is never exceeded, and it is possible (in the <1g section of the cycle) to fly at speeds below the known stalling speed. Free flight models with badly unstable phugoid typically stall or loop, depending on thrust.

An unstable or divergent phugoid is caused, mainly, by a large difference between the incidence angles of the wing and tail. A stable, decreasing phugoid can be attained by building a smaller stabilizer on a longer tail, or, at the expense of pitch and yaw "static" stability, by shifting the center of gravity to the rear.

Aerodynamically efficient aircraft typically have low phugoid damping.

The term "phugoid" was coined by Frederick W. Lanchester, the British aerodynamicist who first characterized the phenomenon. He derived the word from the Greek words φυγή and εἶδος to mean "flight-like" but recognized the diminished appropriateness of the derivation given that φυγή meant flight in the sense of "escape" (as in the word "fugitive") rather than vehicle flight.

== Aviation accidents ==
In 1972, an Aero Transporti Italiani Fokker F-27 Friendship, en route from Rome Fiumicino to Foggia, climbing through 13,500 feet, entered an area of poor weather with local thunderstorm activity. At almost 15,000 feet the aircraft suddenly lost 1,200 feet of altitude and its speed dropped. It developed phugoid oscillations from which the pilots could not recover. The aircraft struck the ground at a speed of 340 knots, causing the death of the three crew members and all fifteen passengers.

In the 1975 Tan Son Nhut C-5 accident, USAF C-5 68–0218 with flight controls damaged by failure of the rear cargo/pressure door, encountered phugoid oscillations while the crew was attempting a return to base and crash-landed in a rice paddy adjacent to the airport. Of the 328 people on board, 153 died, making it the deadliest accident involving a US military aircraft.

In 1985, Japan Air Lines Flight 123 lost all hydraulic controls after its vertical stabiliser blew off due to an aft pressure bulkhead failure, and went into phugoid motion. While the crew were able to maintain near-level flight through the use of engine power, the plane lost height over a mountain range northwest of Tokyo before crashing into Mount Takamagahara. With 520 deaths, it remains the deadliest single-aircraft disaster in history.

In 1989, United Airlines Flight 232 suffered an uncontained engine failure in the #2 (tail) engine, which caused total hydraulic system failure. The crew flew the aircraft with throttle only. Suppressing the phugoid tendency was particularly difficult. The pilots reached Sioux Gateway Airport but crashed during the landing attempt. All four cockpit crewmembers (one an assisting DC-10 captain on the flight as a passenger) and a majority of the passengers survived.

Another aircraft that lost all hydraulics and experienced phugoid was a DHL operated Airbus A300B4 that was hit by a surface-to-air missile fired by Iraqi militants in the 2003 Baghdad DHL attempted shootdown incident. This was the first time that a crew landed an air transport aircraft safely by only adjusting engine thrust.

The 2003 crash of the Helios solar-powered aircraft was precipitated by reacting to an inappropriately diagnosed phugoid oscillation that ultimately made the aircraft structure exceed design loads.

Chesley "Sully" Sullenberger, Captain of US Airways Flight 1549 that ditched in the Hudson River on January 15, 2009, said in a Google talk that the landing could have been less violent had the anti-phugoid software installed on the Airbus A320-214 not prevented him from manually getting maximum lift during the four seconds before water impact.

On 25 December 2024, an Embraer 190 operated as Azerbaijan Airlines Flight 8243 was likely damaged by a Russian SAM over Grozny. It was flown over an hour to near Aktau International Airport with failed hydraulics while undergoing phugoid oscillations.

== See also ==
- Index of aviation articles
- Maneuvering Characteristics Augmentation System
- Projectile motion
