= Aircraft dynamic modes =

Types of aircraft behavior

The dynamic stability of an aircraft refers to how the aircraft behaves after it has been disturbed following steady non-oscillating flight.

== Longitudinal modes ==
Oscillating motions can be described by two parameters, the period of time required for one complete oscillation, and the time required to damp to half-amplitude or the time to double the amplitude for a dynamically unstable motion. The longitudinal motion consists of two distinct oscillations, a long-period oscillation called a phugoid mode and a short-period oscillation referred to as the short-period mode.

=== Phugoid (longer period) oscillations ===
The longer period mode, called the "phugoid mode," is the one in which there is a large-amplitude variation of air-speed, pitch angle, and altitude, but almost no angle-of-attack variation. The phugoid oscillation is a slow interchange of kinetic energy (velocity) and potential energy (height) about some equilibrium energy level as the aircraft attempts to re-establish the equilibrium level-flight condition from which it had been disturbed. The motion is so slow that the impact of both inertial and damping forces is only very slight; however, despite damping forces being very weak, the period is so long that the pilot usually automatically corrects for this motion without being consciously aware that the oscillation even exists. Typically the period is 20–60 seconds. This oscillation can generally be controlled by the pilot.

=== Short period oscillations ===
With no special name, the shorter period mode is called simply the "short-period mode". The motion is a rapid pitching of the aircraft about the center of gravity, essentially an angle-of-attack variation. The short-period mode is an oscillation with a period of only a few seconds that is usually heavily damped by the existence of lifting surfaces far from the aircraft’s center of gravity, such as a horizontal tail or canard. The time to damp the amplitude to one-half of its value is usually on the order of 1 second. Ability to quickly self damp when the stick is briefly displaced is one of the many criteria for general aircraft certification.

== Lateral-directional modes ==
"Lateral-directional" modes involve rolling motions and yawing motions. Motions in one of these axes almost always couples into the other so the modes are generally discussed as the "lateral-directional modes". (Note: "Lateral" is used although the rolling motions are about the longitudinal axis.)

There are three types of possible lateral-directional dynamic motion: roll subsidence mode, spiral mode, and Dutch roll mode.

=== Roll subsidence mode ===
Roll subsidence mode is simply the damping of rolling motion. There is no direct aerodynamic moment created tending to directly restore wings-level, i.e. there is no returning "spring force/moment" proportional to roll angle. However, there is a damping moment (proportional to roll rate) created by the slewing-about of long wings. This prevents large roll rates from building up when roll-control inputs are made or it damps the roll rate (not the angle) to zero when there are no roll-control inputs.

Roll mode can be improved by dihedral effects coming from design characteristics, such as high wings, dihedral angles or sweep angles.

=== Dutch roll mode ===
The second lateral motion is an oscillatory combined roll and yaw motion called Dutch roll, perhaps because of its similarity to an ice-skating motion of the same name made by Dutch skaters; the origin of the name is unclear. The Dutch roll may be described as a yaw and roll to the right, followed by a recovery towards the equilibrium condition, then an overshooting of this condition and a yaw and roll to the left, then back past the equilibrium attitude, and so on. The period is usually on the order of 3–15 seconds, but it can vary from a few seconds for light aircraft to a minute or more for airliners. Damping is increased by large directional stability and small dihedral and decreased by small directional stability and large dihedral. Although usually stable in a normal aircraft, the motion may be so slightly damped that the effect is very unpleasant and undesirable. In swept-back wing aircraft, the Dutch roll is solved by installing a yaw damper, in effect a special-purpose automatic pilot that damps out any yawing oscillation by applying rudder corrections. Some swept-wing aircraft have an unstable Dutch roll. If the Dutch roll is very lightly damped or unstable, the yaw damper becomes a safety requirement, rather than a pilot and passenger convenience. Dual yaw dampers are required and a failed yaw damper is cause for limiting flight to low altitudes, and possibly lower Mach numbers, where the Dutch roll stability is improved.

=== Spiral divergence ===
Spiraling is inherent. Most aircraft trimmed for straight-and-level flight, if flown stick-fixed, will eventually develop a tightening spiral-dive. If a spiral dive is entered unintentionally, the result can be fatal.

A spiral dive is not a spin; it starts, not with a stall or from torque, but with a random perturbation, increasing roll and airspeed. Without prompt intervention by the pilot this can lead to structural failure of the airframe, either as a result of excess aerodynamic loading or flight into terrain. The aircraft initially gives little indication that anything has changed. The pilot's "down" sensation continues to be with respect to the bottom of the airplane, although the aircraft actually has increasingly rolled off the true vertical. Under VFR conditions, the pilot corrects for small deviations from level by automatically using the true horizon, but in IMC or dark conditions the deviations can go unnoticed: the roll will increase and the lift, no longer vertical, is insufficient to support the airplane. The nose drops and speed increases; the spiral dive has begun.

==== The forces involved ====
Say the roll is to the right. A sideslip develops, resulting in a slip-flow which is right-to-left. Now examine the resulting forces one at a time, calling any rightward influence yaw-in, leftward yaw-out, or roll-in or -out, whichever applies. The slip-flow will:

- push the fin, rudder, and other side areas aft of the plane's centre of gravity to the left, causing a right yaw-in,
- push side areas ahead of the centre of gravity to the left, causing a left yaw-out,
- push the right wingtip up, the left down, a left roll-out owing to the dihedral angle,
- cause the left wing to go faster, the right wing slower, a roll-in,
- push the side areas of the aircraft above the centre of gravity to the left, a roll-out,
- push the side areas of the aircraft below the centre of gravity to the left, a roll-in,

Also, an aerodynamic force is imposed by the relative vertical positions of the fuselage and the wings, creating a roll-in leverage if the fuselage is above the wings, as in a low wing configuration; or roll-out if below, as in a high-wing configuration.

A propeller rotating under power will influence the airflow passing it. Its effect depends on throttle setting (high at high rpm, low at low) and the attitude of the aircraft.

Thus, a spiral dive results from the netting-out of many forces depending partly on the design of the aircraft, partly on its attitude, and partly on its throttle setting (a susceptible design will spiral dive under power but may not in the glide).

==== Recovery ====
A diving aircraft has more kinetic energy (which varies as the square of speed) than when straight-and-level. To get back to straight-and-level, the recovery must get rid of this excess energy safely. The sequence is:

- power all off
- level wings to the horizon, or if horizon has been lost, to the instruments
- reduce speed using gentle back pressure on the controls until desired speed is reached
- level off, being wary of a pitch-up tendency as the aircraft is rolled to wings level, and restore power

== Fuel slosh ==
Oscillations can be caused longitudinally or laterally by fuel slosh, a phenomenon known to have affected aircraft including the Douglas A4D, Lockheed P-80, Boeing KC-135, Cessna T-37 and the North American YF-100. Its effect is minimal when the fuel tanks are full or nearly empty: a full tank has high mass but little movement, whereas a nearly empty tank has greater movement but low mass. Fuel slosh can be reduced by installing baffles in the fuel tanks, however these increase mass and reduce fuel capacity.

== See also ==
- Aircraft flight mechanics
- Visual flight
- Aeronautics
- Flight dynamics
