= Yaw damper =

Device to reduce yaw oscillations in aircraft

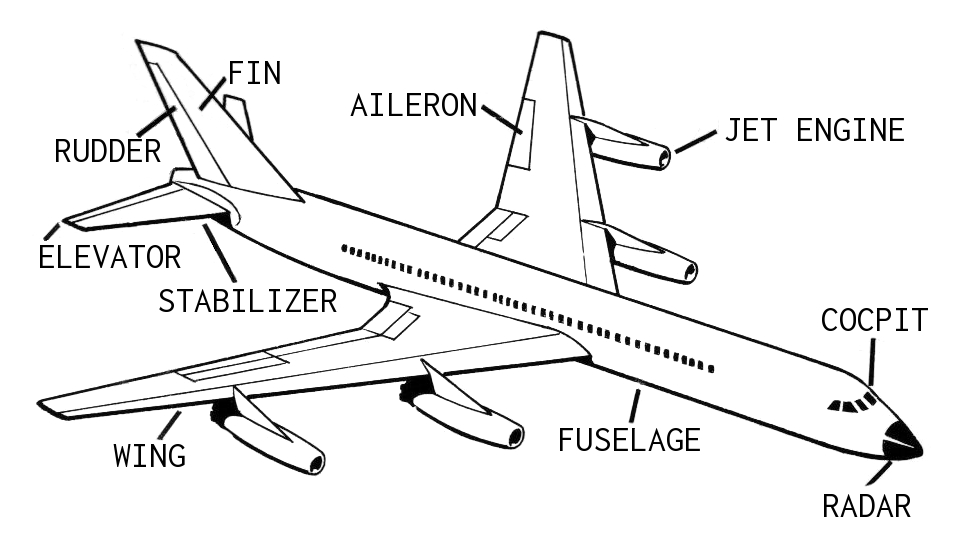
Various parts of an aircraft

A yaw damper (sometimes referred to as a stability augmentation system) is a system used to reduce (or damp) the undesirable tendency of an aircraft to oscillate in a repetitive rolling and yawing motion, a phenomenon known as the Dutch roll. A large number of modern aircraft, both jet-powered and propeller-driven, have been furnished with such systems.

The use of a yaw damper provides superior ride quality by automatically preventing uncomfortable yawing and rolling oscillations and reduces pilot workload. On some aircraft, it is mandatory for the yaw damper to be operational at all times during flight above a specified altitude; several airliners were deemed to be unsafe to fly without an active yaw damper.

== Design ==
The yaw damper system consists of accelerometers and sensors that monitor the aircraft rate of yaw; these are electronically connected to a flight computer that processes the signals and automatically controls actuators connected to the rudder. In effect, these actions are akin to movements of the rudder pedals by the pilot, except that these are automated. The rudder motions produced by the yaw damper act to calm the aircraft, assisting the flight crew in maintaining stable flight. The purpose of the yaw damper is to make an aircraft easier to fly by eliminating the necessity for the pilot to act against such tendencies. A yaw damper may remove the necessity for a pilot to make any contact with the rudder pedals during turns on a range of aircraft, including jet-powered ones. Some aircraft, such as the Boeing 727 and Vickers VC10 airliners, are fitted with multiple yaw damper systems due to their operation having been deemed critical to flight safety.

Despite what may be implied by its name, the yaw damper does not inhibit or reduce intentional (e.g. commanded by the pilot) yaw, as this would interfere with conventional turns and other common maneuvers that an aircraft would be expected to perform. Rather, the system is intended to counteract incidental and undirected yawing motions, which can be characterised as skids or slips. On a single-engine aircraft, the system is particularly useful at addressing the tendency to 'fishtail', smoothing out the left–right movements of the vertical stabilizer (fin), increasing ride comfort. It is also particularly useful on swept wing aircraft, particularly those using a T-tail arrangement; without a yaw damper system, these types of aircraft are susceptible to the Dutch roll, where yawing motions can result in repetitive corkscrew-like oscillations that could potentially escalate to excessive levels if not counteracted.

The yaw damper is typically disengaged at ground level and turned on shortly after takeoff; an active yaw damper during the takeoff run could potentially mask serious issues such as engine failure. Equally, the system is commonly disengaged prior to landing, as it could inhibit the control authority to the pilot at the critical moment of touchdown. On several modern aircraft that are outfitted with a yaw damper, these systems become engaged automatically once the aircraft has surpassed a set altitude (e.g. 200 feet); older aircraft typically have this function manually selected by the flight crew. Pilots who are used to flying aircraft with yaw dampers need to be particularly aware when flying aircraft that lack them. It has become common for such systems to be interfaced with other elements of an aircraft's avionics, enabling it to work with other functions such as the autopilot. Yaw damping can be readily simulated by software packages, such as Matlab.

== See also ==
- Flight dynamics
