= Hubometer =

Axle-mounted distance measuring device

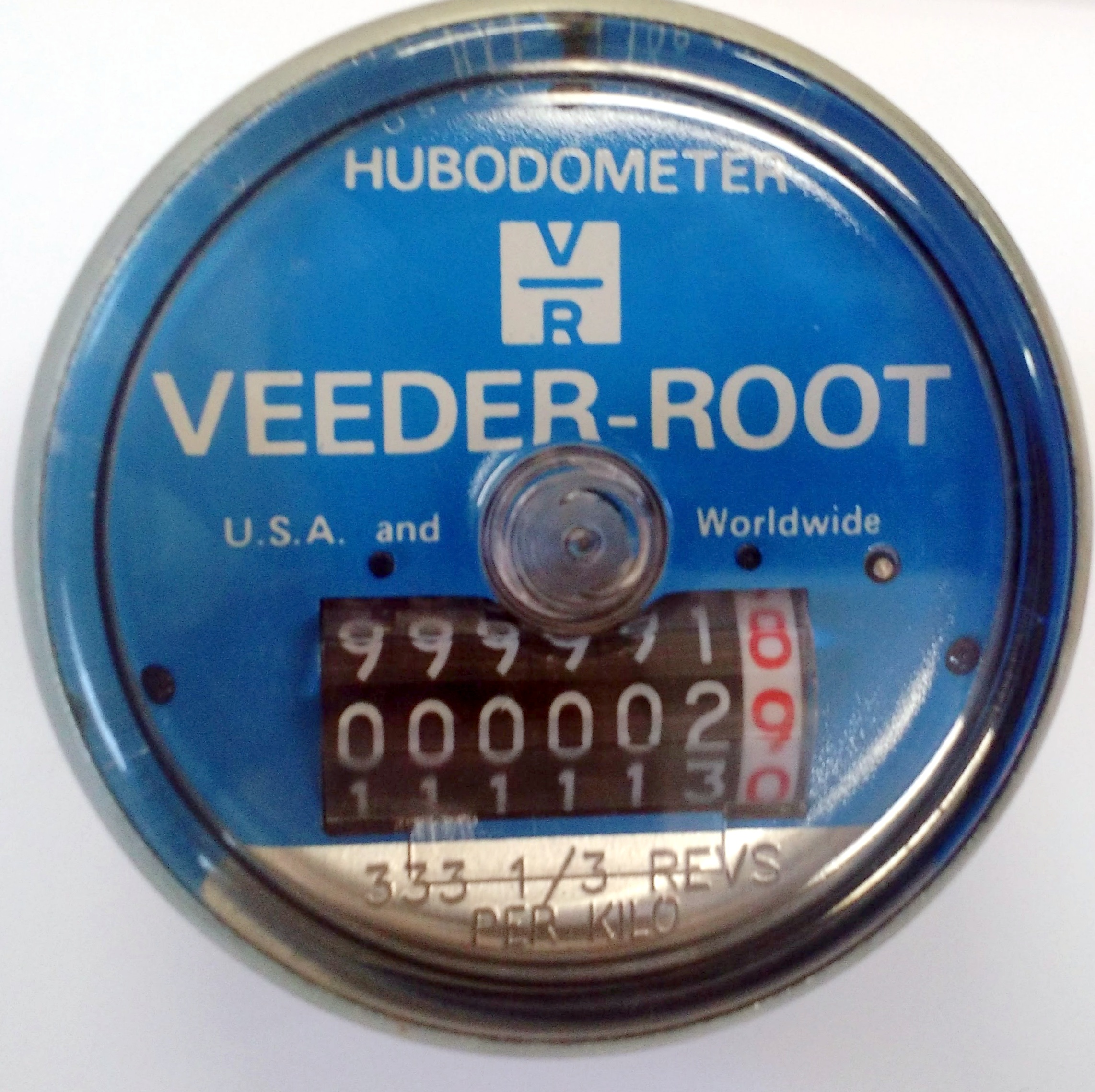
Hubodometer Veeder-Root

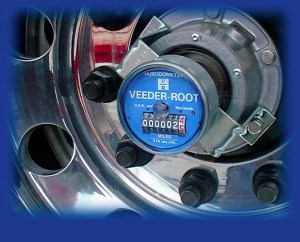
Hubodometer Veeder-Root

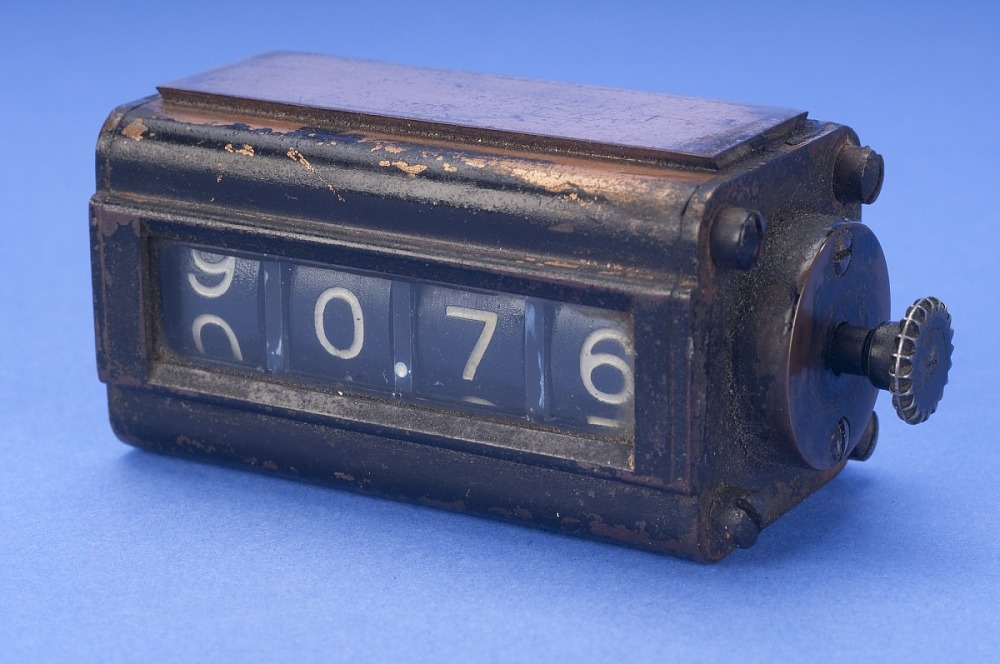
Original Veeder Counter

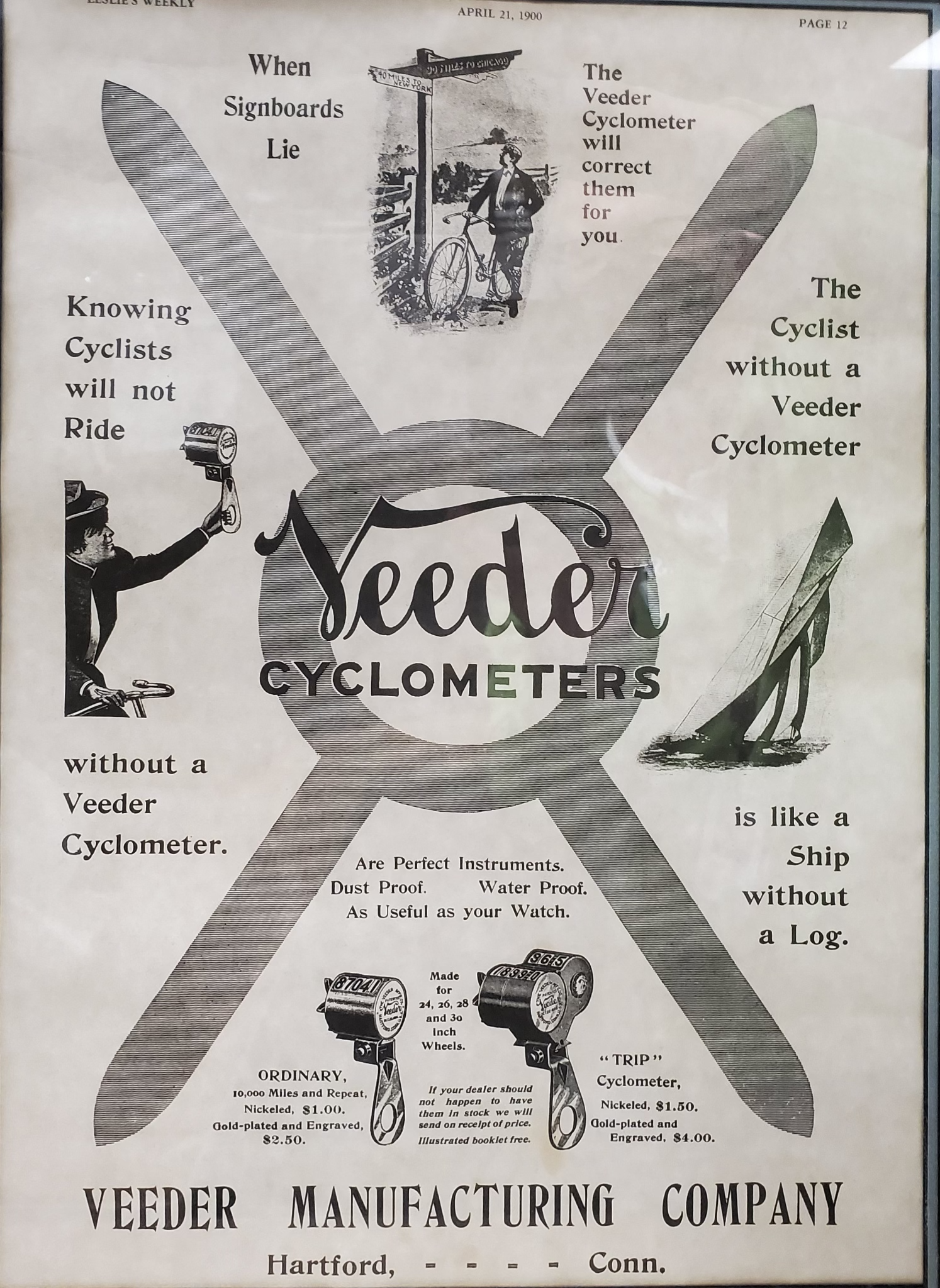
Veeder Company Cyclometer Poster 1900

A hubometer (from hub, center of a wheel; -ometer, measure of) or hubodometer, is a device mounted on the axle of any land vehicle to measure the distance traveled based on the rotations of the wheel hub.

The whole device rotates with the wheel, except for an eccentrically mounted weight on an internal shaft. The weight remains pointing downwards, and drives the counting mechanism as the body of the hubometer rotates around it.

== Typical uses ==
Hubometers are essential for semi-trailers, serving as the primary method to track the accumulated distance traveled throughout the vehicle's lifespan. They find application in buses, trucks, or trailers, particularly those whose tires are provided to the vehicle operator through an independent company under a "price per thousand kilometers" contract. In this arrangement, the tire company installs the hubometer to obtain accurate measurements of the distance covered.

In New Zealand, hubodometers are used for the calculation of road user charges for HGVs powered by a fuel not taxed at source.

== Historical data ==
At the Veeder Manufacturing Company in Hartford, Connecticut production of cyclometers, hubodometers, and other scientific tools was underway for contracts with the United States government. Designed by Curtis Veeder in 1895, the cyclometer measured the distance traveled by bicycles as Curtis was a bicycle enthusiast. He would later adapt the invention to measure distance traveled for automobiles, hubodometers, as well as hand-turned cyclometers for use by the US Weather Bureau. The Veeder Manufacturing Company would produce these tools for use by the US government during World War One. These devices would be placed on the wheel of an automobile to measure the distance traveled by counting the rotations of its wheels.

Curtis Veeder acquired the Root Company of Bristol in 1928 before retiring to form the Veeder-Root Corporation. It has remained in operation up to the present day. Utilizing his industrial riches, Veeder constructed an intricate stone mansion located on Elizabeth Street in Hartford. This mansion currently houses the Connecticut Museum of Culture and History.

== See also ==
- Odometer
- Speedometer
- Tachograph
- Tachometer
- Taximeter
- Hobbs meter
- Tach timer
