= Western Corridor =

Road in New Zealand

Christchurch Western Corridor

Route information
- Maintained by NZ Transport Agency Waka Kotahi
- Length: 16.5 km (10.3 mi)
- Existed: 2013–present

Major junctions
- North end: SH 1 (Main North Road) at Belfast
- South end: SH 1 (Main South Road) at Hornby

Location
- Country: New Zealand
- Major cities: Belfast, Harewood, Russley, Hornby

Highway system
- New Zealand state highways; Motorways and expressways; List

The Western Corridor is a road in Christchurch, New Zealand which connects the suburb of Belfast, New Zealand, in the north to Hornby in the south and connects the Canterbury region to Christchurch Airport. Most of the traffic on the corridor heads to the city, the airport, Belfast or Hornby, while 15% of traffic travels further north or south.

The route features a four-laned semi-urban grade separated and at-grade limited-access road of New Zealand State Highway 1 from The Groynes to the centre of Hornby and provides a motorway bypass of Belfast, connecting the Western Corridor directly to the Christchurch Northern Motorway.

== Route ==
The Western Corridor currently comprises, form north to south, Johns Road, Russley Road, Masham Road and Carmen Road.

== Speed limit ==
The Western Corridor has a speed limit of 80 km/h (50 mph) for most of its length. The only exceptions are the Western Belfast Bypass which has a speed limit of 100 km/h (62 mph) and the 50–60 km/h (31–37 mph) speed limited southern urban section from the Yaldhurst Road intersection to the terminus at Main South Road.

== History ==
The Western Corridor upgrade was announced by the government as a Road of National Significance in 2009. The section between Avonhead Road and Yaldhurst Road was completed in 2013. The next section to open was further north along the corridor between Sawyers Arms Road and Harewood Road creating a four-lane 80 km/h section of highway and restricting McLeans Island Road to a left in, left out intersection.

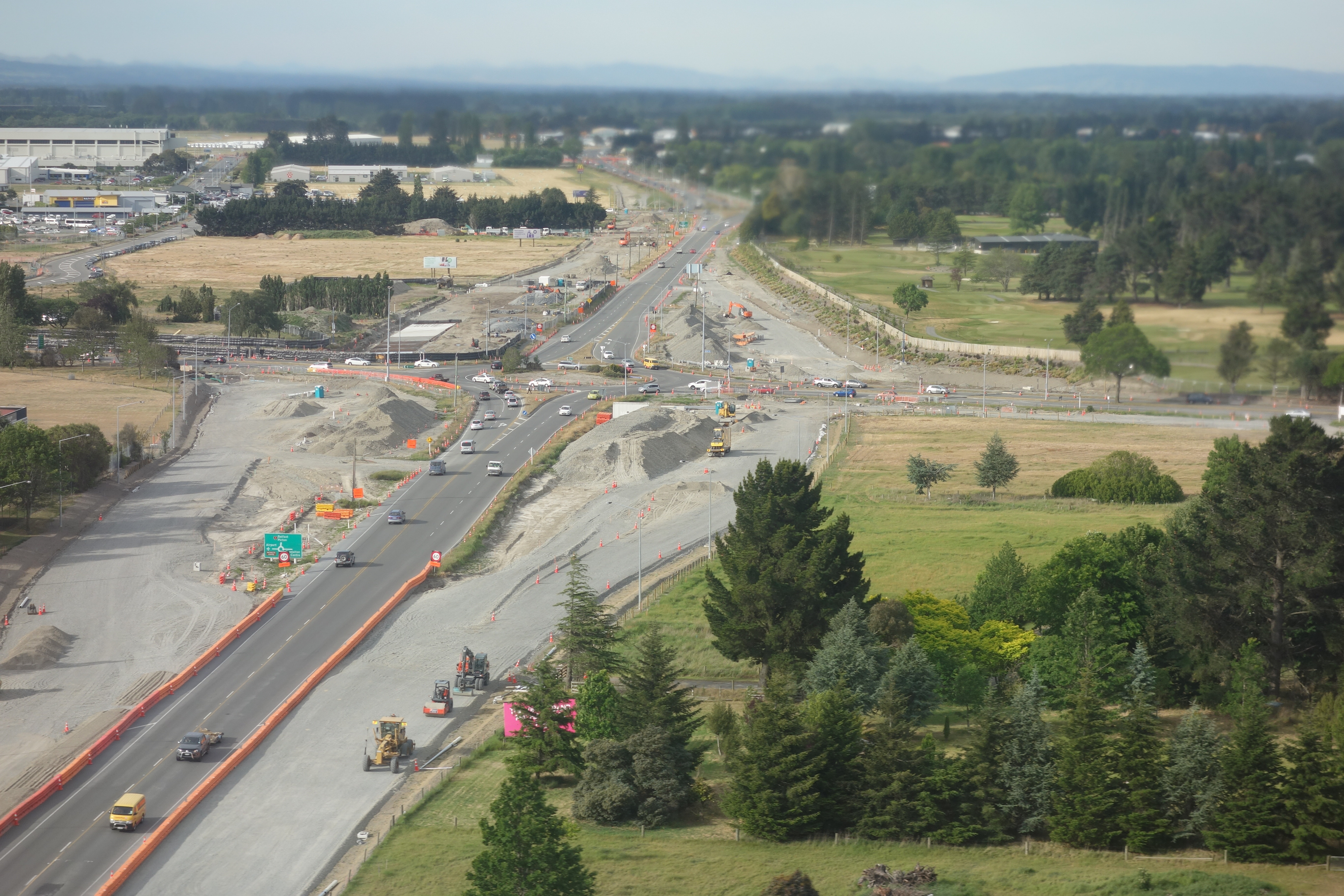
The construction of the State Highway One/Memorial Avenue overbridge, 2015. Christchurch Airport is left of the image.

== Sections of the Western Corridor ==
The Western Corridor consists of multiple sections that were fully completed near to the end of 2017. All sections are listed from north to south:

- Western Belfast Bypass – A controlled-access, four-lane median-separated motorway between the Northern Motorway and Johns Road bypassing the Belfast urban area.
- Groynes to Sawyers Arms Road – This section has been widened to four lanes and separated by a central median. Some intersections have been restricted to left in, left out and a service lane has been constructed between Wilkinsons Road and Gardiners Road.
- Sawyers Arms Road to Harewood Road – A four-laned road separated by a central median. McLeans Island Road restricted to left in, left out. Completed late 2013.
- Harewood Road to Avonhead Park – A four-laned road separated by a central median. A grade separated interchange (Memorial Avenue Gateway Bridge) has replaced the roundabout at Memorial Avenue (for Christchurch International Airport) and an additional trumpet interchange has been constructed as an extra airport access road south of Avonhead Road.
- Avonhead to Yaldhurst – A four-laned road separated by a central median. (First completed section in 2013)
- Masham/Carmen Road – Masham and Carmen roads widened four lanes with raised median between Yaldhurst and Waterloo roads. Completed in 2014.
