= State Highway 71 (New Zealand) =

Road in New Zealand

Coordinates: 44.390540°S 171.251244°E

State Highway 71

Route information
- Maintained by NZ Transport Agency
- Length: 6.4 km (4.0 mi)

Major junctions
- South end: SH 1 (Christchurch Northern Motorway) at Kaiapoi
- North end: Rangiora

Location
- Country: New Zealand

Highway system
- New Zealand state highways; Motorways and expressways; List
| ← SH 70 | → SH 73 |

State Highway 71 (SH 71) is a New Zealand state highway connecting Kaiapoi/Christchurch with Rangiora.

== Route ==
=== History ===
The highway was declared in 1992 after State Highway 72, the highway which serviced inland parts of Canterbury, was revoked (along with a number of other highways). SH 71 provided a southern connection to Rangiora from SH 1 in contrast to SH 72, which connected Rangiora to SH 1 from the east.

=== Route description ===
For the entire length of the highway, SH 71 is known as Lineside Road and parallels both the Main North Line of the South Island Main Trunk Railway and a 66 kV transmission line (between Southbrook and Kaiapoi substations) for much of the length. SH 71 can be accessed via offramps coming off SH 1 (as the Christchurch Northern Motorway). Smith Street, coming from Kaiapoi, also flows onto SH 71. Initially a northbound only exit, southbound access was provided in 2014.

Just south of Rangiora the road crosses the railway line at-grade. SH 71 officially ends after the crossing but the road continues into Rangiora.

== See also ==
- List of New Zealand state highways
