= Pilot in command =

Flight crew role

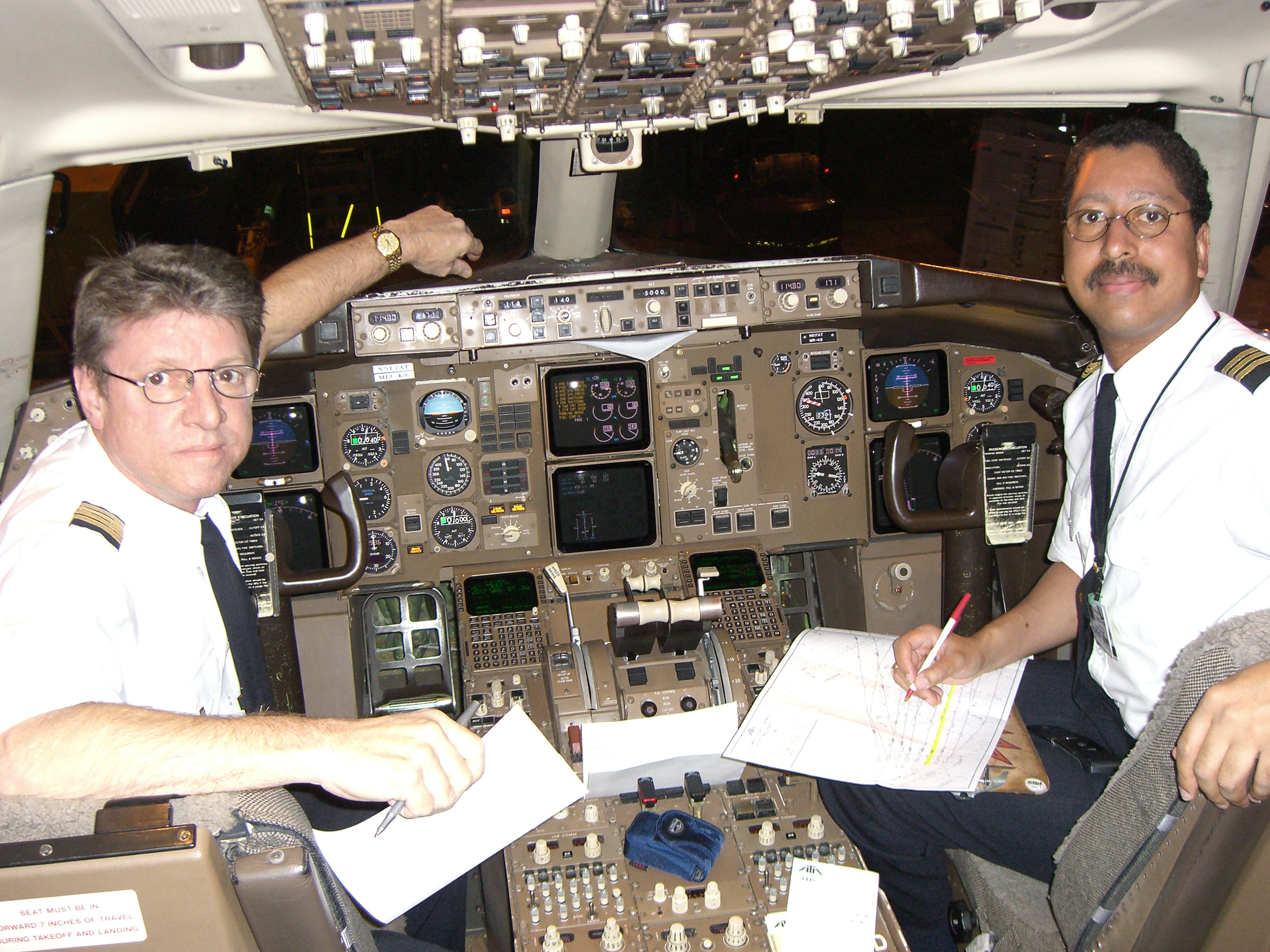
The pilot in command must hold the rank of captain, and typically sits in the left seat. The second in command can be a first officer or another captain, and will occupy the right seat. An exception exists where a captain is being trained, in which case two captains will occupy the cockpit: a training captain will be the pilot in command and will occupy the right seat.

The pilot in command (PIC) of an aircraft is the person aboard an aircraft who is ultimately responsible for its operation and safety during flight. This would be the captain in a typical two- or three-pilot aircrew, or "pilot" if there is only one certificated and qualified pilot at the controls of an aircraft. The PIC must be legally certificated (or otherwise authorized) to operate the aircraft for the specific flight and flight conditions, but need not be actually manipulating the controls at any given moment. The PIC is the person legally in charge of the aircraft and its flight safety and operation, and would normally be the primary person liable for an infraction of any flight rule.

The strict legal definition of PIC may vary slightly from country to country. The International Civil Aviation Organization (ICAO) definition is: "The pilot responsible for the operation and safety of the aircraft during flight time."

In Annex 2, "Rules of the Air", under par. "2.3.1 Responsibility of pilot-in-command", ICAO declares:

The pilot-in-command of an aircraft shall, whether manipulating the controls or not, be responsible for the operation of the aircraft in accordance with the rules of the air, except that the pilot-in-command may depart from these rules in circumstances that render such departure absolutely necessary in the interests of safety.

In Annex 2, par. "2.4 Authority of pilot-in-command of an aircraft", ICAO adds:

The pilot-in-command of an aircraft shall have final authority as to the disposition of the aircraft while in command.

ICAO Annex 2, par. 2.3.1, explicitly empowers the PIC to override any other regulation in an emergency, and to take the safest course of action at their sole discretion. This provision mirrors the authority given to the captains of ships at sea, with similar justifications. It essentially gives the PIC the final authority in any situation involving the safety of a flight, irrespective of any other law or regulation.

== Logging pilot in command time ==
Logging flight time as a PIC is distinct from acting as the legal PIC of a flight. The PIC of a given flight may always log their flying time as such. Other crew members may or may not be authorized to log their time on that flight as PIC time, depending on the specific circumstances and the controlling jurisdiction.

Time logged as "student pilot in command" (SPIC) can sometimes be partly used towards the hour requirements for the issue of a commercial pilot licence (CPL). In European Union Aviation Safety Agency (EASA) states, SPIC time means "a student pilot acting as pilot-in-command on a flight with an instructor where the latter will only observe the student pilot and shall not influence or control the flight of the aircraft." It is logged in the pilot's logbook as PIC but must be countersigned by the flight instructor. SPIC time may be partially used by the holder of a multi-crew pilot licence towards the issuance of a CPL.

Time logged as "pilot-in-command under supervision" (PICUS) may be partly used towards the hour requirements for the issue of an airline transport pilot licence (ATPL). In EASA states, a pilot-in-command under supervision means "a co-pilot performing, under the supervision of the pilot-in-command, the duties and functions of a pilot-in-command." PICUS time is logged as PIC as long as "the intervention of the PIC in the interest of safety was not required", but must be countersigned by the PIC.

== See also ==
- Aircrew (flight crew)
- Sea captain
- Pilot flying
- Pilot logbook
