= Christchurch Northern Motorway =

Road in Christchurch, New Zealand

Christchurch Northern Motorway

Route information
- Length: 16 km (9.9 mi)
- Existed: 16 October 1967–present
- Component highways: State Highway 1, State Highway 74

Major junctions
- From: Woodend
- State Highway 71 at Lineside Road
- To: St Albans

Location
- Country: New Zealand
- Major cities: Kaiapoi, Belfast, St Albans

Highway system
- New Zealand state highways; Motorways and expressways; List

The Christchurch Northern Motorway is the main northern route into and out of Christchurch, New Zealand. The motorway forms part of State Highway 1 (SH 1) and State Highway 74 (SH 74).

The motorway, which heads in a northerly direction, is approximately 16.5 km in length. It links the suburb of St Albans with Pineacres, south of Woodend, bypassing the outer suburban areas of Northcote, Redwood, Belfast, and Kaiapoi. At its southern end, it connects with Queen Elizabeth II Drive (QEII Drive) where SH 74 continues east as an expressway, and links south to Cranford Street from where vehicles can access Central Christchurch.

== Route ==
The Christchurch Northern Motorway begins in the suburb of St Albans at a roundabout intersection with Cranford Street, approximately six kilometres north of Central Christchurch. The initial one kilometre section links to the official start of the motorway at a full diamond interchange with Queen Elizabeth II Drive where it becomes SH 74. The motorway continues north for several kilometres to the east of Northcote, Redwood, Northwood, and Belfast. Prestons and Radcliffe roads pass over the motorway, and there is a half diamond interchange (south facing) at Belfast Road. This section of the motorway is called the Christchurch Northern Corridor.

The motorway then passes over the Main North Line and Main North Road shortly before a large interchange at Chaneys, north of Belfast. Here, the motorway merges with the Western Belfast Bypass motorway, which forms part of an expressway to the west of the city known as the Western Corridor and becomes SH 1. There are also connections to and from Main North Road at the southern end of the interchange (facing south only), and a single southbound off ramp at the northern end of the interchange. This section of the motorway incorporates a southbound peak hours only T2 transit lane.

The motorway then passes over the Waimakariri River. This short section of the motorway is six lanes wide to Tram Road interchange, and the bridge incorporates cycling and walking connections. From there, the motorway runs to the west of Kaiapoi with interchanges at Ohoka Road, and Lineside Road, providing access to Kaiapoi, and Rangiora via State Highway 71, respectively.

From the Lineside Road interchange, the motorway reduces to two lanes (one in each direction) and is undivided for the last 3 km of its length. The motorway officially ends at Pineacres, where it intersects with Main North Road again.

== History ==
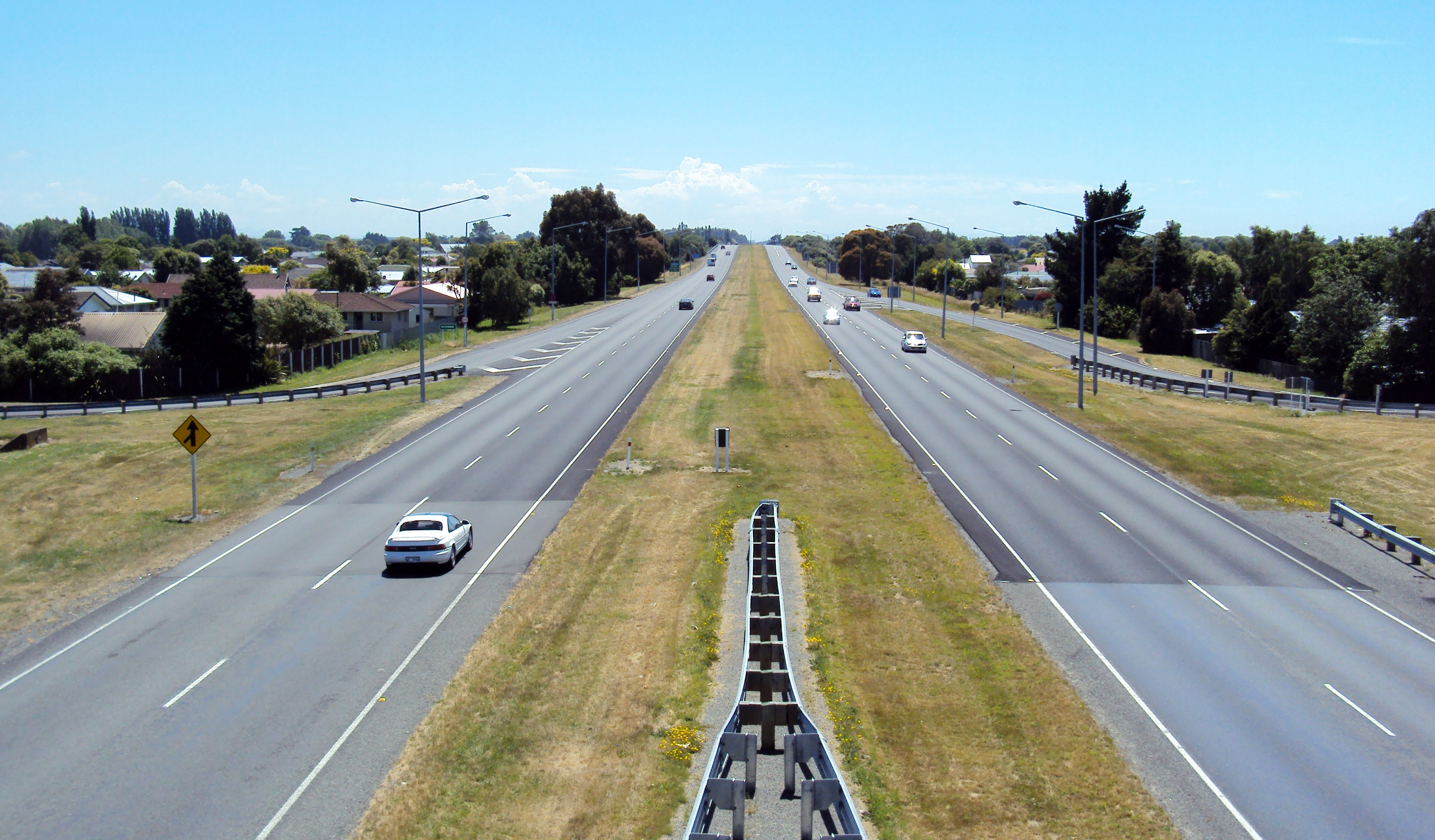
Looking north from the Ohoka Road Interchange.

Plans for a motorway network in Christchurch were first revealed in 1962, with the release of the Christchurch Master Transportation Plan. Under this original plan the Northern Motorway was to run south from Chaneys (where it would link with other plans for the motorway heading further north), to the east of Belfast and Redwood and through Mairehau, St Albans and Central Christchurch, to connect with the planned Christchurch Southern Motorway at Waltham. Significant on and off ramp complexes were planned where the motorway passed through the central city, and a large three-way interchange with flyovers was planned in Waltham to connect with the Christchurch Southern Motorway and to a planned expressway to Opawa.

The first section of the Northern Motorway opened on 17 October 1967. The initial section ran from Main North Road at Dickeys Road to Tram Road, with northbound lanes continuing as far as Neeves Road. The section from Tram Road to Pineacres, bypassing Kaiapoi, opened on 17 December 1970. This was not part of the Christchurch Master Transportation Plan, but was designed to link into these plans further to the south. Plans for extending the motorway towards the city were scaled back in 1975 so that the Christchurch Northern Motorway would terminate at the northern edge of the central city at Bealey Avenue. In the mid-1990s, the motorway designation through St Albans was removed, with the planned extension now terminating at Queen Elizabeth II Drive.

A $4.6 million project to add new north facing on and off ramps to the Lineside Road interchange, to increase motorway accessibility north from Kaiapoi and relieve the dangerous Pineacres intersection, was completed in 2014.

Beginning in 2015, the Western Belfast Bypass motorway was constructed as part of the Christchurch Western Corridor (forming SH 1) in order to remove traffic from the suburb of Belfast, New Zealand. A direct link between the Western Belfast bypass and Christchurch Northern Motorway was constructed at Chaneys, allowing north–south traffic not bound for the city to bypass the busy Main North Road. This project was completed in November 2017.

As part of the New Zealand Roads of National Significance Programme, the Christchurch Northern Motorway was extended from Chaneys interchange to an interchange at QEII Drive, with a local road continuing on to Cranford Street at Innes Road. This bypassed Main North Road through Belfast, Northwood, Redwood and Northcote to terminate at QEII Drive with a full diamond interchange. An off-road cycleway was also completed between QEII Drive and Belfast Road. A contract was awarded in August 2016 for the $240 million motorway extension project. Construction commenced in October 2016, with the new section of motorway opening in December 2020. This extended the length of the motorway to approximately 16.5 km. Cranford Street was upgraded to four lanes from the new motorway terminus to the Innes Road intersection as a Christchurch City Council delivered project. QEII Drive was widened to four lanes between Main North Road and Marshland Road as part of this project.

Projected congestion issues saw late changes to the motorway project, including the implementation of a T2 Transit lane southbound on the inner motorway lane, and changes to local roads in St Albans to discourage rat running, and encourage public transport uptake.

== Future ==
The Woodend Bypass (officially called the SH1 Belfast to Pegasus Motorway and Woodend Bypass) is an 11 km approved extension of the Northern Motorway from its current terminus at Pineacres to the Pegasus Roundabout (SH 1). Strengthening and widening of the bridge over Kaiapoi River and a bridge replacement over Cam River / Ruataniwha will be carried out. The motorway will then pass to the east of Woodend and to the west of Pegasus, with a grade-separated interchange at Williams Street (the current terminus of the motorway and the northern access point for the motorway to Kaiapoi). Woodend Beach Road and Gladstone Road will have their own overbridge) before a second grade-separated interchange at the Pegasus Roundabout.The existing section of motorway between the Lineside Road interchange and Pineacres would be duplicated to four lanes. SH1 approaching Woodend currently carries around 21,500 vehicles a day, including around 9% freight traffic. Traffic volumes were expected to grow to around 28,000 vehicles a day by 2048.

In 2025, the NZTA board approved $127 million for the detailed design, property acquisition, and early works for the extension.

In 2026, early works began with embankment building of the quarry lakes at the Pineacres. On 9 July 2026, NZTA and Transport Minister Chris Bishop announced that funding for the main construction phase was not yet available, but remains a government commitment. This was due to available funding in the Major Transport Projects Pipeline (MTPP), with the next round of funding commencing in 2027. On 29 July 2026, the extension was granted Fast-track approval.

== Major junctions ==
Territorial authority	Location	km	Destinations	Notes
Waimakariri District	Pineacres		SH 1 north (Main North Road) – Picton (Williams Street) – Pineacres, Kaiapoi	Christchurch Northern Motorway begins
Waimakariri District	Kaiapoi		SH 71 (Lineside Road) – Rangiora; Smith Street – Kaiapoi	Full interchange
Waimakariri District	Kaiapoi		Ohoka Road – Kaiapoi, Rangiora	Full interchange (Northbound entrance using Cosgrove Road)
Waimakariri District	Kaiapoi		Tram Road – Ohoka, Oxford	Northbound exit and southbound entrance
Waimakariri District	Kaiapoi	327.0	Waimakariri River	
Christchurch City	Chaneys		Main North Road – Kainga, Christchurch via Marshland	Southbound exit and northbound entrance
Christchurch City	Chaneys		SH 74 south (Christchurch Northern Corridor)	Southbound exit and northbound entrance
Christchurch City	Belfast		SH 1 south (Western Belfast Bypass)	Southbound exit and northbound entrance
Christchurch City	Belfast		Main North Road (north) – Kainga, Chaneys; Main North Road (south) – Belfast, City Centre; Dickeys Road – Coutts Island	Christchurch Northern Motorway ends
