= Western Belfast Bypass =

Bypass in Christchurch, New Zealand

Western Belfast Bypass

Route information
- Maintained by NZ Transport Agency
- Length: 5 km (3.1 mi)
- Existed: November 2017–present

Major junctions
- From: SH 1 (Christchurch Northern Motorway) at Belfast
- To: Johns Road/Clearwater Avenue at Northwood

Location
- Country: New Zealand

Highway system
- New Zealand state highways; Motorways and expressways; List

The Western Belfast Bypass is an approximately five-kilometre-long (3.1 mi), four lane, grade separated motorway recently built to bypass the northern Christchurch suburb of Belfast, New Zealand. It is estimated that its construction will result in 17,000 fewer vehicles using Main North Road through Belfast, and shorten travel times between the north and west of Christchurch. In addition, the motorway will allow for improved public transport, cycling, and pedestrian options on Main North Road. It is expected that 21,500 vehicles per day will use the WBB motorway by 2026. The speed limit along the route is 100 km/h.

== Route ==
The motorway links directly from the Christchurch Northern Motorway, at Chaneys interchange, to Johns Road at the Clearwater roundabout, bypassing the current section of State Highway One through the Belfast urban area. It forms part of the Christchurch Western Corridor, which is one of the Roads of National Significance projects previously announced by the Government in 2009.

== Planning and construction ==
A northbound off-ramp and southbound on-ramp is provided at Groynes Road. The existing section of SH1 along Johns Road from The Groynes to Sawyers Arms Road is being upgraded to a four lane median divided highway, with restricted access intersections, as part of the Christchurch Western Corridor programme. The contract was awarded to Fulton Hogan. Construction began on May 8, 2015 with the first sod turned by Minister of Transport Simon Bridges, and was opened in stages in November 2017.
