= Flight time =

Aviation term

Flight time or block time is an aviation term referring to the total amount of time spent piloting aircraft, and serves as the primary measure of a pilot's experience. Flight time is defined by International Civil Aviation Organization (ICAO) as "The total time from the moment an aeroplane first moves for the purpose of taking off until the moment it finally comes to rest at the end of the flight", and thus includes time spent taxiing and performing pre-flight checks on the ground, provided the engine is running. It is colloquially referred to as "blocks to blocks" or "chocks to chocks" time. In commercial aviation, this means the time from pushing back at the departure gate to arriving at the destination gate.

Air time is defined as "the time from the moment an aircraft leaves the surface until it comes into contact with the surface at the next point of landing".

For gliders without self-launch capability, flight time "commences when the glider is towed for the purpose of flight and ends when the glider comes to rest after landing."

For helicopters, ICAO defines "flight time" as "The total time from the moment a helicopter's rotor blades start turning until the moment the helicopter finally comes to rest at the end of a flight and the rotor blades are stopped."

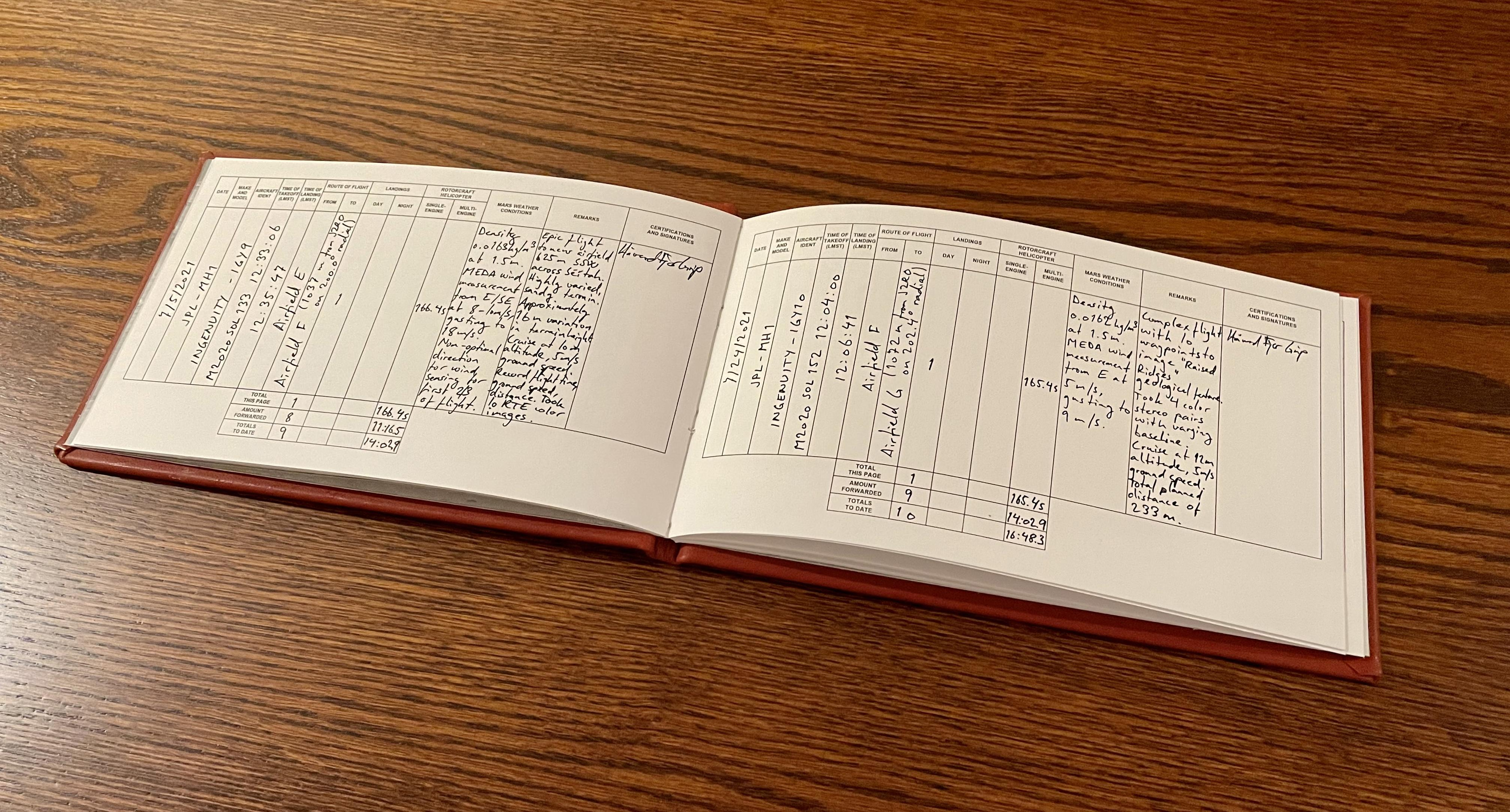
Pictured is the official mission logbook for the Ingenuity Mars Helicopter

== Recording flight time ==
Most government licensing regulations have specific flight hour requirements, as do virtually all airline job listings. Consequently, all pilots maintain a logbook, which is a legal document. In commercial aviation, flight time is recorded to the nearest minute. In general aviation it is often rounded to the nearest 5 minutes or recorded in decimal rounded to the nearest 0.1 hour, which corresponds to the resolution of a typical Hobbs meter, an odometer-like instrument installed in most light aircraft. Pilots record many details about their flight time, such as whether a flight occurred during the day or at night, in a single- or multi-engine aircraft, in visual or instrument conditions, and the pilot's role during the flight.

== Limitations ==
In European Union Aviation Safety Agency states, flight time per crew member may not exceed:

- 100 hours in any 28 consecutive days
- 900 hours in any calendar year
- 1000 hours in any 12 consecutive calendar months.

Professional pilots also have maximum duty times, and minimum rest times.

In the United States, the Federal Aviation Administration imposes different flight time limits for each type of air carrier operations. For passenger operations governed by Part 121 of the Federal Aviation Regulations (FAR), the limits are found in Part 117 of the FAR. As defined in Part 117, the daily flight time limits are extremely complex. The regulations take into account the ability of airlines to rotate crew members operating airliners through a crew rest compartment to get adequate rest on long-haul flights (which the FAA calls "augmented operations"). They also take into account that an airline might schedule a particular set of crew members to operate multiple short-haul flights (flight segments) with the same aircraft on a single day, without any opportunity to sleep during those flights (which the FAA calls "unaugmented operations").

Within Part 117, Section 117.23 imposes maximum cumulative limitations on flight time as follows:

- 100 hours in any 672 consecutive hours or
- 1,000 hours in any 365 consecutive calendar day period.

== Legal decisions ==
In the United States, time spent de-icing between taxi and takeoff is considered flight time, even if the engines are shut down. If an aircraft becomes unserviceable during taxi, and a replacement aircraft is used, time spent taxiing the first aircraft is still included in the total flight time.

== See also ==
- Flight length
- Endurance (aeronautics)
- Pilot licensing and certification
