= Roads of National Significance =

Programme of major transport projects in New Zealand

Roads of National Significance (RoNS)
- Type of project: Transport Programme
- Owner: NZ Transport Agency
- Country: New Zealand
- Launched: 20 March 2009; 17 years ago
- Funding: $11 billion NZD (2009–2017)
- Website: nzta.govt.nz/planning-and-investment/roads-of-national-significance/

Roads of National Significance (RoNS) is a programme of major transport projects aimed at improving key transport corridors to enhance economic growth, productivity, and road safety in New Zealand. The programme was first introduced in 2009 until 2017 by the Fifth National Government, and reintroduced by the Sixth National Government in 2024.

== History ==
=== Fifth National Government, 2009–2017 ===
RoNS were first announced on 20 March 2009 by Transport Minister, Steven Joyce, saying they were, "singled out as essential routes that require priority treatment". They were described as "routes that are critical to improving economic productivity and growth. . . The focus is on moving people and freight between and within these centres more safely and efficiently". Later in 2009, Prime Minister John Key, announced $11 billion in new State Highway investment over the coming decade, saying National wants to significantly improve our road network and help unclog New Zealand's growth arteries.

Between 2012 and 2015 petrol taxes and road user charges rose 9 cents a litre to pay for RoNS. The proportion of the transport budget for new and improved state highways rose from 23.4% in 2009/2010, to 61.8% in 2011/2012. Funding for other transport, such as repairs and footpaths, fell by 26.1%. In 2013 that led to the Auditor General reporting a risk that prioritising RoNS created pressures on other road maintenance. From 2015 to 2020 average seal age rose from 6.86 to 7.96 years and average remaining seal life dropped from 2.18 to 1.23 years.

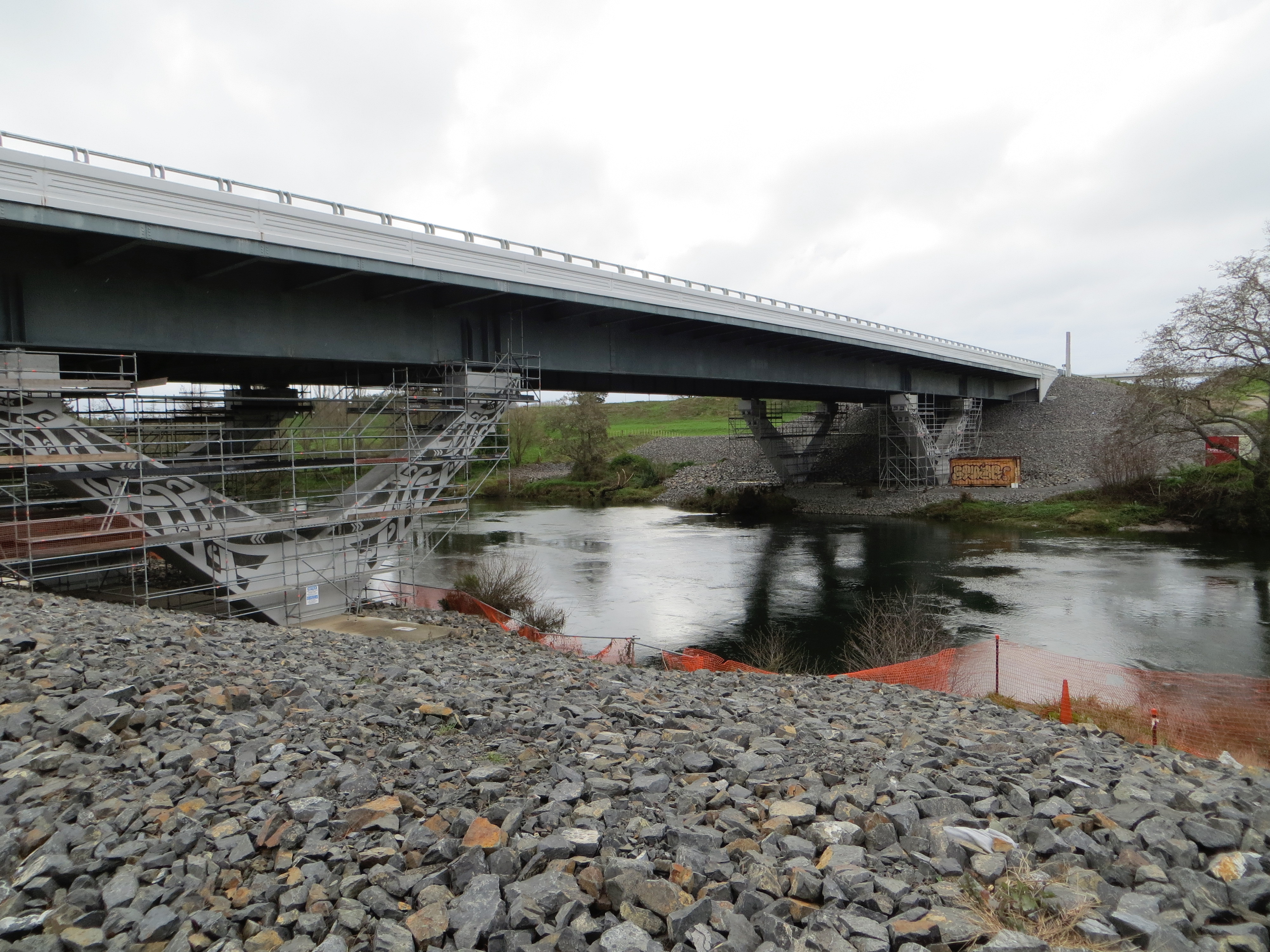
Te Rehu O Waikato Bridge being completed in 2014 on the Waikato Expressway

The seven RoNS projects were:

- Puhoi to Wellsford – SH1
- Completion of the Auckland Western Ring Route – SH20/16/18
- Auckland Victoria Park bottleneck – SH1
- Waikato Expressway – SH1
- Tauranga Eastern Corridor – SH2
- Wellington Northern Corridor (Levin to Wellington) – SH1
- Christchurch motorway projects

The effectiveness of RoNS has been queried, though Christchurch's motorways were largely open by the end of September 2020. Central Wellington sections were never started due to rejection of the Basin Reserve flyover by a Board of Inquiry in 2014, though $12m was spent on design and consenting. RoNS have also been criticised on grounds of safety, economic growth, urban planning, congestion and emissions.

There have also been defects in construction, which have required costly repairs and led to questions over how contracts were awarded.

Some of the RoNS had low cost benefit ratios. In a written answer in 2017, the Minister of Transport, Simon Bridges, said the Warkworth to Wellsford motorway would return a benefit of 25 cents for every dollar spent.

The state of RoNS schemes is set out below –

RoNS	route chosen	started	completed	cost $m	length km
Puhoi to Warkworth	2012	2016	2023	880	18.5
Warkworth to Wellsford	2017			1,900	27
Western Ring Route				2,400	16
Waterview Tunnels		2013	2017	1,700	4.5
Lincoln Rd to Westgate		2016	2019		
Victoria Park tunnel		2009	2012	340	0.5
Waikato Expressway				2,200	84
Longswamp		2016	2019	96	6
Rangiriri		2013	2017	131	5
Huntly		2016	2020	458	15
Ngāruawāhia			2013	160	7
Te Rapa			2012	172	10
Hamilton		2016	2022	973	22
Cambridge			2015	218	16
Tauranga Eastern Link		2010	2015	455	21
Wellington Northern Corridor					
Otaki to Levin		~2025	~2030	1,500	24
Peka Peka to Otaki		2017	2022	445	13
Mackays to Peka Peka		2013	2017	630	18
Transmission Gully		2014	2022	1,250	27
Christchurch Motorway					
Christchurch Northern Corridor		2016	2021	240	7
Western Belfast Bypass		2015	2017	122	5
Russley Road		2015	2018	112	
Addington to Prebbleton		2010	2012	140	10.5
Prebbleton to Rolleston		2016	2020	195	13

The total cost of RONS projects that are either complete, or under construction, is $9.6 billion, including Auckland's Northern Corridor project. That provides for around 250 kilometres of new or significantly upgraded roads at an average cost of around $35 million per kilometre.

=== Sixth Labour Government, 2020–2023 ===
On 29 January 2020 Prime Minister Jacinda Ardern, announced the Sixth Labour Government's $12 billion New Zealand Upgrade Programme. National Party leader, Simon Bridges, claimed the coalition government had just picked up where National left off. The Labour Party claims that, "National's wish list was never funded, was never part of the Budget, and their projects failed to plan for the future. We've taken transport projects that were on NZTA's plan, and they've been improved by including elements such as walking and cycling infrastructure, bus lanes and safety improvements". NZTA give ambiguous messaging. They say that, in developing four-lane corridors, they will investigate opportunities to use two lanes for public transport services, vehicles carrying multiple people, and possibly freight and that all projects will have separate walking and cycling provision, with a focus on getting people out of cars and providing safer, more efficient travel choices, as well as extra vehicle capacity. NZUP includes former RoNS plans (Whangārei to Port Marsden, Tauranga Northern Link, Te Puna to Omokoroa and Otaki to north of Levin), though it also includes $1.6 billion of spending on transport alternatives.

=== Sixth National, 2023–present ===
On 2 September 2024, Transport Minister Simeon Brown unveiled the Government's National Land Transport Programme, which seeks to invest NZ$32.9 billion over the next three years, including in early works for some of the 17 "Roads of National Significance". On 5 October 2024, Brown announced a NZ$226 million roads and highways resilience package to reduce the impact of severe weather events.
