= Road user charges (New Zealand) =

Tax paid by users of vehicles

Road user charges (RUC) are a tax paid by users of vehicles which use energy that is not taxed at its source (e.g., fuel tax).

== Taxed fuels ==
Vehicles powered by petrol, compressed natural gas (CNG), and liquefied petroleum gas (LPG) generally do not pay RUC as these fuels are taxed at source. In New Zealand, other vehicles such as light diesel vehicles or trucks do pay RUC. Most large vehicles fall into this category.

== Taxed vehicles ==
Vehicles required to pay RUC include:

- Vehicles that have a manufacturer's gross laden weight of 3,500 kg (7,716 lb) or more
- Vehicles that use diesel or other fuel not taxed at source

== Payment ==
Charges are payable to the NZ Transport agency enforced by NZ police so all road users must ensure you have the correct documents displayed at all times in order to avoid a fine. There are several exemptions available for certain types of vehicles such as tractors however the vast majority of larger vehicles will be required to pay RUC.

Details on payment can be found on the New Zealand Transport Agency Website. http://www.nzta.govt.nz/vehicle/registration-licensing/ruc/overview.html

== History ==
Roads were funded by Highway Boards and other local authorities out of rates and a mix of charges until the Main Highways Act 1922 took effect in 1924, when taxes on petrol, tyres, car registrations, and a heavy traffic fee were collected by government and spent by the Main Highways Board. A mileage tax was introduced by section 19 of the Finance Act, 1932-33 (No. 2) to collect income from diesel, steam and electric vehicles. In 1949, mileage tax collected £37,300, out of total motor taxation of £9,141,400. In 1978, it collected $9.112m out of a total of $139.365m. Under the Road User Charges Act 1977, RUCs replaced heavy traffic fees and mileage tax in stages between 28 February 1978 and 1 January 1979, requiring hubodometers to be fitted to all vehicles over 3.5 tonnes. Sales tax on heavy vehicles was also reduced from 40% to 10% until 1 April 1980. The changes aimed to make the user pay, but the effect was minimal. In 1977, of total roading costs, road users paid 55%, ratepayers 34% and taxpayers 11%. In 1980, after the introduction of RUC, road users paid 54%, ratepayers 36% and taxpayers 9%.
