= Tach timer =

Instrument used in aviation

The tach(ometer) timer is an instrument used in aviation to accumulate the total number of revolutions performed by the engine. The unit of measure is equivalent to the number of hours of running at a certain, specific reference speed of rotation. If the reference speed of rotation is 2400 RPM then the timer runs in real time when the engine is running at 2400 RPM, half speed while the engine is run at 1200 RPM (a fast idle for some aviation engines) or at 5/6ths real time at 2000 RPM (a slow cruise speed). The tach timer integrates over time the instantaneous rotation speed displayed by the tachometer. The displayed number is incremented by one if the engine is run at its reference speed for one hour. The quantity recorded is referred to as tach(ometer) hours. If the reference rotation speed is 2400 RPM then the tach timer records

$$\frac{\text{total}\ \text{revolutions}}{2400\cdot 60}$$

== Uses ==
The tach timer is usually used to schedule engine maintenance, although it is just an approximation of "Time in service" which is used to time and schedule aircraft maintenance. Time in service is defined in 14 CFR 1.1 as the actual time in the air, whereas tach time measures engine revolutions, which would still count time on the ground while the engine is idling (at a lower rate).
It can also be used as a basis for charging for aircraft rental as opposed to charging for elapsed time. This encourages the renter to properly warm the engine before takeoff and not to run the engine continuously at maximum speed.

== See also ==
- Hobbs meter
