= Pilot logbook =

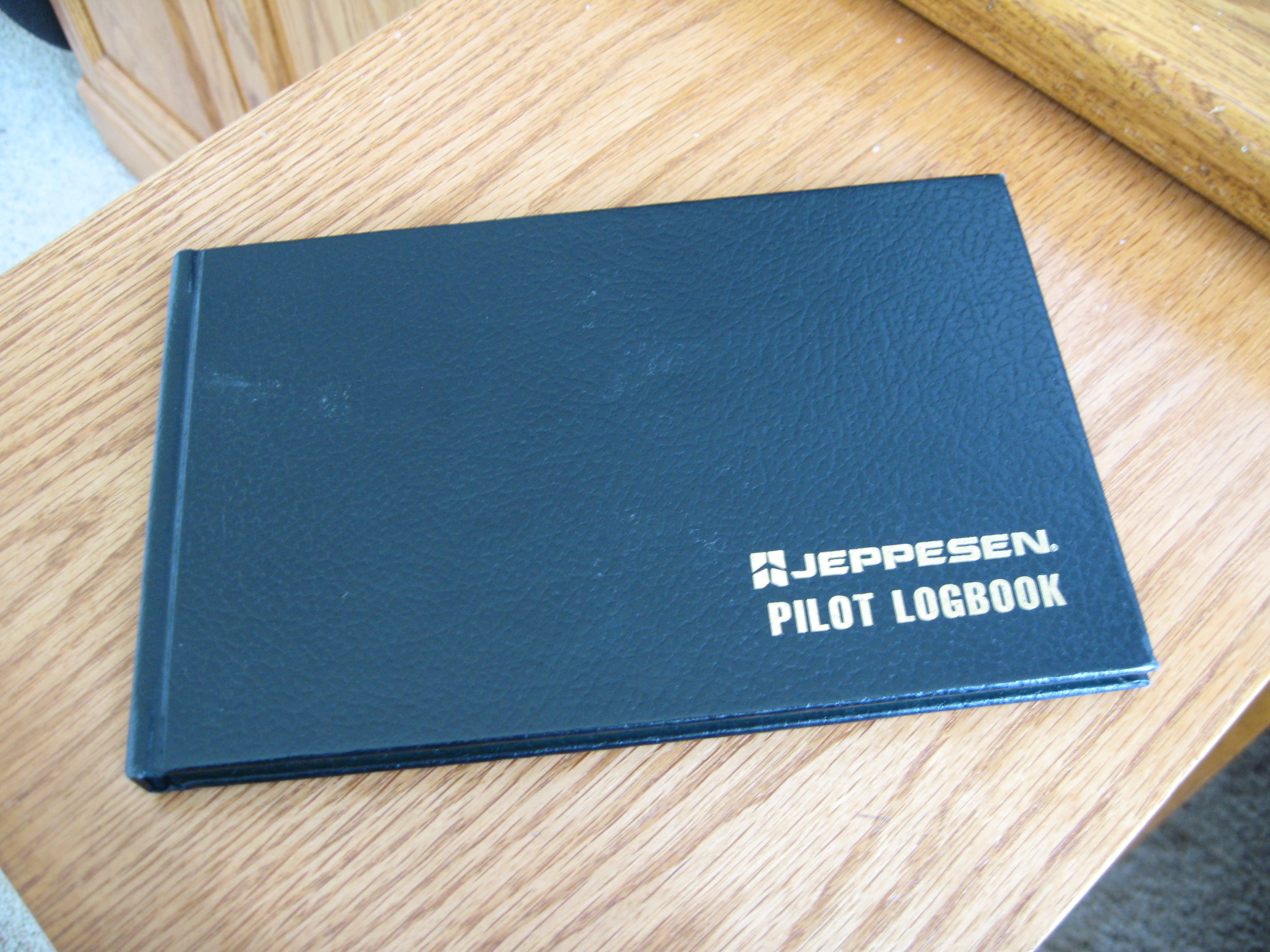
An aircraft pilot's logbook

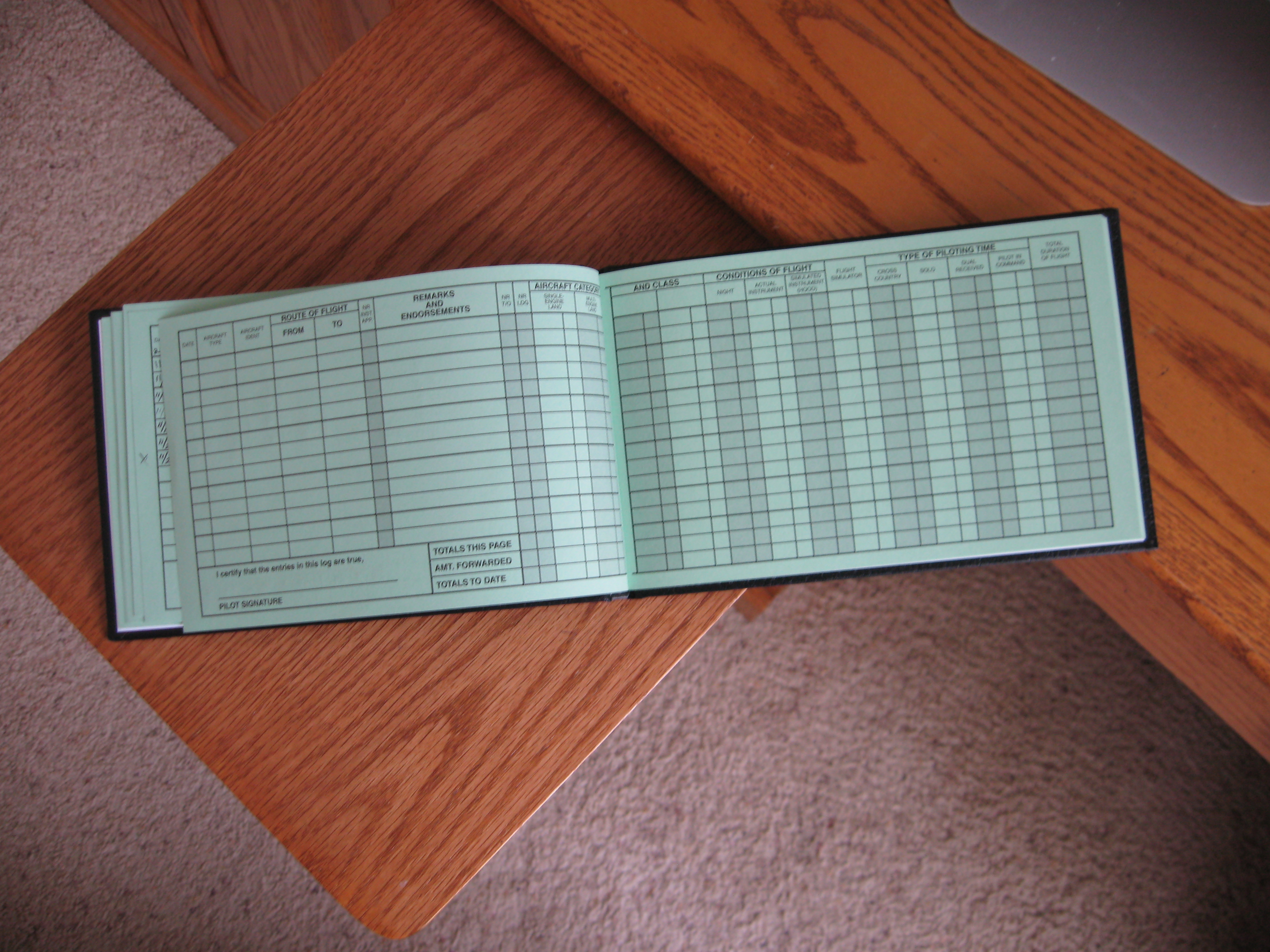
Typical page layout in aircraft pilot's logbook

A pilot logbook is a record of a pilot's flying hours. It contains every flight a pilot has flown, including flight time, number of landings, and types of instrument approaches made. Pilots also log simulator time, as it counts towards training.

In most countries, pilots are required to maintain a logbook, per their government's aviation regulations. The primary purpose is to show that certain requirements have been met for a certificate or rating, and for currency purposes.

Time logged is block time, which includes time spent taxiing, not just time in the air.

== Flight logging requirements by country ==
=== Australia ===
In Australia, pilot logbooks must be retained for seven years after the last entry.

=== European Union ===
The European Aviation Safety Agency (EASA) provides a sample logbook format in which all flights should be logged. Information to be logged includes location and time of departure and arrival, the aircraft registration, the aircraft make, model and variant, the name of the pilot in command, whether the flight was single-pilot or multi-pilot, and for single-pilot flights whether the aircraft was single-engine or multi-engine. Time in a flight simulator (FSTD) is also logged.

In addition to the requirements of Part-FCL.050, whether a flight was cross-country should also be logged for the issue of an airline transport pilot licence (ATPL).

==== Ireland ====
In Ireland, electronic logbooks are not acceptable for the issue of an ATPL. All PICUS (pilot in command under supervision) entries must be countersigned by the pilot in command, including the PIC's licence number; electronic signatures are not acceptable. Time recorded as PICUS but not signed off may not be used at all. All time under instruction must be countersigned by the instructor.

=== United Kingdom ===
In the United Kingdom, personal logbooks must be retained for at least 2 years after the date of the last entry.

Safety pilot hours may not be logged as flight time, but may be logged separately.

=== United States ===
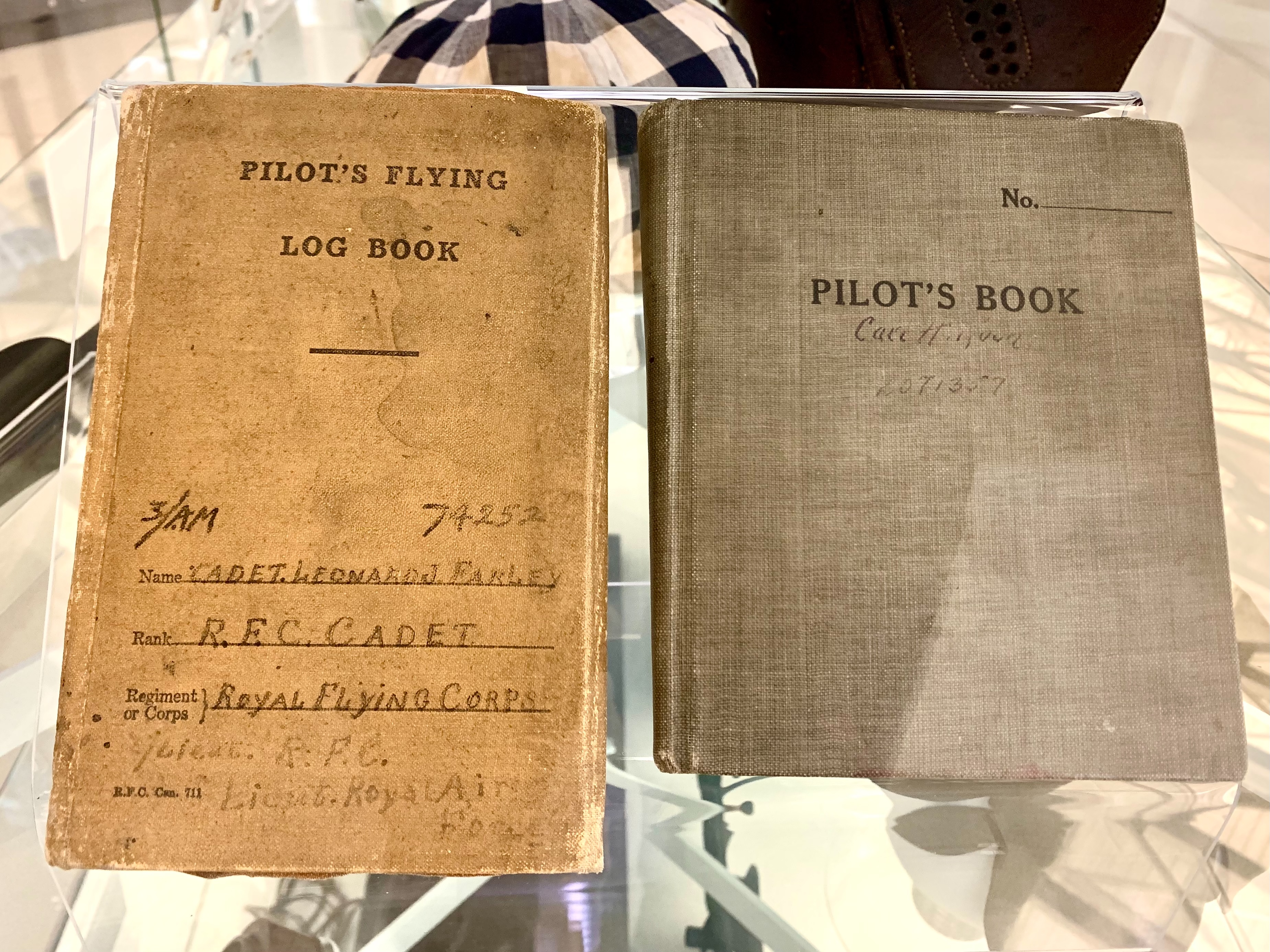
Aircraft Pilot logbook

In the United States, a pilot is required to log all flight time that is used to meet the minimum requirements for a certificate, rating, flight review, or instrument proficiency check, and for currency. This means that a pilot does not need to record every single one of his or her flights.

The Federal Aviation Administration does not require the flights logged to be logged in an official logbook or format, so long as the conditions CFR Title 14 §61.51 paragraph b are met. This requires information about the flight, such as date, total time, locations of takeoff and landing, and information regarding pilot in command, etc.

Because the FAA does not require an official logbook or official format, many formats are available to pilots. Some pilots even use digital methods, such as recording this information in a spreadsheet, or using a specially designed app.

== See also ==
- Logbook
