= Hobbs meter =

Aviation elapsed time recording device

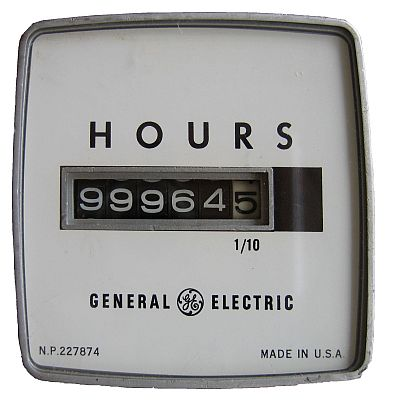
A Hobbs Meter made by General Electric about 1970

Hobbs meter is a generic trademark for devices used in aviation to measure the time that an aircraft is in use. The meters typically display hours and tenths of an hour, but there are several ways in which the meter may be activated:

1. It can measure the time that the electrical system is on. This maximizes the recorded time.
2. It can be activated by oil pressure running into a pressure switch, and therefore runs while the engine is running. Many rental aircraft use this method to remove the incentive to fly with the master electrical switch off.
3. It can be activated by another switch, either an airspeed sensing vane under a wing (as in the Cessna Caravan) or a pressure switch attached to the landing gear (as in many twin engine planes). In these cases, the meter only measures the time the aircraft is actually flying. Metrics such as Time In Service and Turbine Actual Runtime are kept to monitor overhaul cycles, and are usually used by commercial operators under Federal Aviation Regulations Parts 135, 121, or 125.
4. It can be activated when the engine alternators are online (as in the Cirrus SR series).

== History ==
The Hobbs meter is named after John Weston Hobbs (1889–1968), who in 1938 founded the company named after him in Springfield, Illinois, which manufactured the first electrically wound clocks for vehicle use. World War II created the demand for aviation hour meters which led to the development of the original Hobbs meter. The company was eventually renamed Honeywell Hobbs after being acquired by Honeywell International, who in 2009 announced plans to move manufacturing to Mexico.

In 2022, Honeywell obsoleted all of their hour meters including the Hobbs meter line.

== General aviation use ==
For general aviation, "Hobbs time" is usually recorded in the pilot's log book, and many fixed-base operators that rent airplanes charge an hourly rate based on Hobbs time. Tachometer time or "tach time" is recorded in the engine's log books and is used, for example, to determine when the oil should be changed and the time between overhauls. Tach time differs from Hobbs time in that it is linked to engine revolutions per minute (RPM). Tach time records the time at a specific RPM. It is most accurate at cruise RPM, and least accurate while taxiing or stationary with the engine running. At these times, the clock runs slower. Depending on the type of flight, tach time can be 10–20% less than Hobbs time. Many organizations, such as flying clubs, charge by tach time so as to differentiate themselves from fixed-base operators as 10–20% less time recorded makes it 10–20% cheaper to fly (if the hourly rate is the same). In the case where flying clubs use tach time, many will charge a "dry rate", requiring the renter to pay for fuel on top of the hourly tach time rate.
