= State Highway 1 (New Zealand) =

Road in New Zealand

State Highway 1

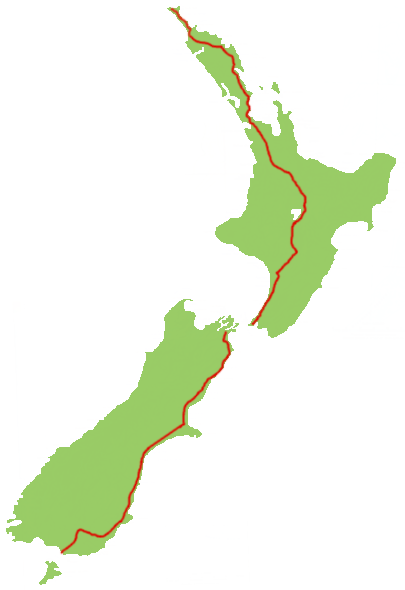

Route information
- Maintained by NZ Transport Agency Waka Kotahi
- Length: 2,033 km (1,263 mi)
- Tourist routes: Twin Coast Discovery Highway; Thermal Explorer Highway; Classic New Zealand Wine Trail; Alpine Pacific Triangle; Southern Scenic Route

North Island (SH 1N)
- Length: 1,081 km (672 mi)
- North end: Cape Reinga / Te Rerenga Wairua
- Major intersections: SH 2 south near Pōkeno; SH 5 north at Wairakei; SH 5 south (Napier-Taupō Highway) at Taupō; SH 3 north (Bridge Street) at Bulls; SH 3 south (Dundas Street) at Sanson; SH 2 north (Hutt Road) at Ngauranga Interchange
- South end: Wellington International Airport

South Island (SH 1S)
- Length: 952 km (592 mi)
- North end: Picton railway station
- Major intersections: SH 6 south (Nelson Street) at Blenheim; SH 7 (Waipara Flat Road) at Waipara; SH 8 south (Racecourse Road) at Washdyke; SH 8 north (Manuka Gorge Highway) at Clarksville; SH 6 north (Dee Street) at Invercargill
- South end: Bluff (Stirling Point)

Location
- Country: New Zealand
- Primary destinations: Whangārei; North Shore; Auckland; Manukau; Hamilton; Taupō; Porirua; Wellington; Picton; Blenheim; Christchurch; Ashburton; Timaru; Oamaru; Dunedin; Gore; Invercargill

Highway system
- New Zealand state highways; Motorways and expressways; List
← SH 99	→ SH 2

State Highway 1 (SH 1) is the longest and most significant road in the New Zealand road network, running the length of both main islands. It appears on road maps as SH 1 and on road signs as a white number 1 on a red shield, but it has the official designations SH 1N in the North Island and SH 1S in the South Island.

SH 1 is 2,006 kilometres (1,246 mi) long, 1,074 km (667 mi) in the North Island and 932 km (579 mi) in the South Island. Since 2010 new roads have reduced the length from 2,033 km (1,263 mi). For the majority of its length it is a two-lane single carriageway, with at-grade intersections and property accesses, in both rural and urban areas. These sections have some passing lanes. Around 315 km (196 mi) of SH 1 is of motorway or expressway standard as of August 2022: 281 km (175 mi) in the North Island and 34 km (21 mi) in the South Island.

== Route ==
=== North Island (SH 1N) ===
SH 1 starts at Cape Reinga, at the northwestern tip of the Aupōuri Peninsula, and since April 2010 has been sealed (mainly with either chipseal or asphalt) for its entire length. From Waitiki Landing south of Cape Reinga, SH 1 travels down the central-eastern side of the peninsula to Kaitaia, New Zealand's northernmost town, then travels through the Mangamuka Gorge before turning south-east across the Northland Peninsula on to Kawakawa in the Bay of Islands where the roadway is shared by the Bay of Islands Vintage Railway track, and then south to the city of Whangārei, the largest urban area in Northland.

SH 1 then skirts the south-western Whangārei Harbour, nearing the coast briefly at Ruakākā, before proceeding down to wind through the Brynderwyn Hills before approaching the upper reaches of the Kaipara Harbour. The highway crosses into the Auckland Region, passing through Wellsford.

Just north of Warkworth, SH 1 becomes the northernmost section of the Auckland Northern Motorway. This section was opened in 2023 and extends 18.5 km (11.5 mi) to the Johnstones Hill Tunnels, just south of Puhoi. At this point the motorway becomes the Northern Gateway Toll Road, a 7.5 km (4.7 mi) section of automated toll road passing the Hibiscus Coast suburbs of Orewa and Silverdale. From Silverdale, the motorway becomes toll-free, crossing farmland to Albany and continuing past suburbs on the North Shore of Auckland. The road crosses over the Waitematā Harbour on the Auckland Harbour Bridge into Auckland's city centre and the Central Motorway Junction. At this junction, SH 1 becomes the Auckland Southern Motorway, and proceeds in a south-easterly direction across the Auckland isthmus, through Manukau and Papakura to the top of the Bombay Hills, just short of the Auckland/Waikato boundary.

At Bombay, SH 1 becomes the Waikato Expressway, a four-lane dual-carriageway expressway. The expressway takes the highway down the Bombay Hills to Mercer, where SH 1 meets the Waikato River, which it broadly follows for the next 220 km (140 mi). The Waikato Expressway bypasses Hamilton city centre to the east, then bypasses Cambridge to the north before reverting to a single carriageway east of the town. The highway continues eastward to the town of Tīrau, where it turns south to pass through Putāruru and Tokoroa and the surrounding exotic pine plantation forest area.

At Wairakei, SH 1 takes an eastern route to bypass Taupō and meet the Lake Taupō shoreline south of the town near the airport. SH 1 follows the eastern shore of the lake for 50 km (31 mi) to Tūrangi, at the southern end of the lake. Via SH32/41 the distance is about 6 km (3.7 mi) shorter than this section of SH1.

Turning southwards again, SH 1 leaves Tūrangi and ascends onto the North Island Volcanic Plateau, passing through the fringes of the Tongariro National Park and into the Rangipo Desert, passing the volcanoes of Ruapehu, Ngauruhoe and Tongariro. The road between Rangipo (10 km (6.2 mi) south of Tūrangi) and Waiouru is commonly known as the Desert Road. SH 1 enters the Manawatū-Whanganui Region, and descends through an army training area to the end of the Desert Road at Waiouru.

From Waiouru, the highway follows tributaries of the Rangitikei River through Taihape to meet the main river at Utiku. It then follows the western bank of the Rangitikei through Ohingaiti and Hunterville to Bulls. At Bulls, SH 1 turns southeast to cross the river, turning southwest again 5 km (3.1 mi) down the road at Sanson. SH 1 crosses the Manawatū Plains, passing the city of Palmerston North about 20 km (12 mi) west of it. It passes through Foxton, before reaching the end of the plain at Levin.

From Levin, SH 1 follows the narrowing western coastal plain southwards. The highway crosses into the Wellington Region 15 km (9 mi) south of Levin, and just north of Ōtaki widens into the Kāpiti Expressway, a fully grade-separated four-lane dual carriageway. This expressway bypasses the Kāpiti conurbation of Waikanae, Paraparaumu and Raumati, before reaching the end of the coastal plain at Mackays Crossing. It then becomes the Transmission Gully Motorway and steeply ascends through mountainous terrain to the Wainui Saddle, before descending through its namesake to Pāuatahanui and bypassing Porirua to the east before reaching the northern suburbs of Wellington, New Zealand's capital city.

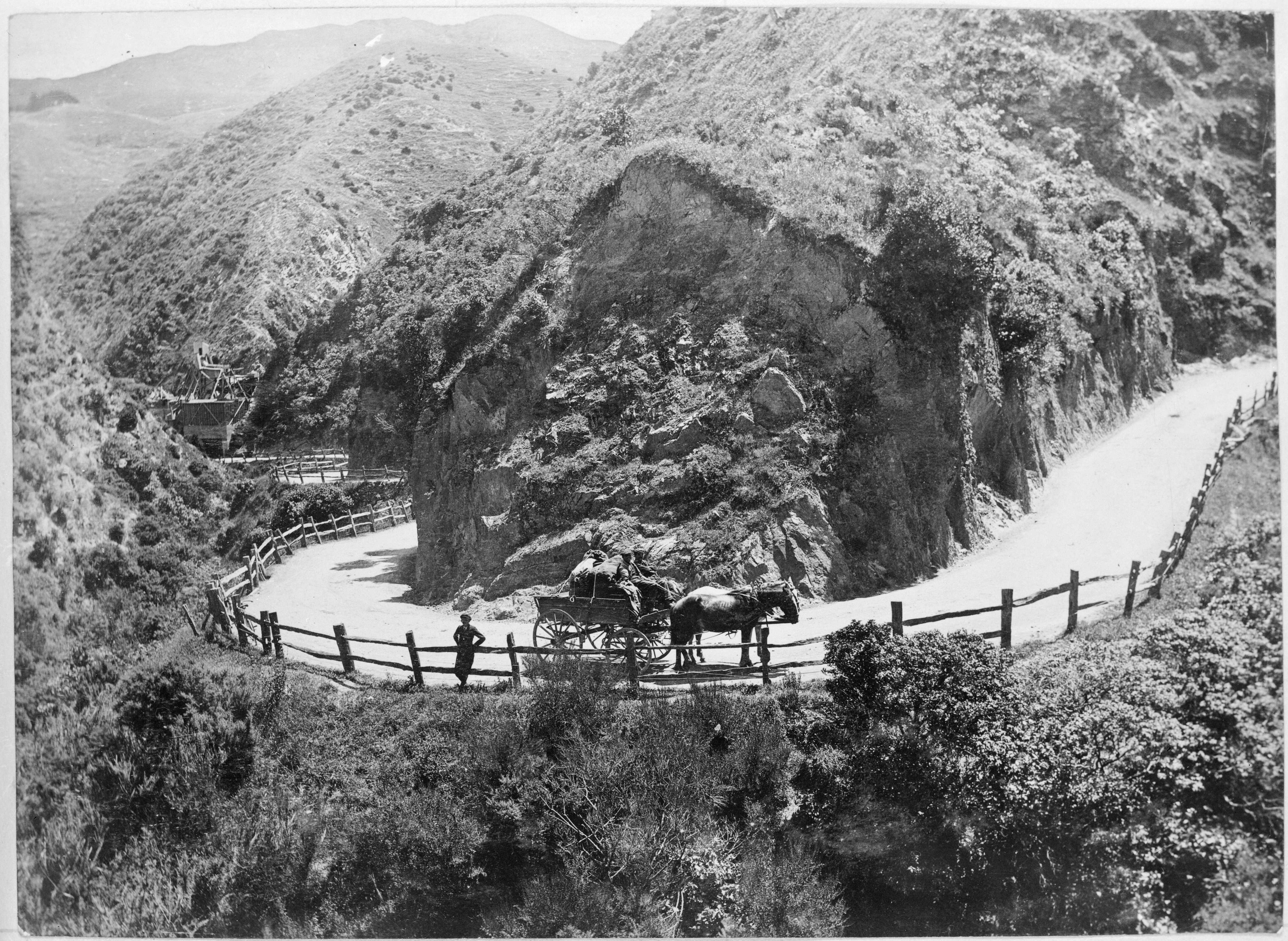
SH1 Ngauranga Gorge, 1912

Immediately after entering the city of Wellington in the suburb of Linden, the Transmission Gully Motorway ends, and SH 1 merges on to the Johnsonville-Porirua Motorway. The motorway gradually ascends through Tawa before reaching Johnsonville. Here, the motorway ends, and SH 1 as a six-lane arterial road steeply descends through the Ngauranga Gorge to the Ngauranga Interchange, on the shore of Wellington Harbour.

At Ngauranga, SH 1 becomes the Wellington Urban Motorway, skirting the shore of the harbour then passing the city centre to the west. The motorway ends at Te Aro, where a one-way system takes traffic to the Basin Reserve. Northbound traffic uses the Wellington Inner City Bypass (opened 2007), while southbound traffic uses Vivian Street. From the Basin Reserve, SH 1 travels through the Mount Victoria Tunnel to Wellington's eastern suburbs and Wellington International Airport. SH 1 ends at a roundabout at the entrance to the airport.

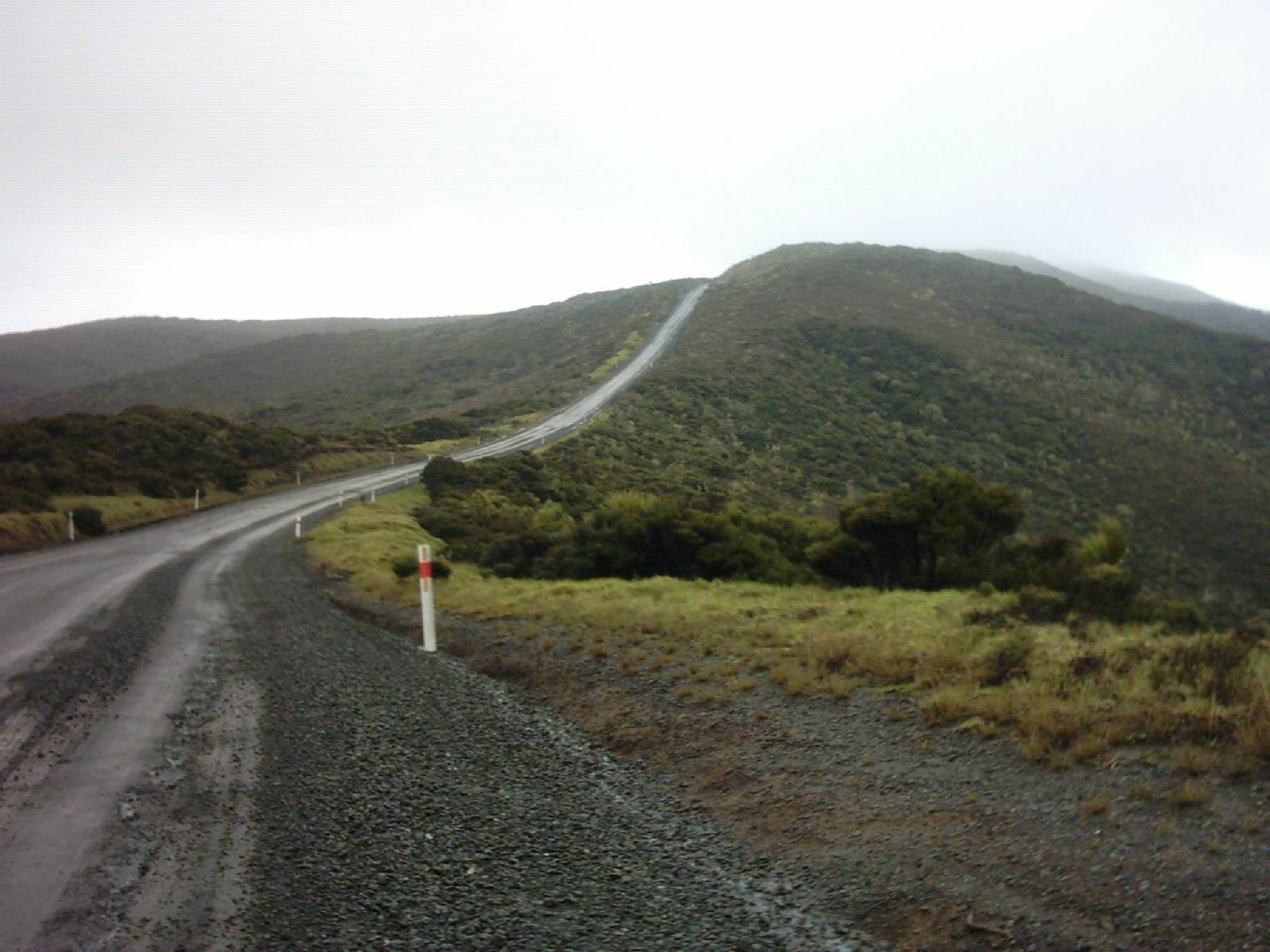
SH 1 near Cape Reinga. Sealing of this section was completed in April 2010.

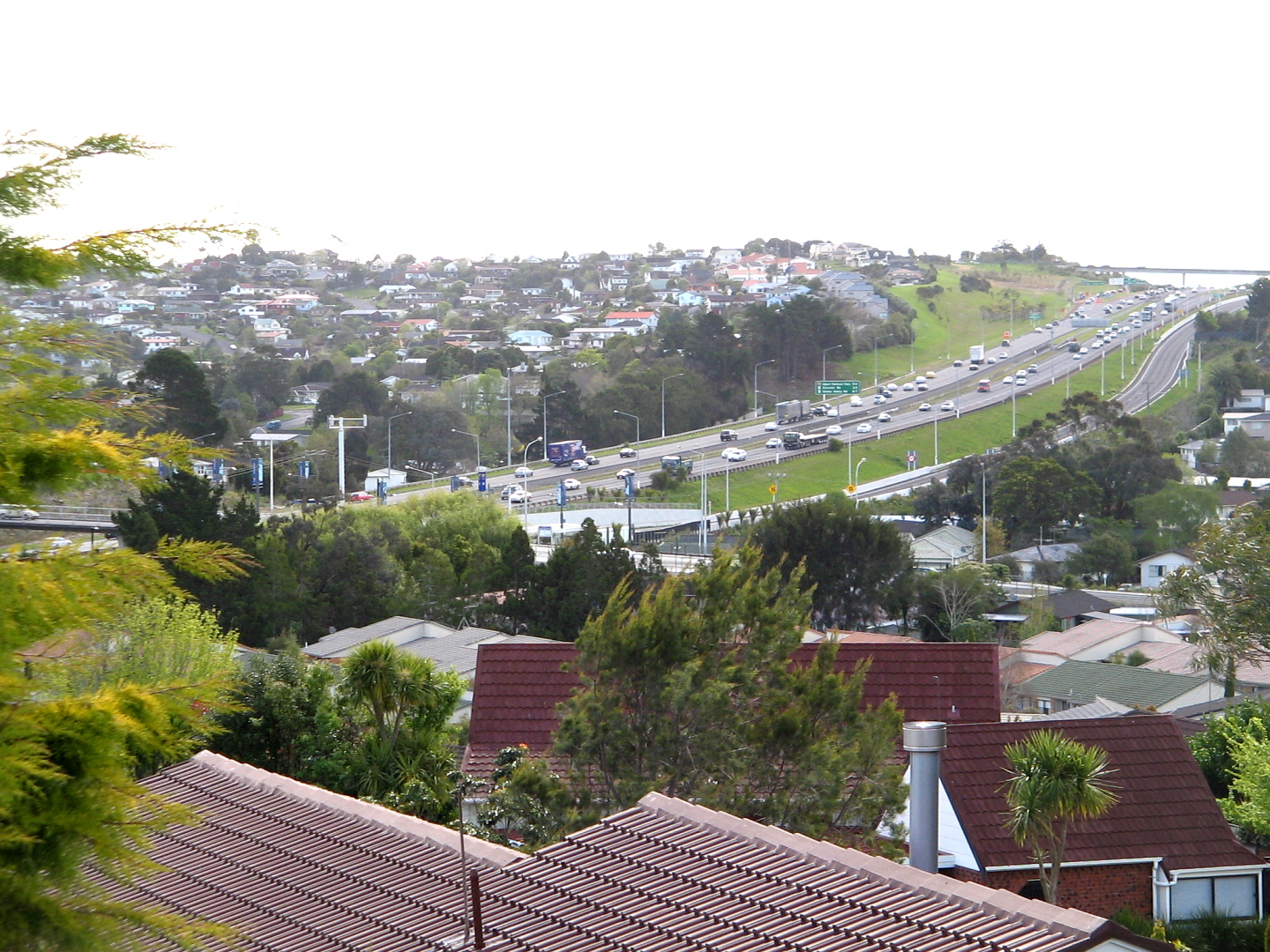
SH 1 as the Auckland Northern Motorway, looking north from Forrest Hill, North Shore

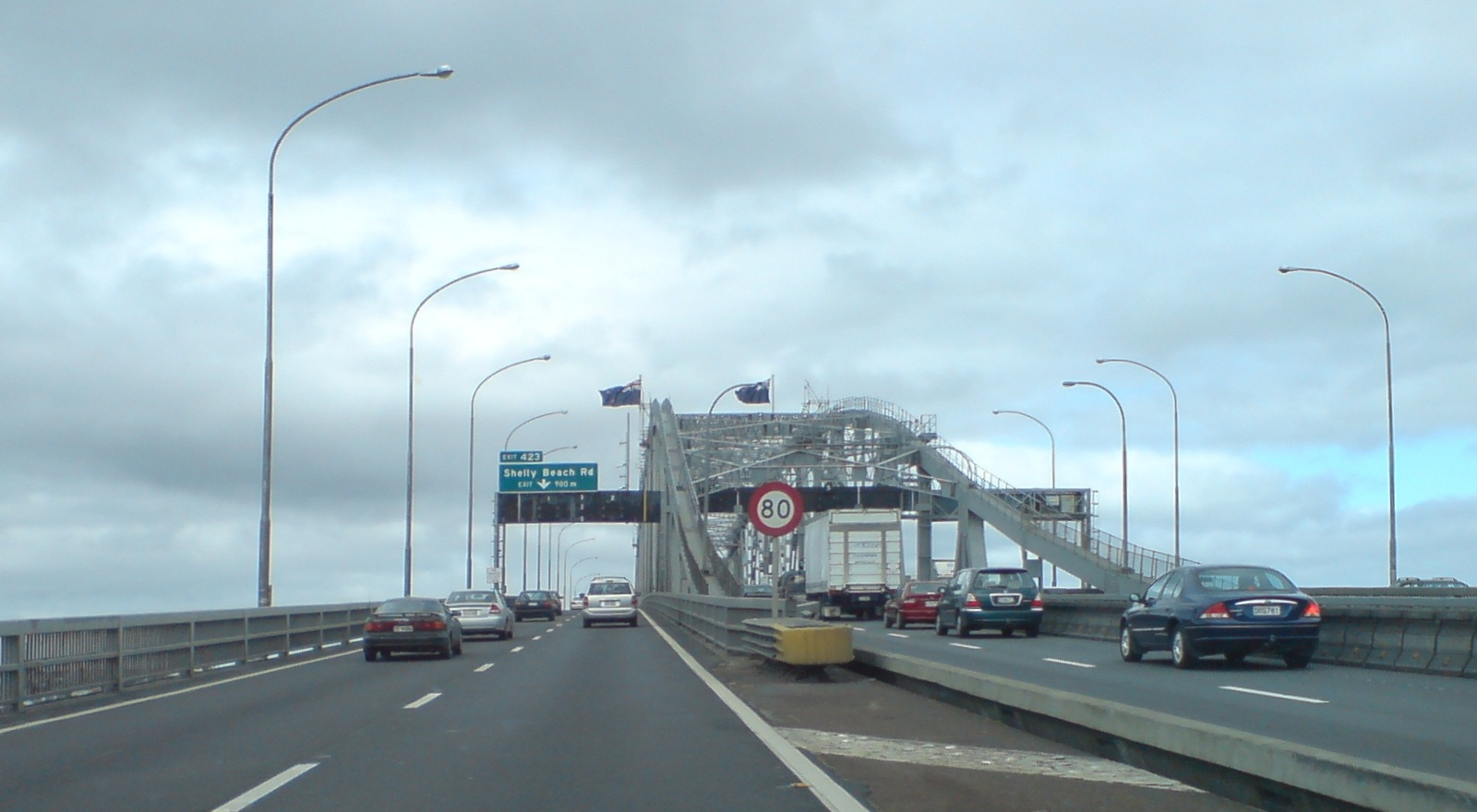
SH 1 crossing the Auckland Harbour Bridge

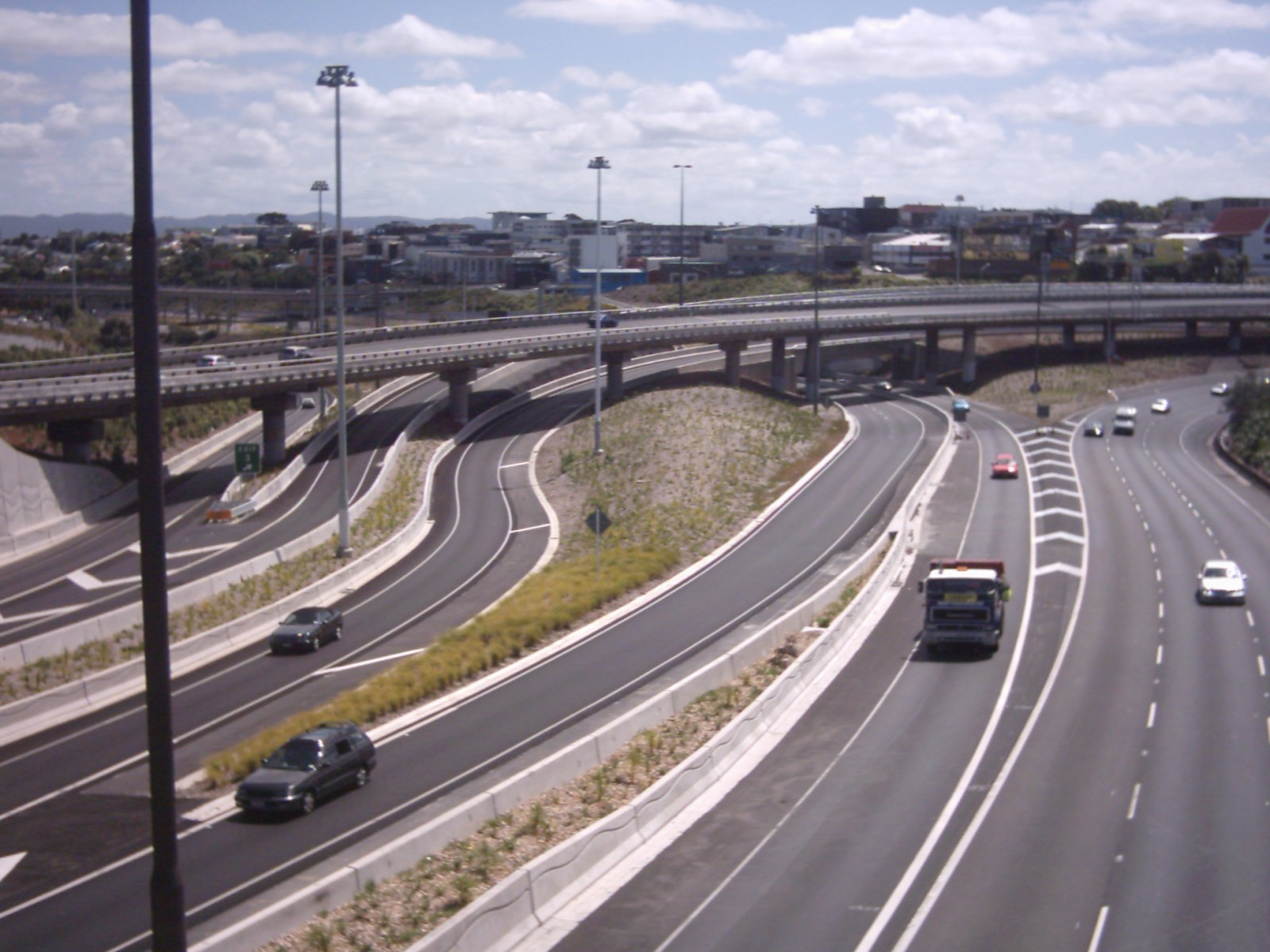
SH 1 through the Central Motorway Junction ("Spaghetti Junction")

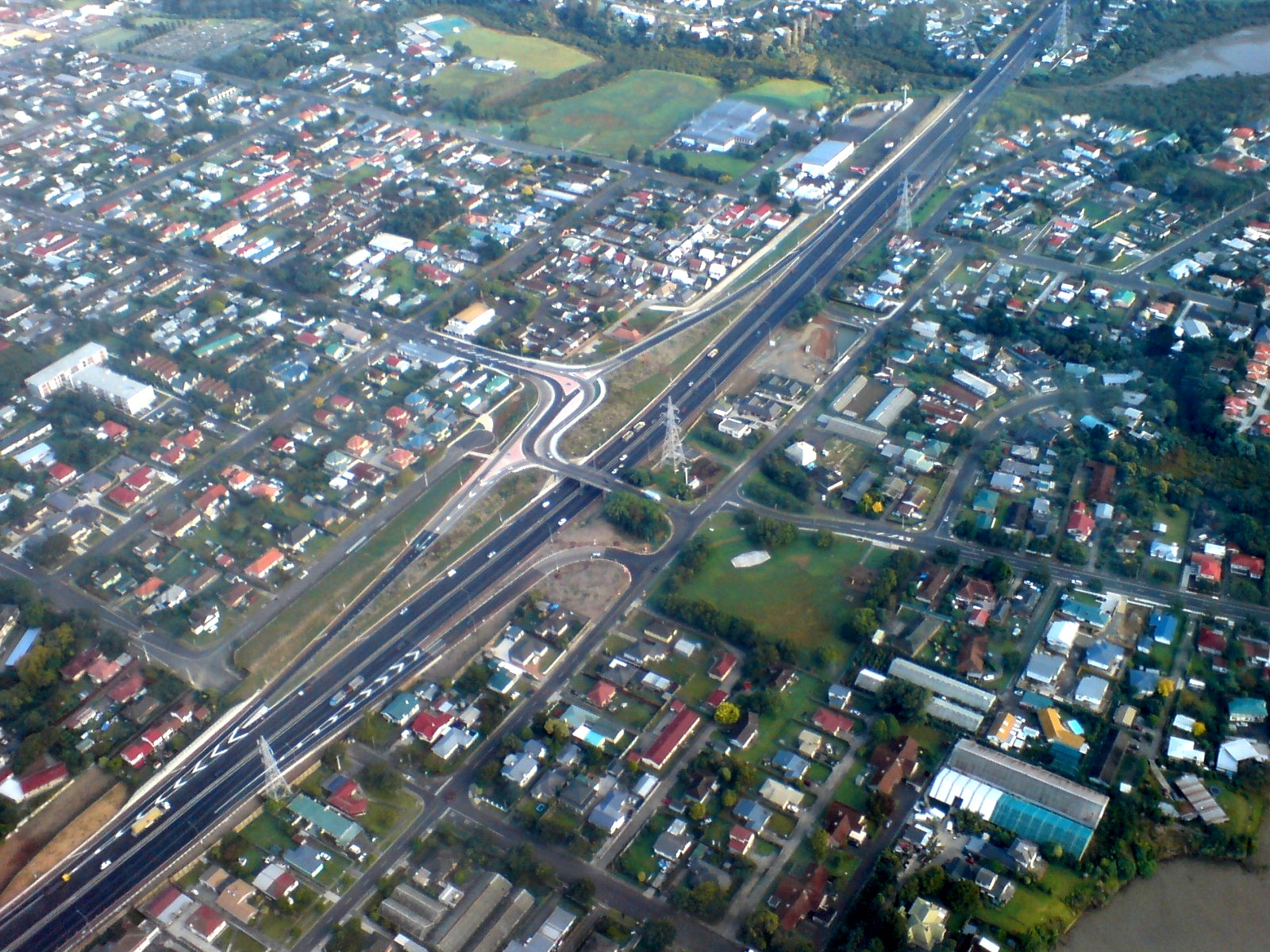
SH 1, as the Southern Motorway, in Ōtāhuhu, Auckland

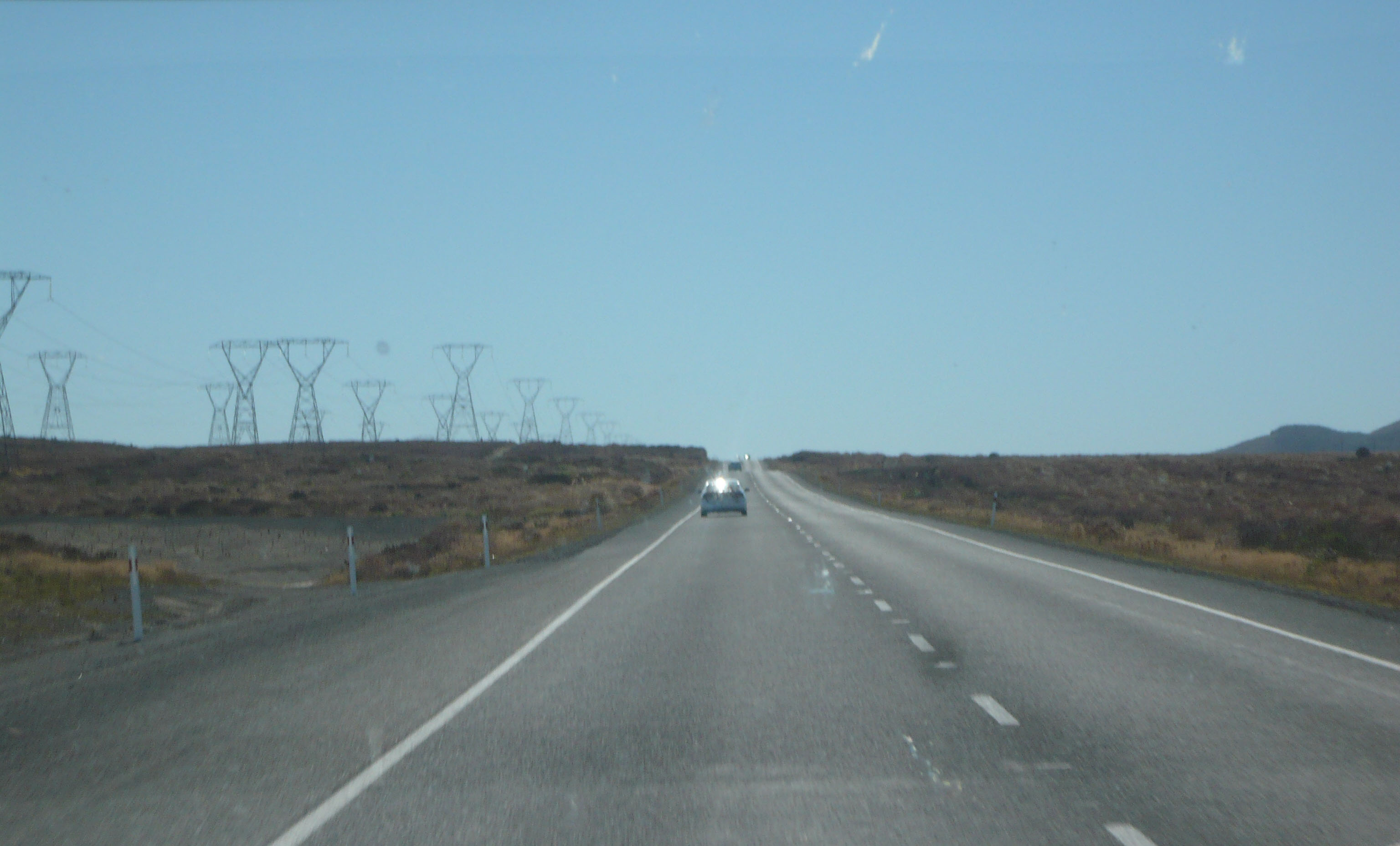
Travelling north on SH 1 through the Rangipo Desert. This section is known as the Desert Road, and is frequently closed by snow in winter.

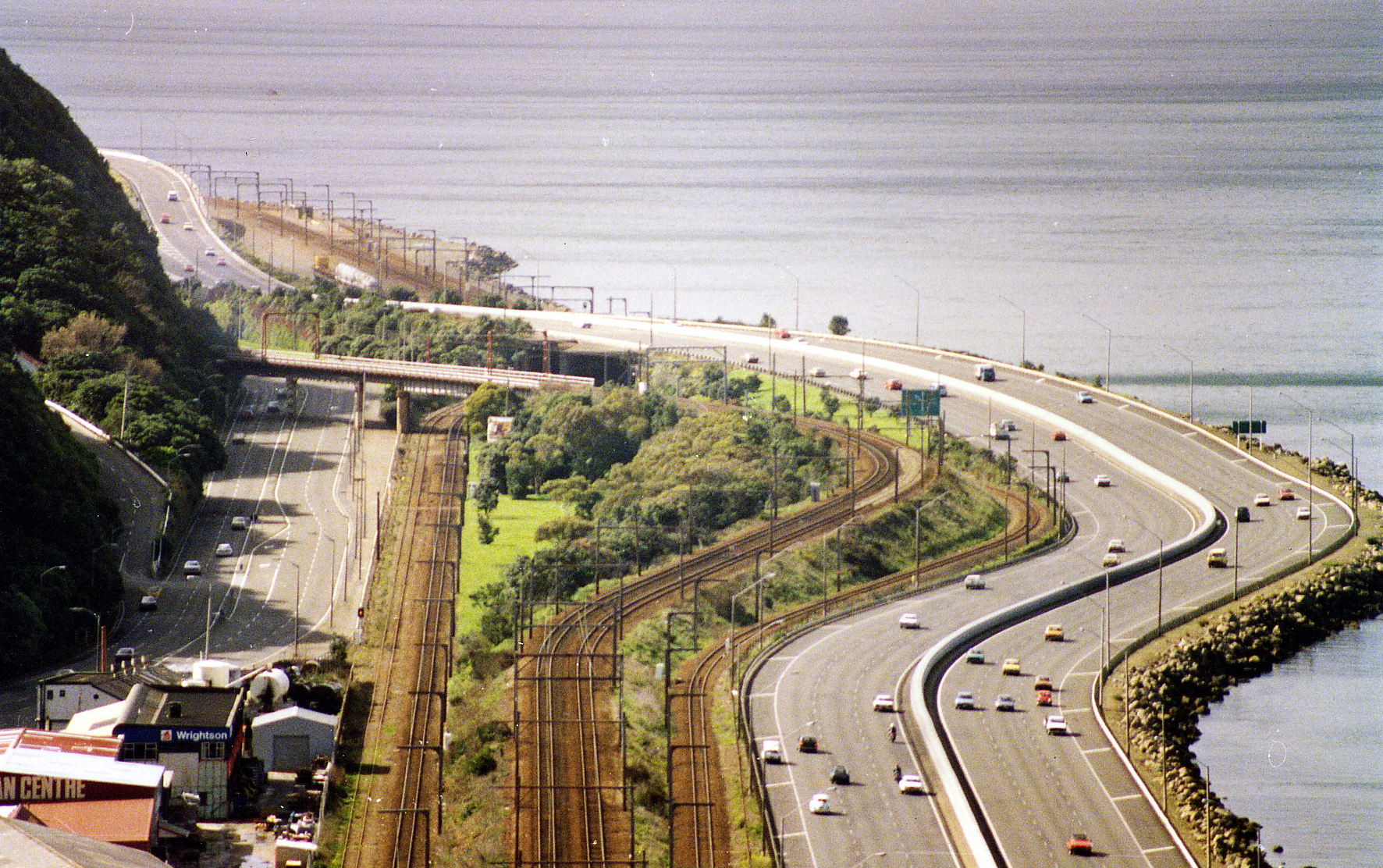
SH 1 as the Wellington Urban Motorway, running beside Wellington Harbour

=== South Island (SH 1S) ===
The South Island section of SH 1 starts in Picton, adjacent to the railway station. Leaving Picton, SH 1 rises steeply to cross the Elevation saddle into the valley of the Tuamarina River. It descends alongside this river and across the Wairau Plain before reaching Blenheim. SH 1 passes through Weld Pass and Dashwood Pass to enter the Awatere Valley, then continues southward before passing Lake Grassmere. From the small town of Ward the highway heads to the coast and follows it to Kaikōura. After passing Kaikōura, it veers inland, twisting through the Hundalee Ranges before emerging at the northern end of the Canterbury Plains.

The section of highway between the Clarence River and Hapuku Rivers north of Kaikōura was closed from 14 November 2016 to 15 December 2017, due to damage from the 2016 Kaikōura earthquake.

SH 1 passes through Amberley and Woodend before becoming the Christchurch Northern Motorway and bypassing Kaiapoi to the west. At The Groynes west of Belfast, the motorway narrows to a four-lane divided arterial. SH 1 continues around the north-western urban fringe of Christchurch, passing just east of Christchurch International Airport. At Hornby, the highway turns south-west, narrows to a two-lane undivided road and passes through Templeton. It then merges onto the Christchurch Southern Motorway where the highway becomes expressway standard until it approaches Rolleston.

South of Rolleston, SH 1 becomes virtually straight as it crosses the wide fan of the Canterbury plains, crossing the country's longest road bridge at Rakaia before reaching Ashburton, and then veering back towards the coast, which it reaches at Timaru. Between Ashburton and Timaru it crosses Rangitata Island in the Rangitata River.

South of Timaru, the road again passes through gentle hill country, staying close to the coast but largely out of sight of it. The road veers inland briefly, bypassing Waimate as it reaches the plains around the mouth of the Waitaki River, which it crosses to enter Otago. It passes through Oamaru, from where it turns inland briefly, crossing undulating hill country before again reaching the coast at Moeraki. From here the road again hugs the coast along Katiki Beach, remaining closer to the ocean than at any point since Kaikōura. The highway turns inland at Shag Point, passing through Palmerston and Waikouaiti.

South of Waikouaiti the road again becomes steep, rising sharply over the Kilmog hill before dropping down to the coast at Blueskin Bay, then rising again via Dunedin-Waitati Highway (a two- to four-lane carriageway which used to be designated a motorway) to the northern outskirts of Dunedin. From here it descends a steep, twisting stretch of Pine Hill Road through Pine Hill, before passing the University of Otago and heading through the city centre. For much of its route through Central Dunedin the highway is split into two separate northbound and southbound roads, part of the city's one-way street system. These roads traverse the central city 2–3 blocks southeast of the heart of the CBD. At the southern end of central Dunedin, the highway becomes the Caversham By-pass, which rises along the Caversham Valley before again becoming a motorway at the saddle of Lookout Point.

The four-lane motorway (Dunedin Southern Motorway) runs through Dunedin's southern suburbs until the interchange with SH 87 at Mosgiel. SH 1 then heads southwest across the Taieri Plains. The area between the Taieri and Waipori Rivers is flood-prone, and the highway crosses this on a major embankment known colloquially as the flood-free highway. SH 1 continues through gentle hill country and along the shore of Lake Waihola, then crosses the Tokomairiro Plains into Milton. South of Milton is a major junction with SH 8 at Clarksville Junction. SH 1 continues to cross rolling hill country to reach Balclutha.

From Balclutha, the highway turns west, veering briefly north as it heads inland to avoid the rough hills of The Catlins. It passes through the small town of Clinton before reaching the major provincial town of Gore. Because of the names of these two towns, this stretch of the highway was christened "The Presidential Highway" during the time of the Clinton-Gore administration in the United States. At Gore, the highway crosses the Mataura River; from here the road again turns south to roughly follow the river. The highway passes through Mataura before turning west at Edendale. Many travellers choose to turn onto SH 93 at Clinton, as this route shortens the journey between Clinton and Mataura by about 10 km (6.2 mi) and bypasses Gore. Over its last stretch the road veers southwest before reaching the city of Invercargill. In central Invercargill it meets the southern end of SH 6 and turns due south, skirting the estuary of the New River and Bluff Harbour. It passes through the small town of Bluff before reaching its terminus at Stirling Point, a kilometre south of Bluff. A commemorative signpost at Stirling Point indicates distances to major world centres and to the start of the highway at Picton.

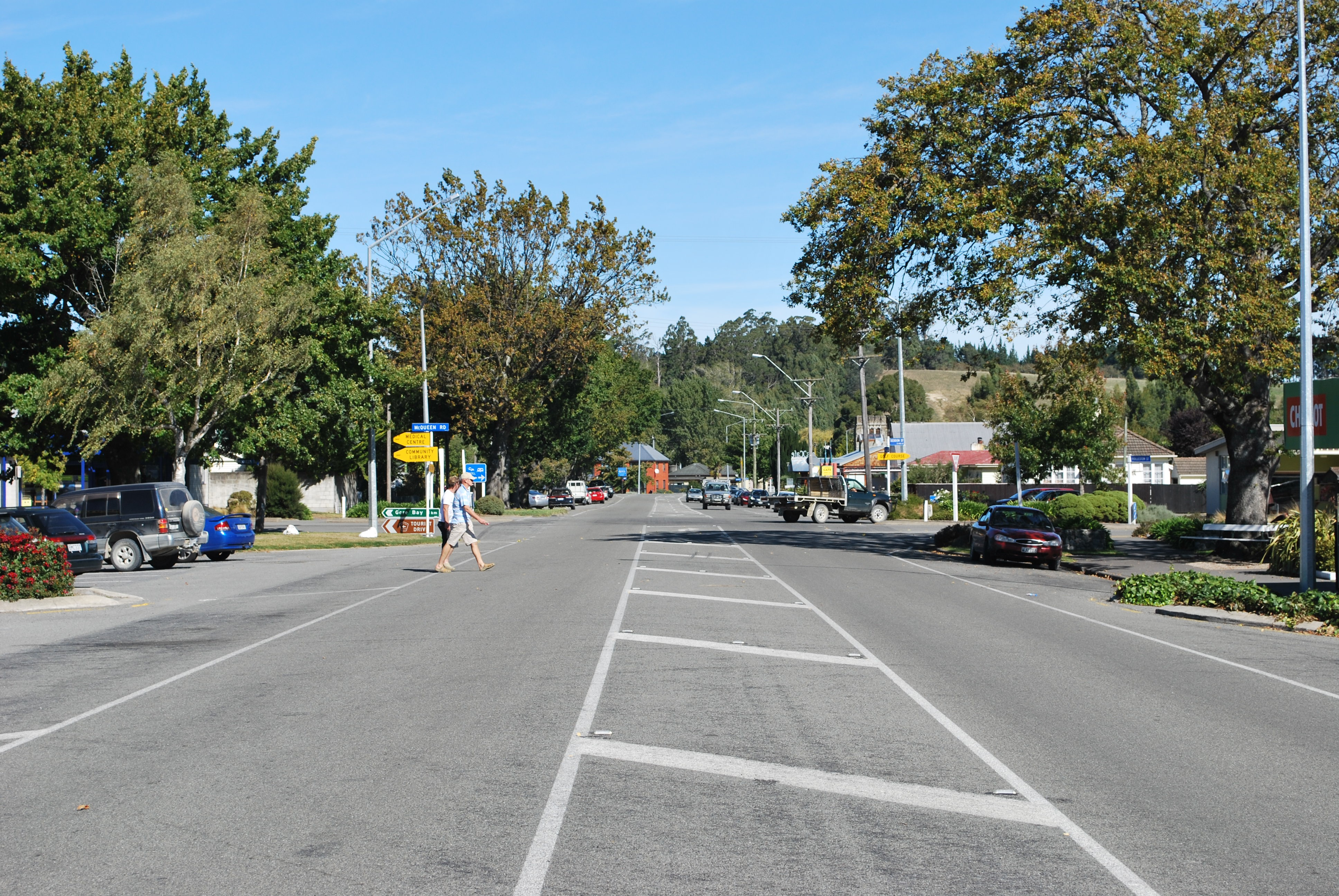
SH 1 passing through the North Canterbury town of Cheviot

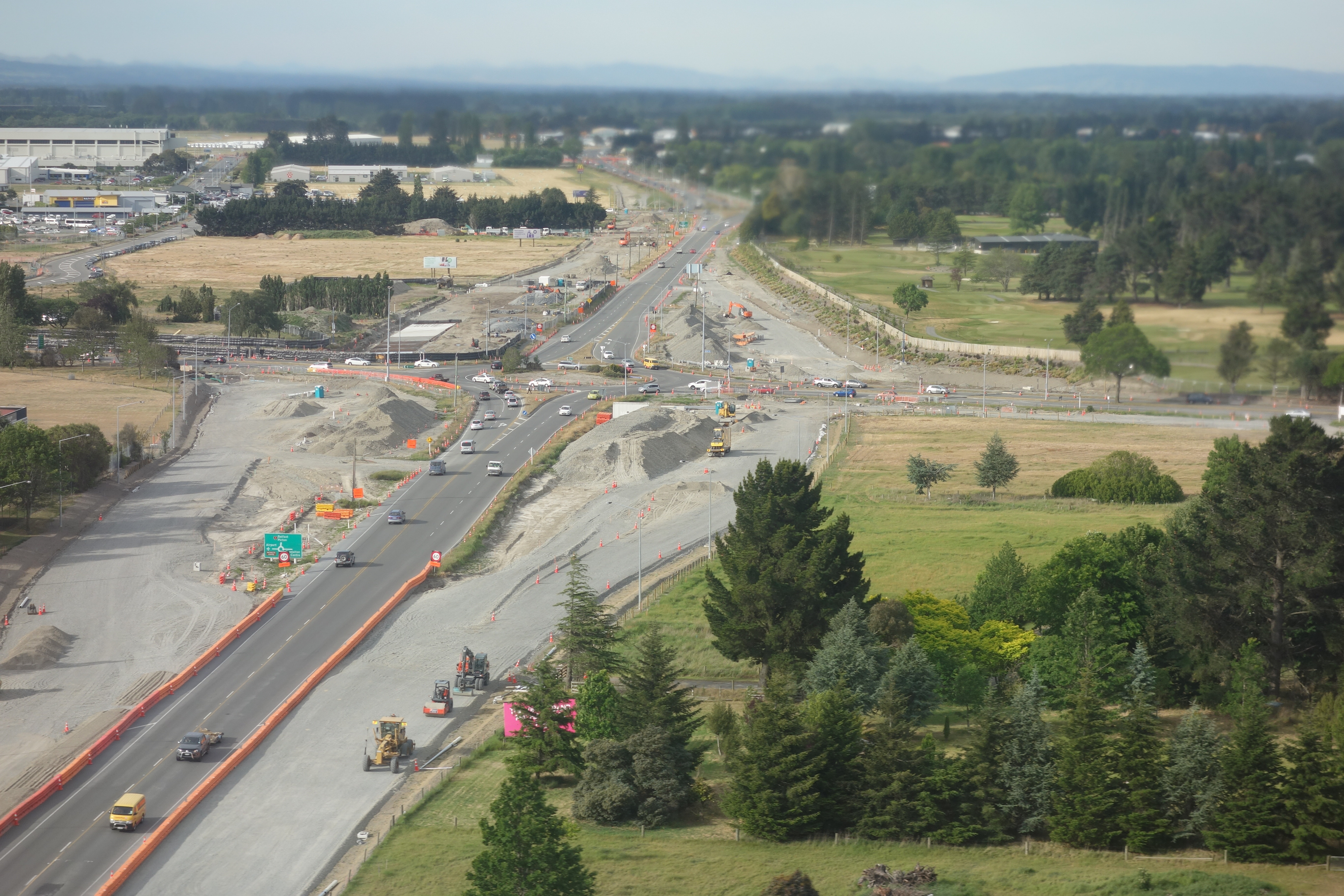
Upgrading of SH1 to four lanes in Harewood, Christchurch and grade-separating at Memorial Avenue is under construction

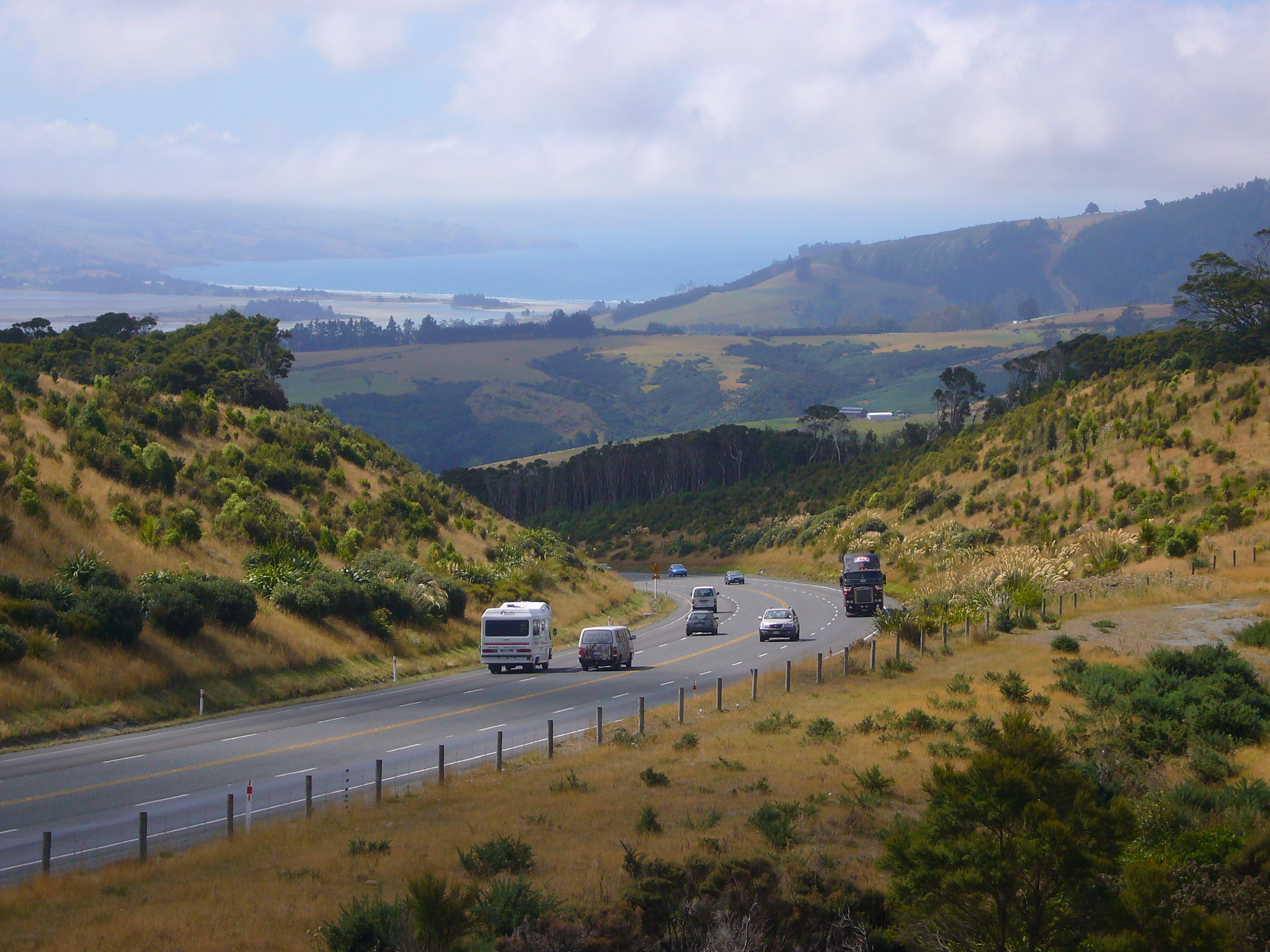
Dunedin-Waitati Hwy looking north from near the Pigeon Flat Overbridge. Blueskin Bay is visible in the background.

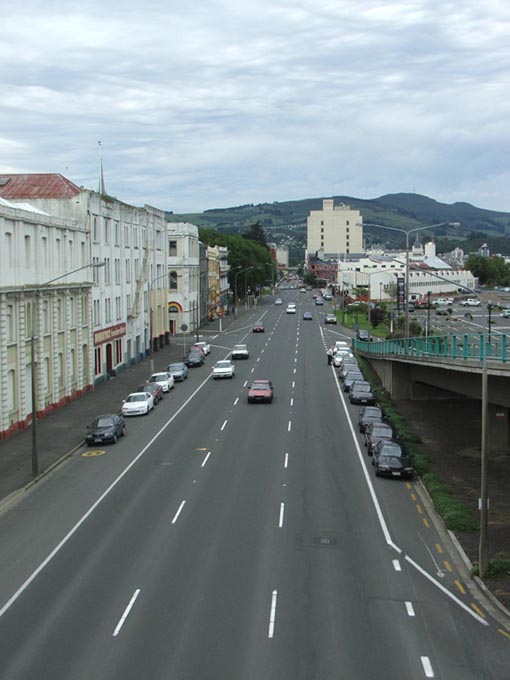
In Dunedin, the highway forms a pair of multi-lane one-way streets. Cumberland Street, 1 km (0.62 mi) south of the city centre.

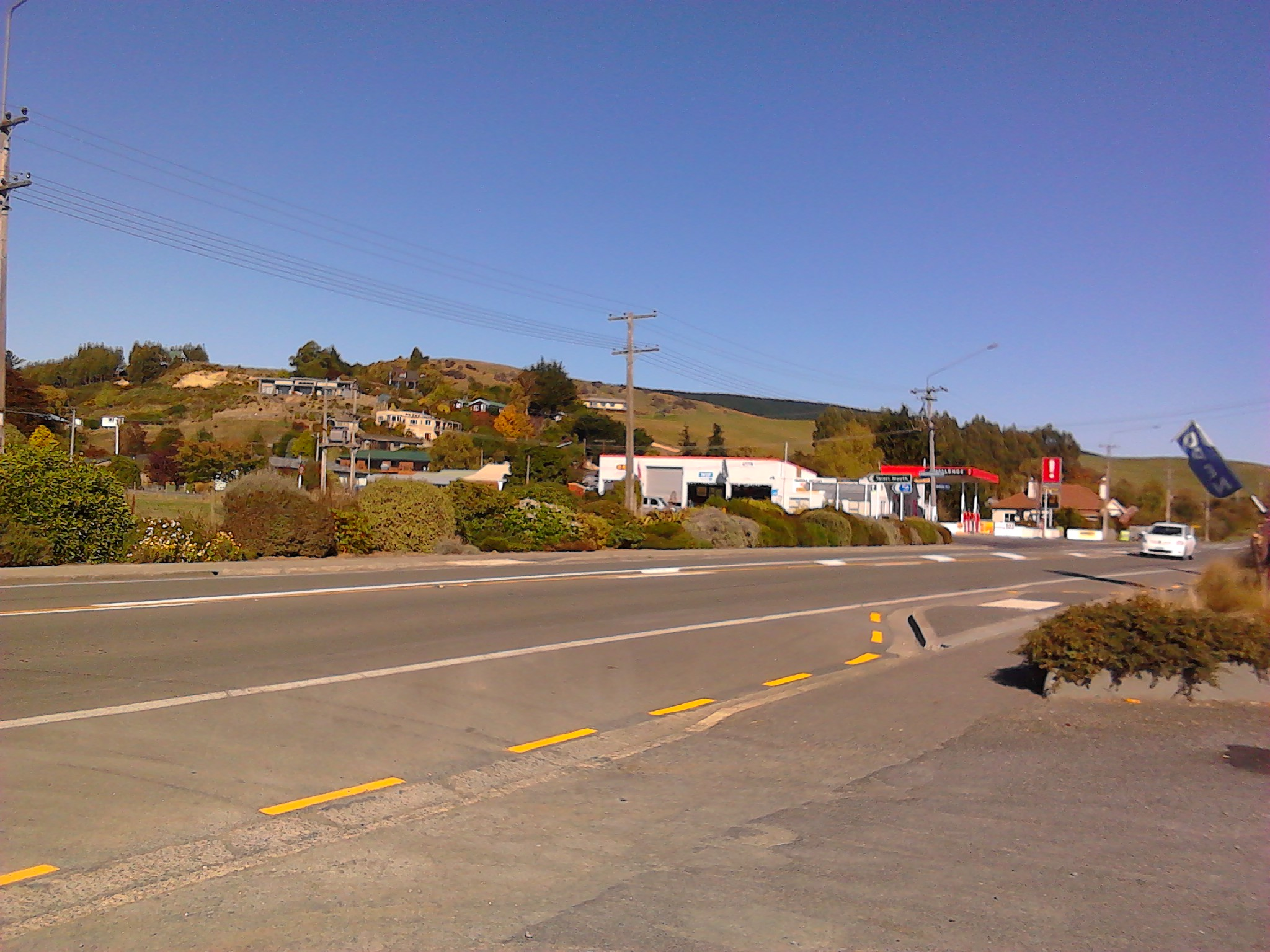
SH 1 in the Otago town of Waihola

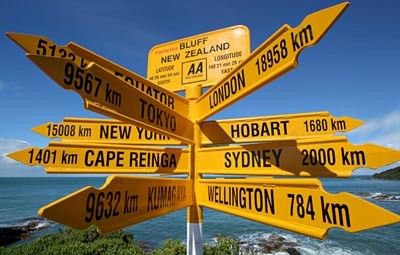
Signpost at Stirling Point, Bluff

=== Spur sections ===
State Highway 1B
- Location: SH 1 at Taupiri – SH 1 at Cambridge
- Length: 41.9 km (26.0 mi)

State Highway 1C
- Location: SH 1 at Horsham Downs – SH 1 at Tamahere
- Length: 24 km (15 mi)

SH 1 has two spurs, both in the vicinity of Hamilton:

- SH 1B runs from SH 1N at Taupiri to SH 1N at Cambridge, and provides an eastern bypass of Hamilton. Gazetted in 1999, the 42 km (26 mi) highway utilises many roads which were previously under the administration of the Waikato District Council. Part of the highway also shares a concurrency with SH 26. Recent progress of construction of the Waikato Expressway at Ngāruawāhia and Cambridge have also resulted in the curtailment of SH 1B at both the northern and southern termini. SH 1B is to be handed back to the Waikato District Council after the completion of the Hamilton section of the Waikato Expressway in 2022. Because it was not intended to be a permanent state highway, there are intersections where the state highway gives priority to local roads in several places.
- SH 1C runs from SH 1N at Horsham Downs to SH 1N at Tamahere. This was the former route of SH 1 through Hamilton, prior to the opening of the Hamilton section of the Waikato Expressway in July 2022. This route is 24 km (15 mi).

== Road conditions ==
SH 1 has varied road conditions. For most of its length it is a two-lane single carriageway road with at-grade intersections and access, sealed with chipseal in rural areas or asphalt in urban and high-traffic areas. The highway has frequent passing lanes on these sections, to allow traffic to pass other vehicles safely. Parts of the road are steep by international standards. Most steep sections having a combination of passing lanes (uphill), and crawler lanes or stopping bays (downhill) to allow heavy and slow vehicles to pull out of the way to let other vehicles pass.

NZ Transport Agency Waka Kotahi classifies the most part of State Highway 1 as a national strategic road. The exceptions are between Kawakawa and Whangārei and south of Mosgiel, where the SH 1 is classified as a regional strategic road, and north of Kawakawa where SH 1 is classified as a primary collector road. The sections between Wellsford and Wairakei, between Ōhau and Wellington Airport, and between Woodend and Rolleston are classified as high volume roads. The section from the Central Motorway Junction and the Newmarket Viaduct, 3 km (1.9 mi) to the south, is the country's busiest section of road, with more than 200,000 vehicle movements a day between Khyber Pass Road and Gillies Ave.

NZTA announced in September 2010 that it was replacing the last three fords on SH 1S. The shingle fan fords are near Kaikōura, and while generally being dry, on about 28 days a year state highway traffic used to detour around them due to high water levels on old single-lane bridges, leading to delays on a major freight route. With the detour bridges reaching the end of their lifespan, NZTA replaced the fords with culverts.

== Route changes ==
=== Motorway and expressway upgrades ===
Construction of motorways and expressways has diverted the route of State Highway 1 in many places.

The opening of the Auckland Harbour Bridge and the Auckland Northern Motorway between Northcote Road and Fanshawe Street in May 1959 saw State Highway 1 diverted from its former route around the Waitematā Harbour. Northern extensions of the motorway in 1969 (to Tristram Avenue), 1979 (to Sunset Road) and 1984 (to Dairy Flat Highway via Greville Road) diverted State Highway 1 off Wairau Road and Albany Highway. A motorway extension from Greville Road to Silverdale in 1999 bypassed Dairy Flat Highway, which was re-designated State Highway 17. In 2009, the Northern Motorway was extended to Puhoi, bypassing Hibiscus Coast Highway through Orewa which was re-designated part of SH 17. However, SH 17 was short lived, being revoked in September 2012 and reverting to a local arterial road. Ara Tuhono, the Puhoi to Warkworth motorway, was opened in June 2023.

The Auckland Southern Motorway was built between 1953 and 1978, bypassing the former route via Great South Road. The construction of the Central Motorway Junction between 1973 and 1978 connected the Northern and Southern Motorways, taking State Highway 1 off inner Auckland streets.

The Waikato Expressway north of Te Kauwhata has largely been built on the existing line of SH 1N, although at Pōkeno the highway was diverted to bypass the town to the east. South of Te Kauwhata, most of the expressway has been built on a new line bypassing the towns of Ohinewai, Ngāruawāhia, Te Rapa and Cambridge, as well as the city of Hamilton. Most old sections of SH 1N reverted to local arterial roads, while the former section through Hamilton became the SH 1C spur.

Construction of the Peka Peka to Ōtaki extension to the Kāpiti Expressway began in mid 2017 and opened to traffic in December 2022. The project added 13 kilometres (8 mi) of expressway to the northern end of the Kāpiti Expressway at Peka Peka, to terminate north of Ōtaki at Taylors Road.

The controversial Transmission Gully Motorway began construction in 2014, and was officially opened on 30 March 2022. It provides a new alignment for State Highway 1 between Mackays Crossing and Linden, diverting the route from the Centennial Highway between Paekākāriki and Pukerua Bay, as well as providing an eastern bypass of Porirua. The previous route of State Highway 1 was renumbered to State Highway 59 on 7 December 2021, which created a temporary 26.2 kilometres (16.3 mi) gap in the SH 1 designation until the new motorway opened.

The Johnsonville-Porirua Motorway was constructed in the 1940s and 1950s to replace the Old Porirua Road. The first section of motorway between Johnsonville and Takapu Road opened on 23 December 1950, and is New Zealand's oldest motorway.

The Wellington Urban Motorway was constructed between 1969 and 1978, but was originally part of State Highway 2 as it could only be accessed from the Hutt Valley. The construction of the Ngauranga Interchange flyovers in 1984 allowed SH 1 to be diverted onto the motorway, bypassing central Wellington streets.

The Christchurch Northern Motorway opened in October 1967 between Tram Road and Belfast, providing a second road crossing of the Waimakariri River. The motorway was extended northward to Pineacres in December 1970, bypassing Kaiapoi. The Western Belfast Bypass spur opened on 31 October 2017, extending the motorway southwest to The Groynes, allowing SH 1 traffic to bypass Belfast.

The extension of the Dunedin Southern Motorway has also seen changes in the highway, notably to bypass the suburbs of Fairfield and Sunnyvale.

=== Realignments ===
In Hamilton, SH 1N originally ran through the city centre via Te Rapa Road, Ulster Street (first agreed as an alternative to the northern end of Victoria St in 1930), Victoria Street, Bridge Street and Cobham Drive; this original route later became Hamilton Urban Route 4. In 1992, SH 1N was diverted to run through Frankton via Avalon Drive, Greenwood Street, Kahikatea Drive and Normandy Avenue. The Frankton route then became the SH 1C spur in July 2022, with SH 1N being diverted to the newly opened Hamilton section of the Waikato Expressway.

In Christchurch, SH 1S originally ran via the city centre rather than around the outskirts via Harewood. The original route was via Main North Road, Cranford Street, Sherborne Street, Bealey Avenue, Madras and Gasson Streets (north)/Barbadoes Street and Waltham Road (south), Brougham Street, the Christchurch Southern Arterial Motorway, Curletts Road, Blenheim Road, and Main South Road. The section from the Queen Elizabeth II Drive to Brougham Street is now a local road, while the remainder of the route forms parts of SH 74 and 76.

Re-routing also occurred in Whangarei in 1979, and Timaru, removing SH 1 from their city centres. The original route through Whangārei via Kamo Road, Bank Street, Water Street and Maunu Road was diverted via Western Hills Drive, which was built from 1977 to 1979, while the original route through Timaru via Stafford and King Streets was diverted via Theodosia Street and Craigie Avenue.

In 2010, the Taupō Bypass was constructed shifting the original SH 1 from the township and lakeside to the eastern outskirts of Taupō. The bypass starts at Wairakei near the existing SH 1/SH 5 intersection and finishes to the north of Taupo Airport. The concurrency with SH 5 also follows part of the bypass.

In the southern South Island, several particularly twisting sections of SH 1S have been rebuilt to remove sharp bends and to generally improve road conditions. These include stretches at Normanby, near Timaru; Waianakarua; two stretches at Flag Swamp and Tumai between Palmerston and Waikouaiti; and on the Dunedin Northern Motorway near Waitati. An extensive section between Allanton and the Taieri River was realigned during the 1970s.

=== Former spurs ===
SH 1A ran from Orewa to Silverdale. When the Northern Gateway Toll Road opened, part of SH 1A was incorporated into SH 1N and the rest had its highway status revoked.

SH 1F was the name previously given to the northernmost section of SH 1N – between Cape Reinga and the junction with SH 10. This section is no longer a spur and is now part of SH 1N.

Where SH 1 has moved onto a bypass, sometimes the former route is designated a spur until such time as the road can be transferred to the local council. All these routes are unsigned and appear as local arterial roads on maps.

- SH 1D was assigned to the former SH 1S route between Abbotsford and Saddle Hill in southern Dunedin, via the suburbs of Sunnyvale and Fairfield. The route was the bypassed Fairfield section of the Dunedin Southern Motorway in 2003.
- SH 1G was assigned to the former SH 1N route between Taupiri and Horotiu via Ngāruawāhia. This section was bypassed by Waikato Expressway in December 2013.
- SH 1H was assigned to the former SH 1N route through Huntly and Taupiri. This section was bypassed by Waikato Expressway in December 2022.
- SH 1J was assigned to the former SH 1S route through Belfast. This section was bypassed by the Western Belfast Bypass in December 2017.
- SH 1K was assigned to the former SH 1N route between Raumati and Peka Peka via Paraparaumu and Waikanae. This section was bypassed by Kāpiti Expressway in March 2017.
- SH 1P was assigned to the former SH 1N route between Peka Peka and Ōtaki via Te Horo. This section was bypassed by Kāpiti Expressway in December 2022.
- SH 1T was assigned to the Transmission Gully Motorway during construction, before the SH 1 designation was formally altered. It was revoked before the Transmission Gully Motorway opened in March 2022.

== Future improvements ==
State Highway 1 has been earmarked for several motorway projects most of which have surfaced from the National government's Roads of National Significance package announced in 2009.

=== Northland ===
The section of Marsden Point to Whangārei will be upgraded to a four lane expressway as part of the Roads of National Significance programme.

=== Auckland ===
The Puhoi to Wellsford motorway (Ara Tūhono) is one of the projects of the Roads of National Significance. Construction of the 18.5 km (11.5 mi) Puhoi to Warkworth section began on 8 December 2016 with the official sod-turning. The motorway runs west of the current SH 1 alignment, starting at the end of the existing Auckland Northern Motorway and terminating onto the existing highway at Kaipara Flats Road, north of Warkworth township. The new motorway opened in June 2023. The NZTA released its preferred alignment for the Warkworth to Wellsford section for consultation in February 2017. The motorway will run from the Puhoi to Warkworth section west of Warkworth northward, passing east of Wellsford and Te Hana to terminate onto the existing highway at Mangawhai Road, just short of the Auckland/Northland boundary.

Many ideas have come forth to create a Second Harbour Crossing over Waitematā Harbour to complement the aging Auckland Harbour Bridge. These include ideas for a second bridge, or a second tunnel with capacity for rail. At this stage, any meaningful progress is unlikely until at least 2025.

=== Waikato Expressway ===
As of October 2017, the NZTA is investigating extending the Waikato Expressway south of Cambridge 16 km (9.9 mi) to the SH 1/SH 29 intersection at Piarere, bypassing the existing highway around the shores of Lake Karapiro.

=== Levin to Wellington Airport ===
In February 2018, NZTA began investigation into extending the Kāpiti Expressway further northward approximately 23 km (14 mi) to just north of Levin, bypassing Levin and the villages of Ohau and Manakau. In December 2018, the NZTA selected the road's preferred corridor, bypassing Levin to the east alongside part of SH 57. Funding was approved by the government in January 2020.

Many inner city Wellington projects are also planned for SH 1 including duplication of the Terrace Tunnel and Mt Victoria tunnels. However these projects look uncertain as another planned project, the Basin Reserve Flyover failed to obtain the necessary resource consents and an appeal was rejected in the High Court.

=== Canterbury ===
NZTA are to extend the Christchurch Northern Motorway so that it bypasses the town of Woodend to terminate at Pegasus.

=== Other improvements ===
Several smaller projects are being undertaken to improve sections of SH 1. These include:

- Widening the Southern Motorway between Papakura and Drury South from four to six lanes. In June 2021 it was announced that funding for this project would be indefinitely deferred.
- Widening the Waimakariri River bridges on the Christchurch Northern Motorway from four to six lanes.
- Raising the highway and installing culverts in flood-prone areas between Oamaru and the Kakanui River bridge.

== Major junctions ==
=== North Island (SH 1N) ===
Territorial authority	Location	km	mi	Exit	Name	Destinations	Notes
Far North District	Cape Reinga	0	0.0				SH 1 begins
Auckland	Auckland CBD	427	265	424C-D	Central Motorway Junction	SH 16 (Northwestern Motorway) – Port, Waitakere, Helensville	Southbound exit and northbound entrance
Auckland	Auckland CBD	428	266	428	Central Motorway Junction	SH 16 west (Northwestern Motorway) – Waitakere, Helensville	Northbound exit and southbound entrance
Auckland	Auckland CBD	429	267	429A-B-C	Central Motorway Junction	SH 16 east (Northwestern Motorway) – Port	Northbound exit and southbound entrance
Waikato District	Pōkeno	477	296	477		SH 2 – Tauranga, Coromandel Peninsula	
Waikato District	Horotiu	535	332			SH 1C (Mangaharakeke Drive) – Hamilton, New Plymouth	
Waikato District	Tamahere	559	347			SH 1C (Cambridge Road) – Hamilton	
Matamata-Piako District / South Waikato District boundary	Piarere	594	369			SH 29 – Tauranga	
South Waikato District	Tīrau	607	377			SH 5 – Rotorua	
Taupō District	Wairakei	695	432			SH 5 north – Rotorua	SH 1/SH 5 concurrency begins
Taupō District	Taupō	706	439			SH 5 south (Napier Road)	SH 1/SH 5 concurrency ends
Rangitikei District	Bulls	925	575			SH 3 north (Bridge Street) – Whanganui	SH 1/SH 3 concurrency begins
Manawatū District	Sanson	931	578			SH 3 south (Dundas Road) – Palmerston North	SH 1/SH 3 concurrency ends
Horowhenua District	Ōhau	985	612			SH 57 (Kimberley Road) – Palmerston North	
Wellington City	Ngauranga	1,068	664	—	Ngauranga Interchange	SH 2 (Hutt Road) – Hutt Valley, Picton Ferry	
Wellington City	Rongotai	1,081	672			(Broadway) – Strathmore, Seatoun (Stewart Duff Drive) – Airport	SH 1 ends
Concurrency terminus; Incomplete access

=== South Island (SH 1S) ===
Territorial authority	Location	km	mi	Destinations	Notes
Marlborough District	Picton	0	0.0	Wellington Ferry (Interislander)	SH 1 begins
Marlborough District	Picton	1	0.62	(Kent Street) – Wellington Ferry (Bluebridge)	
Marlborough District	Blenheim	28	17	SH 6 (Nelson Street) – Nelson, West Coast	
Hurunui District	Waipara	284	176	SH 7/Alpine Pacific Triangle – Hanmer Springs, West Coast via Lewis Pass	
Christchurch City	Masham	344	214	SH 73 east (Yaldhurst Road) – Riccarton, City Centre; SH 73 west (Yaldhurst Road) – West Coast via Arthur's Pass	
Timaru District	Washdyke	501	311	SH 8 – Fairlie, Aoraki / Mount Cook	
Clutha District	Clarksville	765	475	SH 8 – Alexandra, Queenstown	
Invercargill City	Invercargill City Centre	923	574	SH 6/Southern Scenic Route (Dee Street) – Queenstown	
Invercargill City	Bluff	952	592		SH 1 ends
