= Flight training =

Learning to pilot an aircraft

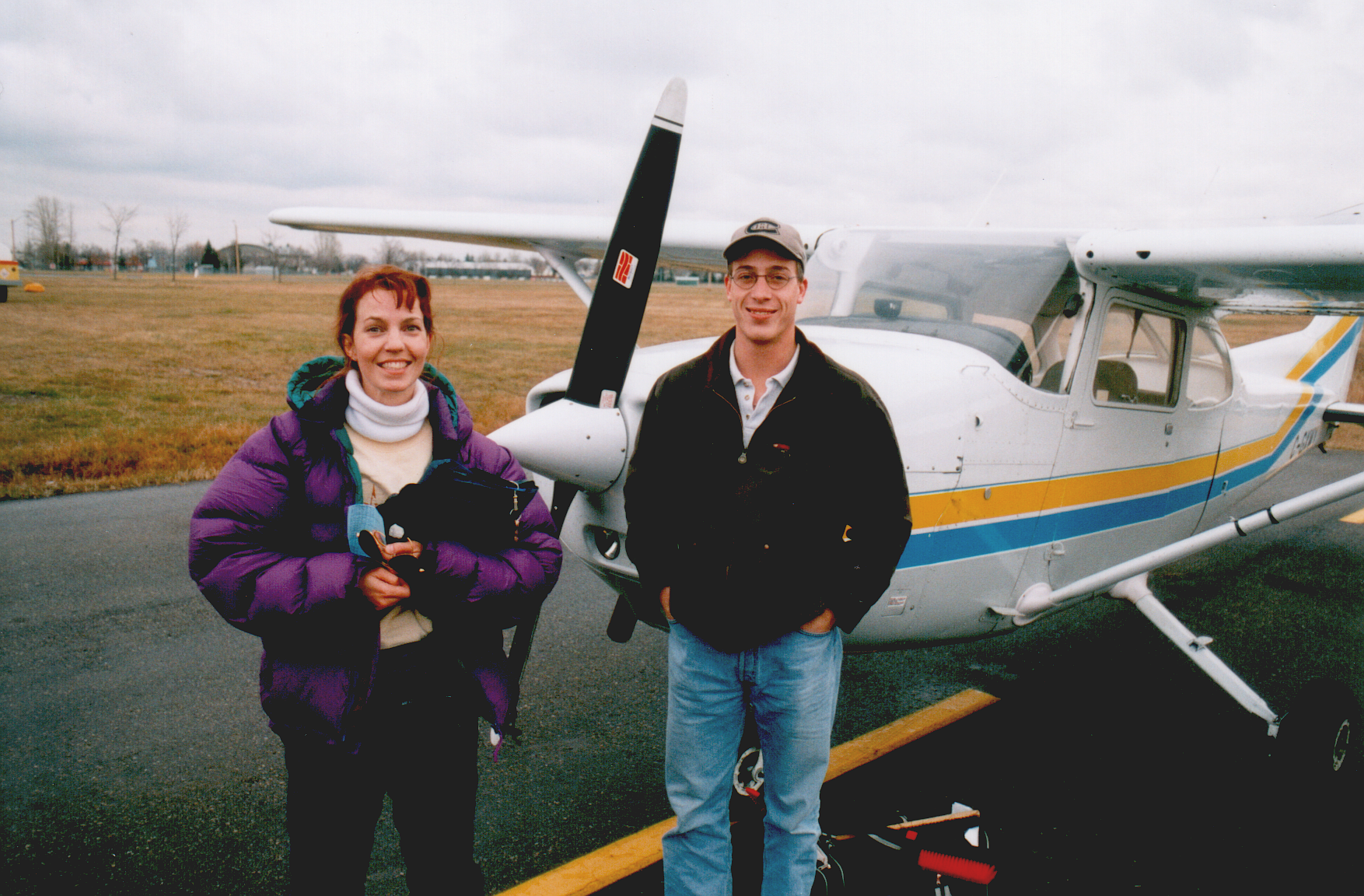
A Canadian aeroplane flight instructor (left) and her student, next to a Cessna 172 with which they have just completed a lesson.

Flight training is a course of study used when learning to pilot an aircraft. The overall purpose of primary and intermediate flight training is the acquisition and honing of basic airmanship skills.

Flight training can be conducted under a structured accredited syllabus with a flight instructor at a flight school or as private lessons with no syllabus with a flight instructor as long as all experience requirements for the desired pilot certificate/license are met.

Typically flight training consists of a combination of two parts:

- Flight Lessons given in the aircraft or in a certified Flight Training Device.
- Ground School primarily given as a classroom lecture or lesson by a flight instructor where aeronautical theory is learned in preparation for the student's written, oral, and flight pilot certification/licensing examinations.

Although there are various types of aircraft, many of the principles of piloting them have common techniques, especially those aircraft which are heavier-than-air types.

Flight schools commonly rent aircraft to students and licensed pilots at an hourly rate. Typically, the hourly rate is determined by the aircraft's Hobbs meter or Tach timer, therefore the student is only charged while the aircraft engine is running. Flight instructors can also be scheduled with or without an aircraft for pilot proficiency and recurring training.

The oldest flight training school still in existence is the Royal Air Force's (RAF's) Central Flying School formed in May 1912 at Upavon, United Kingdom. The oldest civil flight school still active in the world is based in Germany at the Wasserkuppe. It was founded as "Mertens Fliegerschule", and is currently named "Fliegerschule Wasserkuppe".

== Licences ==
The International Civil Aviation Organization sets global standards for pilot licensing that are implemented and enforced by a country's civil aviation authority. Prospective pilots must first meet their country's requirements to obtain a student pilot certificate, which is required for training towards a private pilot licence (PPL). They can then progress to a commercial pilot licence (CPL), and finally an airline transport pilot licence (ATPL).

Some countries have a light aircraft pilot licence (LAPL), but this cannot be used internationally.

Separate licences are required for different aircraft categories—for example, helicopters and aeroplanes.

In the United States, for example, a pilot adding a rotorcraft category helicopter rating to an existing certificate must complete flight training in specific areas of operation, including hovering maneuvers and autorotation, as prescribed by the Federal Aviation Administration.

== Type conversion ==
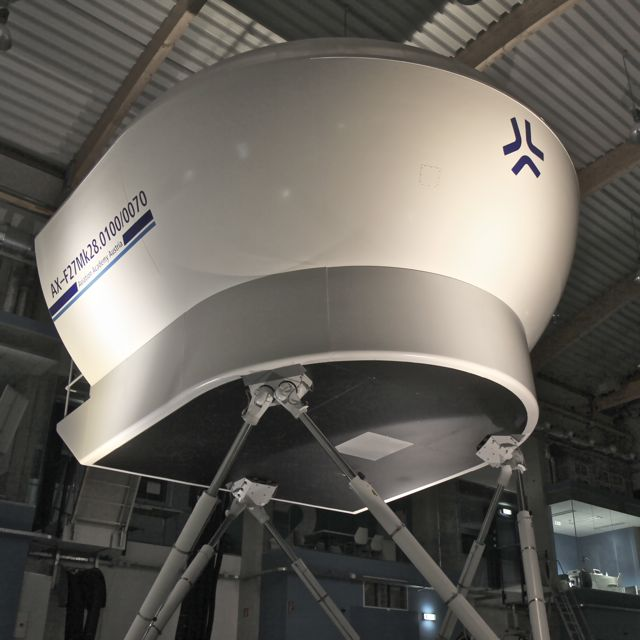
Level D simulator used for Type Conversions

A pilot who has flown one type of aircraft may need further training to be able to fly a different type of aircraft; this is called several names, including "type conversion", "conversion training", "type training", "getting an endorsement" and "getting a rating". Examples include training a pilot who has previously flown only single-engine aircraft to fly multi-engine aircraft; training a pilot of fixed-wing aircraft to fly a balloon or a helicopter; training a pilot to fly a more complex aircraft such as a turboprop aircraft, a business jet, a fighter or an airliner; training a pilot who has flown a particular fighter or airliner to fly a different type of fighter or airliner; and training a fighter pilot to fly an airliner. On completion of the training, a civilian pilot is awarded class rating or a type rating, also known as an endorsement, to their pilot license to allow them to fly the different type of aircraft. A type rating is for a specific aircraft type, for example a Dornier 328 turboprop airliner, Dassault Falcon 2000 business jet or MBB/Kawasaki BK 117 helicopter; while a class rating covers multiple types of similar design, for example twin-engine light aircraft fitted with retractable landing gear, gliders or single-engine seaplanes. Different countries have different rules and requirements.

== Instrument rating ==
A basic pilot license typically only allows a pilot to fly in visual meteorological conditions (VMC) in daylight, under visual flight rules. An instrument rating allows a pilot to fly under instrument flight rules (IFR). A night rating allows a pilot to fly in VMC at night (that is, outside of civil twilight). A pilot may be required to undergo specific training gain to gain either of the ratings, depending on the country's rules.

== See also ==
- Bárány chair
- Bachelor of Aviation
- Ground Instructor
- Integrated pilot training
- Pilot licensing and certification
- Pilot certification in the United States
- Pilot licensing in Canada
- Pilot licensing in the United Kingdom
- NEBOair
