= IACRA =

Online service for US pilots licenses

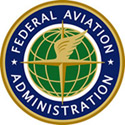
The Seal of the Federal Aviation Administration, which administers IACRA.

The Integrated Airman Certification and Rating Application, or IACRA, is an online service administered by the Federal Aviation Administration, which allows airmen to apply for pilots licenses, ratings and certifications fully online.

It is used by student pilots, flight instructors, commercial and airline transport pilots for all ratings, and replaced paper applications for airman ratings.

The system is designed to guide applicants through the process of applying for a new certificate or rating. It ensures that applicants meet the regulatory and policy requirements before submitting the application to the FAA. Through electronic signatures and automatic data validation, IACRA reduces errors and streamlines the processing time compared to the legacy paper-based system. Once an instructor signs off on an application for a student pilot certificate, a temporary certificate is issued immediately.

IACRA supports a wide range of users, including Certifying Officers, Designated Pilot Examiners (DPEs), Flight Standards District Office (FSDO) staff, and FAA Airmen Certification Branch employees, all of whom play a role in certifying and approving applications. Instructors and examiners are able to review and digitally sign applications within the system, and IACRA maintains a secure audit trail of each step in the application and approval process.

Applicants must register with IACRA and log in to begin a new application. The system stores previous applications and certifications, allowing users to track their certification history. IACRA also links with the FAA Airman Registry, ensuring that all certifications are up to date and properly recorded.

While IACRA is primarily used for pilot certification, it is also utilized for other types of airman certifications, including those for mechanics, dispatchers, and remote pilots (commonly referred to as Part 107 drone operators).

The platform continues to be updated and maintained by the FAA to accommodate regulatory changes and user needs.
