= Pilot licensing in the United Kingdom =

Pilot licensing in the United Kingdom is regulated by the Civil Aviation Authority (CAA).

== History ==
When the UK was part of EASA, pilots were licensed in accordance with EASA Part-FCL (Flight Crew Licensing). The UK also issued the National PPL (NPPL).

When the UK left EASA after Brexit, Part-FCL was adopted into UK law as UK Part-FCL. The UK continues to issue non-Part-FCL licences as well.

== Categories of aircraft ==
The categories of aircraft recognised in the UK include aeroplanes, helicopters, airships, sailplanes, balloons and gyroplanes.

UK Part-FCL licences are issued for a particular category of aircraft:

- Aeroplanes (A) (that can including touring motor-gliders)
- Helicopters (H)
- Sailplanes (S) - Part-SFCL
- Balloons (B) - Part-BFCL

UK licences are issued for:

- Light aircraft – (NPPL A)
- Microlights – (NPPL M)
- Gyroplanes (G)
- Balloons (B)
- Airships (As)

The abbreviations are combined with the licence level held, for example a Commercial Pilot Licence for Balloons can be written as CPL(B).

== Levels of licence ==
The UK currently grants several levels of licence:

- UK National Private Pilot Licence (NPPL)
- UK Private Pilot Licence (PPL)
- UK Airline Transport Pilot Licence (ATPL)
- UK Part-FCL Light Aircraft Pilot Licence (LAPL)
- UK Part-FCL Private Pilot Licence (PPL)
- UK Part-FCL Commercial Pilot Licence (CPL)
- UK Part-FCL Airline Transport Pilot Licence (ATPL)

The licence held by a pilot confers privileges on the sort of flying they may carry out—broadly, whether or not they may receive remuneration for doing so—and are independent of any aircraft type, or class, ratings included in the holder's licence and other ratings required for flying under specified conditions.

=== Gliding ===
Regulation of gliding has historically been through the British Gliding Association and its affiliated clubs. However, since 30 September 2025 pilots have required a CAA issued Sailplane Pilot Licence (SPL) to fly UK Part-21 sailplanes. The UK NPPL has close links with the gliding community and a gliding certificate can be converted.

Gliding does not follow the PPL-CPL-ATPL progression. An SPL holder may operate commercially once they have completed 75 hours of flight time or 200 launches after the issue of their licence, and have passed a proficiency check with an examiner.

=== Balloons ===
Balloon licensing does not follow the PPL-CPL-ATPL progression. The BPL (balloon pilot licence) is considered the equivalent of a Private Pilot Licence; however, BPL holders may operate commercially once they hold a commercial operation licence.

=== NPPL ===
The UK National Private Pilot Licence is a restricted form of the PPL introduced in 2002 for recreational pilots. It has a less stringent medical requirement than the UK Part-FCL PPL and a reduced flying syllabus.

The NPPL is administered by the National Pilots Licensing Group under supervision of the CAA. It is granted in two forms:

- NPPL (SSEA/SLMG) for Simple Single Engined Aircraft and Self-Launching Motor Gliders
- NPPL (Microlight and Powered Parachute)

The NPPL is a sub-ICAO licence meaning the holder is limited to operating only UK-registered aircraft and it cannot be used outside of the UK without permission from the regulatory authorities of any foreign jurisdictions whose airspace the holder intends to operate into. The holder, when operating under the privileges of the NPPL, is furthermore restricted to operations in accordance with VFR. The NPPL is more restrictive in respect of additional aircraft ratings which may be added compared with a UK Part-FCL PPL or LAPL.

The NPPL does not require an English language proficiency test.

=== LAPL ===
The light aircraft pilot licence (LAPL) is not an ICAO-recognised licence, and offers similar privileges to those of the NPPL. It is not recognised outside the UK and has three variants for Aeroplanes, Sailplanes and Helicopters.

It was introduced while the UK was a member of EASA, but since the UK left the EASA system, it is no longer equivalent to EASA LAPLs.

Since October 2025, as a result of UK CAA Licensing and Training Simplification (LaTS), the LAPL(A) is no longer issued by the CAA, although existing LAPL(A) holders can still exercise the privileges of that licence. They will also still need a LAPL medical issued under Part-MED.

=== PPL ===
The private pilot licence confers on the holder a privilege to act as the pilot in command of certain kinds of aircraft. The holder may not operate for valuable consideration, i.e. any form of reward, either financial or in kind. However, subject to national restrictions governing the soliciting of passengers to be carried on board an aircraft operated by a PPL holder, and in addition to several other requirements, a PPL holder may carry passengers who make a remunerative contribution toward the direct cost of the flights.

A flying instructor rating may be included, subject to requirements under UK Part-FCL being satisfied, in a UK Part-FCL PPL provided the applicant has successfully completed a number of additional examinations, training course and assessment. Such a person giving instruction in flying training may be remunerated.

Applicants for a private pilot licence must be at least 17 years old, hold a valid UK Part-MED Class 2 medical certificate, and have met the specified practical and theoretical training requirements laid down in UK Part-FCL.

PPL courses require at least 40 hours of flight instruction. This must include at least 25 hours of dual flight instruction, at least 10 hours of supervised solo flight time, and at least 5 hours of solo cross-country flight time. Up to 5 hours of instruction may be undertaken in an approved simulator. Pilots must also undergo a solo flight of at least 150 nautical miles for aeroplanes or 100 nautical miles for helicopters, including full stop landings at two aerodromes different from the departure aerodrome.

In addition to the practical training requirements, nine multiple choice theory examinations must be passed. The pass mark for every exam is 75%; the nine subjects are:

- Air law
- Aircraft general knowledge
- Flight performance and planning
- Human performance and planning
- Meteorology
- Navigation
- Operational procedures
- Principles of flight
- Communications

=== CPL ===
The commercial pilot licence allows the holder to act as the pilot in command of an aircraft for valuable consideration in single pilot operations. Applicants for the CPL should consult the UK CAA's website for up to date information on CPL course requirements.

The CPL also permits the holder to act as a co-pilot of a multi-crew aircraft for which they are qualified subject to their (i) holding a valid certificate of multi-crew co-operation, (ii) having successfully completed an approved ATPL Theoretical Knowledge Course together with thirteen ATPL theoretical examinations, (iii) having a valid instrument rating and multi-engine class rating.

Applicants for a commercial pilot licence must be at least 18 years old, hold a valid UK Part-FCL Class 1 medical certificate and have met the specified practical and theoretical training requirements laid down in UK Part-FCL. Different flight time prerequisites exist for each category of aircraft and are specified separately for starting training versus sitting the final test. The applicant must pass their CPL skills test within 36 months of passing their last CPL ground theory exam. An additional prerequisite for the CPL is a flight radio telephony operator's licence, which is normally included in the PPL.

Training can be undertaken with an approved training organisation (ATO) and courses are either (i) modular, as a standalone course taken after gaining a modular PPL or (ii) integrated, as part of one course which includes the PPL. The CPL is available in the aeroplane, helicopter and airship categories. The CPL skills test must be taken with a senior examiner (SE).

==== Aeroplanes - CPL(A) ====
Applicants for the CPL(A) must have least 200 hours of flying time (150 hours for applicants who have completed an approved course of aeroplanes) including 100 hours flying experience acting as the pilot in command (abbreviated to 70 hours for applicants who have completed an approved course of aeroplanes), 20 hours cross-country flying experience with at least one solo flight of not fewer than 300 nautical miles with full-stop landings at two or more different aerodromes, 10 hours instrument instruction of which no more than five may be instrument ground time and five hours of night instruction including five take-offs and landings if the privileges are to be exercised at night.

==== Helicopters - CPL(H) ====
Before commencing training, applicants must hold a UK PPL(H), a valid UK class 1 medical certificate, and have logged a minimum amount of flight time depending on which course they are taking. The ground theory course completed prior to flight training can be either CPL(H) or ATPL(H)/IR, with the latter allowing the applicant to train for an instrument rating - IR(H) - after the CPL.

===== Modular =====
Prior to starting training, applicants must have logged 155 total flight hours including 50 hours pilot in command (PIC), of which 10 hours must be cross-country. Training must include a minimum of 30 hours dual flight instruction, including 20 hours visual and 10 hours instrument training. If an applicant does not already hold a night rating, this is appended to the CPL course. The night rating includes at least 5 hours of night flight instruction, comprising 3 hours of dual instruction, which will include at least 1 hour of cross country navigation and 5 solo night circuits, each including a take-off and landing. The modular CPL(H) is often conducted during GMT months to allow for night training during airport operating hours.

===== Integrated =====
Integrated courses are available for the CPL(H), ATP(H)/VFR, and ATP(H)/IR licences. The prerequisites are different to those for the modular course.

==== Airships - CPL(As) ====
Airship commercial licences include the modular or integrated CPL(As), and the integrated CPL(As)/IR. Between April 2018 and March 2019, the UK CAA issued one EASA CPL(As) and no UK CPL(As) or PPL(As) were issued, renewed, or revalidated. As of September 2025, there were no ATO or PTO training organisations approved for airship flying training. It is possible to train for a Hot Air Airship extension to a balloon pilot's licence (BPL).

=== ATPL ===
In addition to the privileges of the CPL, the holder of an Airline Transport Pilot Licence may act as the commander of a multi-crew aircraft under IFR. An applicant for an ATPL must be at least 21 years old, hold a valid class 1 medical certificate, a type rating for a multi-crew aircraft and have completed the required theoretical and flight training. The ATPL is only available in the aeroplane or helicopter categories.

==== Aeroplanes - ATPL(A) ====
Applicants must have at least 1,500 hours of flight time. Where a simulator is permitted, no more than 100 hours (of which 25 may be in basic instrument training devices) may be credited towards the issue of the licence. Of the 1,500 hours, the applicant is to have completed 250 hours as PIC of which 150 may be PICUS (pilot-in-command under supervision), 200 hours cross-country of which 100 must be as PIC or PICUS, 75 hours instrument time of which not more than 30 may be instrument ground time, 100 hours night flight as PIC or co-pilot and 500 hours in multi-pilot operations in aeroplanes with a maximum take-off weight of at least 5700 kg.

The theoretical exams required for the ATPL cover 13 subjects:

- Air law
- Aircraft general knowledge: Airframe/Systems/power plant
- Aircraft general knowledge: Instrumentation
- Communications
- Mass and balance
- Performance
- Flight planning and monitoring
- Human performance
- Meteorology
- General navigation
- Radio navigation
- Operational procedures
- Principles of flight

== Ratings ==
In addition to their licence, a pilot will obtain one or more ratings. These are qualifications which allow a pilot to fly certain aircraft or in certain conditions. UK licences do not expire; however, to use the licence a pilot must have an appropriate rating.

=== Type and Class ratings ===
A class rating specifies a broad class of aircraft can be flown. A type rating permits flight only on a single type or aircraft or a group of closely related types.

To fly most light aeroplanes, a pilot must have a valid Single Engine Piston (SEP) or Multi Engine Piston (MEP) rating. These are class ratings. A Single Engine Piston rating lasts 24 months, when the pilot must pass a proficiency check with an examiner, or demonstrate meeting the minimum flight time and training requirements. The SEP (Land) rating is generally the first rating obtained by most pilots. This allows flight of single-piston-engined, non-turbocharged, fixed-pitch propeller, fixed tricycle gear, non-pressurised land aeroplanes (with a few exceptions).

SEP rating holders may undertake formal differences training from an instructor. There are seven categories of difference: tailwheel aircraft, retractable undercarriage, variable-pitch propeller, turbocharged engine, EFIS (Electronic Flight Information Systems), single level operation and cabin pressurisation. There is no formal test for any difference training; the training is signed off as satisfactorily completed in the pilot's logbook by the instructor conducting the training.

Other class ratings include Multi Engine Piston (MEP) landplane, Single and Multi engine piston seaplane, Single Engine Turbine (SET) and Touring Motor Gliders.

There is no Multi Engine Turbine (MET) class rating, as multi engine turbine and all jet powered aircraft require a type rating. To add these to their licence a pilot must undergo a course of training and pass an additional skills test. Differences training is also required for certain complex features within these class ratings.

Helicopter pilots hold type ratings for specific models of helicopter, which are normally valid for one year. Each type rating requires separate training and an annual proficiency check to remain valid. Helicopter pilots can only fly the specific models of helicopter for which they are type-rated.

=== Night rating ===
The Night Rating allows a pilot to fly at night. It does not expire. It is required for the ATPL. The course includes at least 5 hours of flight time at night, including at least 3 hours of dual instruction, including at least 1 hour of cross-country navigation with at least one dual cross-country flight of at least 50 km (27 NM) and 5 solo take-offs and 5 solo full-stop landings.

=== Instrument ratings ===
An Instrument Rating allows a pilot to fly in Instrument Meteorological Conditions (IMC), under instrument flight rules (IFR). Otherwise they must remain in Visual Meteorological Conditions (VMC) at all times. Instrument ratings are issued for aeroplanes, helicopters and airships. An IR is required to act as a pilot on a scheduled flight.

A single engine IR(A) course requires at least 50 hours of instrument time with an instructor. A multi-engine IR(A) requires at least 55 hours instrument time with an instructor. Pilots who already hold a CPL are credited with 10 hours, to avoid repetition.

The Competency-Based Instrument Rating course is a reduced course which takes into account previous experience. It results in a full instrument rating.

The Instrument Rating (Restricted) is a simplified version of the IR with fewer privileges. The IR(R) allows flight in IMC but only in certain classes of airspace and with restrictions on conditions for take-off and landing. It is a national rating, meaning it is not ordinarily recognised outside the UK. It had previously been agreed that pilots who already held the rating before April 2014 would be allowed to use it indefinitely within the UK and to transfer it to a new UK PPL as an Instrument Rating (Restricted).

=== Instructor and Examiner ratings ===
Flight Instructor and Examiner ratings extend the holder's privileges to act, respectively, as an instructor and to act as an examiner for proficiency checks and skill tests. These ratings both exist in a variety of forms whose domains, or ranges of privileges, are for specified aircraft operations.

== Medical certification ==
To use their licence, a pilot must have a valid medical certificate or make a medical declaration.

For UK Part-FCL licences, a UK Part-Med certificate is required. UK Part-Med was inherited from EASA Part-Med. For the LAPL, an LAPL medical certificate can be issued by some GPs. For the PPL, a Class 2 Medical is required, which can be issued by an AeroMedical Examiner (AME). For the CPL, a Class 1 Medical is required. Initial Class 1 Medical examinations must be carried out by an Aero-Medical Centre (AeMC), but revalidations can be issued by an AeroMedical Examiner.

For UK licences other than Part-FCL licences, a pilot may make a Pilot Medical Declaration (PMD) instead of gaining a medical certificate. PMDs are not automatically recognised outside of UK airspace.

== Radio licence ==
To operate an Aircraft Radio Station in a UK registered aircraft, the pilot must hold a Flight Radiotelephony Operator's Licence (FRTOL).

== Flight Navigator's Licence ==
The Flight Navigator's Licence allows the holder to act as flight navigator in any non-Part 21 aircraft. None have been issued since 2012.

== Conversion ==
It is possible to convert licences issued by other ICAO States ("third countries") to UK licences.

To sit the UK ATPL theoretical exams, the applicant is required to take a theoretical training course, unless they already hold a third country ATPL.

To convert a third country CPL, it is necessary to complete a course of flight training with a British air training organisation (ATO). The minimum flight training required depends on prior experience.

To convert a third country instrument rating, it is necessary to complete at least 15 hours instrument training with a British ATO.

== Statistics ==
In the United Kingdom in 2021, there were 9723 holders of the UK Part-FCL ATPL(A), of which 484 were women, and 5183 holders of the UK Part-FCL CPL(A), of which 339 were women. There were 13197 holders of the UK Part-FCL PPL(A), 1945 holders of the UK Part-FCL LAPL(A), 9275 holders of the UK PPL(A), and 4729 holders of the UK NPPL(A).

== See also ==
- Civil Aviation Authority (United Kingdom)
- Pilot licensing and certification
