= EASA pilot licensing =

Aviation in the European Union and the European Free Trade Association is regulated by the European Union Aviation Safety Agency (EASA). EASA specifies common standards for the licensing of aircraft pilots. EASA does not issue licences, rather licences are issued by member states. However, because the same standards are used, EASA licences are recognised by all member states.

Flight Crew Licensing is regulated by the document EU Part-FCL.

== Licences ==
The most basic licence is the Light Aircraft Pilot Licence (LAPL). Separate licences are issued for aeroplanes, helicopters, sailplanes and balloons. This is not a standard ICAO licence.

Private Pilot Licences are issued for aeroplanes (PPL(A)) and helicopters (PPL(H)). The SPL is issued for sailplanes (gliders) and the BPL for balloons.

A Commercial Pilot Licence (CPL) allows a pilot to fly for remuneration, and to fly in commercial air transport operations as co-pilot, or pilot-in-command of single-pilot aircraft.

An Airline Transport Pilot Licence (ATPL) allows a pilot to fly as pilot-in-command of multi-pilot aircraft in commercial air transport operations. It requires fourteen theoretical exams with a mandatory ground-school course.

EASA also issues the Multi-crew Pilot Licence (MPL). This allows a pilot to fly as co-pilot in a multi-crew aircraft. It can be upgraded to a CPL or ATPL with further training.

== Ratings ==
A type rating or class rating is necessary to fly a particular type or class of aircraft.

=== Instrument rating ===
An Instrument Rating permits a pilot to fly in Instrument Meteorological Conditions (IMC). The competency-based instrument rating is obtained with a reduced training course, but it cannot be used on high-performance aircraft. The en-route instrument rating permits the pilot to fly in IMC only during the en-route phase of the flight, not during take-off or landing.

An EASA instrument rating can only be issued after acclimatisation flying in EU airspace and a skill test in EU airspace.

=== Night rating ===
A Night Rating permits a pilot to fly at night.

== Certificates ==
A multi-crew cooperation (MCC) certificate and an advanced upset prevention and recovery training (UPRT) certificate are required to start a multi-crew type rating. An MCC certificate is also required for the issuance of an ATPL.

== Conversion ==
It is possible to convert air crew licences issued by other ICAO member states ("third countries") to an EASA licence. The applicant must have a valid third country licence and valid medical certificate. They must also hold a valid EASA medical certificate. They must pass all fourteen EASA theoretical exams. They must pass a radiotelephony exam, and an English language test.

=== CPL ===
Holders of a foreign CPL must take a theory course before sitting the theoretical exams.

=== ATPL ===
Holders of a foreign ATPL are exempt from the requirement to take a theory course before sitting the theoretical exams.

As long as the applicant meets the experience requirements, it is possible to take a flight test immediately with no flight training required.

=== Instrument rating ===
To convert a third country instrument rating, the flight test must take place in EU airspace, and must be preceded by acclimatisation flying in EU airspace.

== See also ==
- Pilot licensing and certification
- Joint Aviation Authorities
