= Aviation medical examiner =

Physician specialising in aviation medicine

An Aviation Medical Examiner or Aero-medical Examiner (AME) is a physician designated by the national aviation authority and given the authority to perform flight physical examinations and issue aviation medical certificates. AMEs are practitioners of aviation medicine, although most are also qualified in other medical specialties.

The International Civil Aviation Organization (ICAO) have established basic medical rules for determining whether a pilot or an air traffic controller is fit to act in that capacity, and they are codified in Annex 1 to the Convention on International Civil Aviation. However, most countries' aviation authorities have developed their own specific details and clarifications to be used in addition to – frequently more stringently than – the high-level standards prescribed by ICAO.

The military equivalent of the AME is the flight surgeon.

== AMEs in the United States ==
AMEs are private physicians, not employees of the Federal Aviation Authority ( FAA). Interested physicians apply through their regional flight surgeon's office. If selected and authorized, they are trained through a national process. A pilot can go to any examiner from a list of designated doctors and undergo an examination at any time. New AMEs are designated based upon the local demand for aeromedical certification services.

All AMEs may issue second-class or third-class certificates. Some AMEs are designated "senior aviation medical examiner", and may issue first-class certificates, which are required for pilots flying in air carrier operations. A specialized subset of AMEs, known as HIMS Aviation Medical Examiners (HIMS AMEs), complete additional FAA-required training to evaluate and monitor aviation professionals participating in the Human Intervention Motivation Study (HIMS) substance use disorder program; as of 2019, only 204 AMEs held HIMS AME certification nationally. An AME can no longer issue combined medical/student pilot certificates as the FAA now issues separate student pilot certificates as of April 1, 2016.

As of 2008, the FAA had approximately 3,927 civilian AME's located in 9 regions, 291 international AMEs located in 81 countries, and 350 federal AMEs (military, U.S. Coast Guard, NASA, and other agencies).

== AMEs in Europe ==
Member states of the European Union Aviation Safety Agency issue their own medical certificates. The local aviation authority in each state appoints AMEs, but all AMEs are recognised by all states. Medical records must be held by the same state which issues the pilot licence.

EASA regulations prescribe two standards of medical certificate. Class 2 is required for private flying on a private pilot licence (PPL) and the more stringent Class 1 is for professional pilots (commercial pilot licence (CPL) or airline transport pilot license (ATPL). An initial Class 1 medical examination must be performed by an Aero-Medical Centre (AeMC), but may be renewed by any suitably authorized AME.

A Class 1 medical certificate is valid for 12 months, unless the pilot is aged 40 or over and carries out single pilot commercial air transport operations carrying passengers, or is aged over 60, in which case it is valid for 6 months.

== See also ==
- Human Intervention Motivation Study
