= UPRT =

Aircraft pilot training

Upset Prevention and Recovery Training (UPRT) is a combination of theoretical and practical training given to aircraft pilots to enable the pilot to prevent, recognise and recover from unusual attitudes and unexpected situations.

In EASA states, all pilots undergoing training for the CPL, ATPL and MPL (multi-crew pilot licence) are given a basic UPRT course. Advanced UPRT (AUPRT or commonly just UPRT) refers to a regulated course of at least 5 hours theoretical instruction and 3 hours practical instruction. Since December 2019, this course is mandatory for all pilots before their first type rating course in multi-pilot operations. While the AUPRT course may be undertaken in an aerobatic aircraft, aerobatic training does not replace a UPRT course.

Class- or type-related UPRT addresses a particular class or type of aircraft.

In EASA states, airlines must include upset prevention and recovery training as part of their recurrent training, covering the syllabus every three years. In the United States, all Part 121 air carriers have been required to conduct UPRT since March 2019.

== Purpose ==
From 2010 to 2014, loss of control in-flight represented approximately 30% of fatalities in scheduled commercial air transport. UPRT was adopted to address this safety problem.

In addition to teaching techniques to recover from unusual attitudes, UPRT is intended to provide initial experience of g-forces that could be encountered in a commercial aeroplane, from approximately -1g to 2.5g, and to help a pilot gain angle-of-attack awareness. The psychological elements of the course include overcoming surprise and startle, developing counter-intuitive recovery skills, and developing self-confidence through upset recovery in a "real-world" environment.

== Techniques ==
One mnemonic for upset recovery is "UPRT":

- Upset
- Push
- Roll
- Thrust

On noticing an unusual flight condition, the pilot should first reduce the thrust, and push forward on the yoke to unstall the aircraft. An aircraft cannot be stalled at zero g. The pilot should then roll the shortest way to the horizon. Finally thrust can be increased and the aircraft stabilised.

Other mnemonics include "power, push, roll, recovered".

== Differences from early-stage training ==
According to the UK Civil Aviation Authority, UPRT recovery techniques should not be used for light aircraft. Light aircraft should be recovered from unusual attitudes with minimum height loss, with the technique "power, roll, pitch". The "power-pitch couple" in light aircraft is usually small, that is, the engine is positioned in line with the centre of gravity, so changes in power do not cause large changes in pitch. UPRT techniques are designed for jet aircraft, particularly with underslung engines where a large increase in thrust can cause the aircraft to pitch up (the "thrust-pitch couple").
