= Pilot licensing and certification =

Permits for operating aircraft

Pilot licensing or certification refers to permits for operating aircraft. Flight crew licences are issued by the civil aviation authority of each country, which must establish that the holder has met minimum knowledge and experience before issuing licences. The licence, along with the required class or type rating, allows a pilot to fly aircraft registered in the licence issuing state.

== Regulators ==
The International Civil Aviation Organization's "Annex 1 – Personnel Licensing" acts as the international minimum standard for licensing. However, states can deviate from these standards by notifying ICAO about the changes.

In the United States, pilot certification is regulated by the Federal Aviation Administration (FAA), a branch of the U.S. Department of Transportation (DOT). A pilot is certified under the authority of Parts 61 and 141 of Title 14 of the Code of Federal Regulations, also known as the Federal Aviation Regulations (FARs).

In Canada, licences are issued by Transport Canada.

In most European countries, licences are issued by the national civil aviation authority according to a set of common rules established by the European Union Aviation Safety Agency (EASA), known as Part-FCL (Flight Crew Licensing). EASA member states include all European Union member states, as well as the members of the European Free Trade Association, i.e. Liechtenstein, Norway, Switzerland, and Iceland, which have been granted participation under Article 129 of the Basic Regulation (Regulation 2018/1139) and are members of the management board without voting rights.

In the United Kingdom, aviation is regulated by the Civil Aviation Authority. The United Kingdom left the EASA system on 31 December 2020.

== History ==
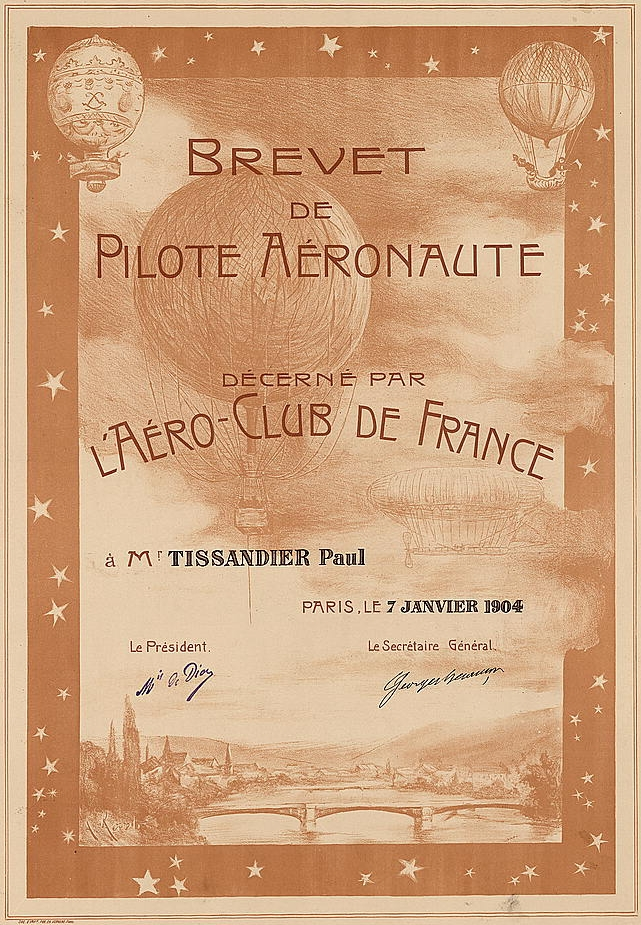
Balloon pilot's licence issued by the Aéro-Club de France to Mr. Tissandier

Pilot licensing began soon after the invention of powered aircraft in 1903.

The Aéro-Club de France was founded in 1898 'to encourage aerial locomotion'. The Royal Aero Club followed in 1901 and the Aero Club of America was established in 1905. All three organizations, as well as representatives from Belgium, Germany, Italy, Spain and Switzerland founded the Federation Aeronautique Internationale (FAI) in 1905 as an international governing body for aeronautics. However, certificates or ratings from them were not initially mandatory.

The Aéro-Club de France began issuing certificates in 1910, although these were awarded retroactively to 7 January 1909. The first certificates were to established pioneers, among them Frenchman Louis Bleriot, Henry and Maurice Farman (UK) and the Wright Brothers (US).

The Royal Aero Club in the UK also began the issue of its first certificates in 1910. Among the earliest recipients of the first aviation certificates were: J. T. C. Moore-Brabazon, who conducted the first flight by a British pilot in Britain; Charles Stewart Rolls, co-founder of Rolls-Royce; Claude Grahame-White, who flew the first night flight; and Samuel Cody, pioneer of large kite flying.

British and French certificates were recognized internationally by the FAI.

The Aero Club of America began issuing licenses in 1911, although these were not mandatory, and were more for prestige and show. The first recipients were Glenn Curtiss, Frank Purdy Lahm, Louis Paulhan and the Wright brothers. The requirement for an Aero Club ticket was to ascend in the machine and fly a course of a figure-eight at a given height. Individual states sometimes posed a mandate for a license but it wasn't a Federal cause until 1917. The first federal pilot's license was issued to William P. MacCracken, Jr. on 6 April 1927.

== General structure of certification ==
=== Aircraft categories ===
An aircraft category is defined by the International Civil Aviation Organization as a "classification of aircraft according to specified basic characteristics". Examples of aircraft categories given by ICAO are aeroplanes, helicopters, gliders, or free balloons.

A pilot licensed to fly aircraft in one category may not necessarily fly aircraft in another category, without an additional licence.

Categories in the United States are:

- Airplane
- Rotorcraft
- Glider
- Lighter-than-air
- Powered-lift
- Powered parachute
- Weight-shift-control

=== Licences ===
ICAO Annex 1, Chapter 2 specifies licences for pilots and for remote pilots.

For pilots, the standard ICAO licences are:

- Student pilot: Cannot fly solo without endorsement from a certificated flight instructor (CFI). Carrying passengers is prohibited.
- Private pilot licence: May fly for pleasure or personal business. Private pilots cannot be paid, compensated to fly, or hired by any operator unless it for search and rescue operations, a charitable event, or for aircraft sales.
- Commercial pilot licence: Can be paid, compensated to fly, or hired by operators and are required to have more training and experience than private pilots.
- Multi-crew pilot licence (MPL): Can act only as co-pilot in multi-pilot aircraft.
- Airline transport pilot licence: Can act as pilot-in-command of multi-pilot aircraft.

Separate licences are issued for different aircraft categories, such as aeroplanes, helicopters, gliders and balloons.

ICAO also specifies instrument ratings and flight instructor ratings.

For remote pilots, ICAO specifies student remote pilots, remote pilot licences, and RPAS (Remotely Piloted Aircraft System) instructors.

==== Licence details ====
Pilots of powered aircraft typically attain certifications in this order (with minimum time required in parentheses):

- Private pilot (35–45 hours of flight time, depending on the country)
- Instrument rating (40–50 hours of instrument time)
- Commercial pilot (200–250 hours of flight time)
- Airline transport pilot (1000–1500 hours of flight time)

Hours are cumulative and can often be earned concurrently. For example, after acquiring a private certificate, a pilot can attain an instrument rating with an additional 30–40 hours of training, if 10 hours of instrument time was logged during private training.

===== Private pilot licence =====
In the United States and the United Kingdom, to obtain a private pilot license, one must be at least 17 years old and have a minimum of 40 hours of flight time, including at least 20 hours (25 in UK) of dual instruction and 10 hours of solo flight. (Age requirements for gliders and balloons are slightly lower.) Pilots trained according to accelerated curricula outlined in Part 141 of the Federal Aviation Regulations or at a UK ATO approved for an accelerated course may be certified with a minimum of 35 hours of flight time.

In EASA states, a private pilot licence requires at least 45 hours of flight instruction. This must include at least 25 hours of dual flight instruction, at least 10 hours of supervised solo flight time, and at least 5 hours of solo cross-country flight time. Up to 5 hours of instruction may be undertaken in a simulator. Pilots must also undergo a solo flight of at least 150 nautical miles, including full stop landings at two aerodromes different from the departure aerodrome.

Private pilots may not fly for compensation or hire. However, they may carry passengers as long as the pilot has the appropriate training, ratings, and endorsements. Private pilots must have a current Class III medical certificate (Class 2 in the UK/EASA), which must be renewed every 24 or 60 months (depending on age). In a few countries (US/UK), pilots can make a personal medical declaration to self-declare their medical status. In addition, like all licensed pilots they must re-validate their single-engine piston class rating with a logbook endorsement every 24 months by successfully completing a flight review with a flight instructor (CFI).

Most private pilot certificates are issued as "private pilot: airplane single-engine land," which means the pilot may fly any single-engine, land-based airplane they are qualified in. A pilot is only qualified in the category and class of aircraft in which they successfully complete their checkride (for example, a pilot who takes a commercial pilot checkride in a multi-engine, land-based aircraft and passes, may only exercise the privileges of a commercial pilot in multi-engine, land-based aircraft; the pilot may not exercise the privileges of a commercial pilot in single-engine or sea-based aircraft without passing the appropriate parts of a checkride in those particular categories of aircraft).

===== Commercial pilot licence =====
Commercial pilots can be paid to fly an aircraft. To obtain a commercial pilot license in the United States, one must be at least 18 years old and have a minimum of 250 hours of total flight time (190 hours under the accelerated curriculum defined in Part 141 of the Federal Aviation Regulations). (Age requirements for gliders and balloons are slightly lower.) This includes 100 hours in powered aircraft, 50 hours in airplanes, and 100 hours as pilot in command (of which 50 hours must be cross-country flight time). In addition, commercial pilots must hold an instrument rating, or otherwise they would be restricted to flying for hire only in daylight, under visual flight rules (VFR), and within 50 miles of the originating airport.

In EASA states and the United Kingdom, a pilot undergoing modular training must have 200 hours total of which 100 must be pilot in command. Pilots undergoing an integrated course must have a minimum of 150 hours. Pilots must fly a qualifying cross country flight of at least 300 nautical miles.

In India, CPL applicants are also required to pass written examinations in Air Regulations, Aviation Meteorology, Air Navigation, and Technical General as specified by the DGCA.

===== Airline transport pilot licence =====
Airline transport pilots (ATP) must be at least 18 years old and have a minimum of 1,500 hours of flight time, including 500 hours of cross-country flight time, 100 hours of night flying, and 75 hours in actual or simulated instrument flight conditions. ATPs must also have a commercial certificate and an instrument rating. ATPs may instruct other pilots in air transportation service in aircraft in which they are rated. ATPs must have a current Class I medical exam (which is more stringent than Class II or Class III), which must be renewed every six months or one year (depending on age). Like all pilots, they must re-validate their certificates every 24 months with a flight review but U.S. airlines require training at least once every 12 months, at which time a test is conducted that satisfies this bi-annual flight review. After the 2009 crash of Colgan Air Flight 3407, Congress passed legislation, subsequently signed into law, requiring any pilot flying for a Federal Aviation Regulations (FAR) Part 121 airline (all United States major airlines and their regional affiliates), that requires three or more pilots to include new-hire first officers, must have had at least an "ATP certificate with restricted privileges" license except if you were licensed after July 31, 2013, then you must have an ATP certificate.

===== Multi-crew pilot licence =====
The Multi-crew Pilot Licence (MPL) is a licence which allows a person to act as co-pilot in a Commercial Air Transport operation. It is available in the United Kingdom and EASA states. It does not exist in the United States or Canada.

MPL pilots must be at least 18 years old. They must have a minimum of 240 hours of flying training, the majority of which may be in a full-motion flight simulator with 40 hours and 12 takeoffs and landings total required in an actual airplane before flying passengers (per JAR-FCL 1.120 and 1.125(b)), and 750 hours of classroom theoretical knowledge instruction. The licence is typically achieved in approximately 16–18 months total time from no flight experience to flying for an airline. It was developed by the International Civil Aviation Organization (ICAO), and the requirements were included in the 10th edition of Annex 1 to the Convention on International Civil Aviation (Personnel Licensing), which superseded all previous editions of the Annex on 23 November 2006. The MPL is a significant development as it is based on competency-based approach to training professional pilots. It represents the first time in 30 years that ICAO had significantly reviewed the standards for the training of flight crew.

The MPL licence is restricted to the specific airline that the training was completed with, until a conversion course is completed. The course is completed in one continuous course with an Approved Training Organisations (ATO) that has an agreement with the airline. A risk of this is that if the airline goes bankrupt or withdraws its job offer, the licence cannot be used and further training must be undertaken.

==== Country-specific licenses ====
The following country-specific licences are issued in addition to the standard ICAO licences. They are rarely recognised outside the issuing country.

===== Australia =====
In Australia, the Civil Aviation Safety Authority (CASA) issues the recreational pilot licence (RPL) for flying ultralights. The Recreational Aviation Australia, the governing body for ultralights, issues the RA-Aus pilot certificate. The two licences are equivalent and the RA-Aus pilot certificate can be converted into an RPL. The RPL is not recognised in other countries.

===== Canada =====
In addition to the standard ICAO licences, Canada issues the student pilot permit, gyroplane pilot permit, ultra-light pilot permit, and the recreational pilot permit.

===== EASA =====
EASA states issue the light aircraft pilot licence (LAPL), which permits holders to fly light aircraft, helicopters, sailplanes or small balloons.

===== United Kingdom =====
The United Kingdom issues LAPLs, and the National Private Pilot Licence, which permits holders to fly light aircraft within the United Kingdom.

===== United States =====
In the United States, ultralight aircraft, powered parachute, and weight-shift-control aircraft require no specific training and no certification. However, sporting groups give extensive training and certification for these aircraft.

The United States issues the student pilot certificate, which is required before a student pilot is allowed to fly solo.

The United States issues the sport pilot certificate. Holder are authorized to fly only light-sport aircraft, a category that was created in 2004. These aircraft are larger and faster than ultralights, and carry more fuel and often one passenger in addition to the pilot. Sport pilots cannot carry more than one passenger and are limited to daytime flying only. If an individual elects to receive additional instruction, some of the limitations may be removed. Medical certification is not required for sport pilots.

The United States also issues the recreational pilot certificate, which permits an individual to fly aircraft of up to 180 horsepower and 4 seats in the daytime for pleasure only.

To operate small drones commercially, the United States issues the Remote Pilot Certificate.

===== India =====
In India, the Directorate General of Civil Aviation (DGCA), a statutory body under the Ministry of Civil Aviation, is responsible for issuing pilot licences and overseeing standards of certification in line with ICAO guidelines. The DGCA grants Private Pilot Licence (PPL), Commercial Pilot Licence (CPL), and Airline Transport Pilot Licence (ATPL). A Student Pilot Licence (SPL) is issued when a student joins a flying school. To qualify for these licences, candidates must pass written examinations in core subjects including Air Regulations, Aviation Meteorology, Air Navigation, and Technical General.

=== Rating and certificates ===
To fly a specific aircraft, a pilot must have the relevant class rating or type rating.

A class rating is defined as "a classification of aircraft within a category having similar operating characteristics":

- Single-engine
- Multiengine
- Land
- Water
- Gyroplane
- Helicopter
- Airship
- Free balloon

A type rating rating is required for particular aircraft over 12,500 pounds, or aircraft that are turbojet-powered. Further logbook endorsements are required for high-performance (more than 200 horsepower), complex (retractable landing gear, flaps, and a controllable-pitch propeller), or tailwheel-equipped aircraft, as well as for high-altitude operations.

A night rating enables a private pilot to fly at night. It is a prerequisite for a Commercial Pilot Licence. In the United States, there is no night rating; it is a prerequisite for the Private Pilot Licence.

An instrument rating allows a pilot to fly in conditions of reduced visibility known as instrument meteorological conditions (IMC). When flying in these conditions, pilots follow instrument flight rules (IFR). The training provides the skills needed to complete flights with less than the VFR minimum requirements. In the US, all pilots who fly above 18,000 feet above mean sea level (MSL) (a lower limit of Class A airspace) must have an instrument rating, and must be on an IFR flight plan. This rating requires highly specialized training by a certificated flight instructor (CFI) with a special instrument instruction rating (CFII), and completion of an additional written exam, oral exam, and flight test. Pilots applying for an instrument rating must hold a current private pilot certificate and medical, have logged at least 50 hours of cross-country flight time as pilot-in-command, and have at least 40 hours of actual or simulated instrument time including at least 15 hours of instrument flight training and instrument training on cross-country flight procedures.

A flight instructor certificate permits a pilot to teach people to fly.

== Statistics ==
According to the FAA's U.S. Civil Airmen Statistics, there were 757,000 pilots in the United States in 2022, of which 72,000 were women. 281,000 were student pilots; 164,000 were private pilots; 104,000 were commercial pilots; and 167,000 were air transport pilots. 13,000 were rotorcraft pilots and 21,000 were glider pilots. 125,000 were flight instructors and 321,000 had instrument ratings. There were 304,000 remote pilots.

The United States Air Force had 19,100 military pilots in 2020.

In the United Kingdom in 2021, there were 9723 holders of the UK Part-FCL ATPL(A), of which 484 were women, and 5183 holders of the UK Part-FCL CPL(A), of which 339 were women. There were 13197 holders of the UK Part-FCL PPL(A), 1945 holders of the UK Part-FCL LAPL(A), 9275 holders of the UK PPL(A), and 4729 holders of the UK NPPL(A).

== See also ==
- Cross-country flying
- Joint Aviation Authorities
- Pilot licensing in Australia
- Pilot certification in the United States
- Pilot licensing in Canada
- Pilot licensing in the United Kingdom
- EASA pilot licensing
- Medical certifications for pilots
