= Flight 961 =

Flight 961 may refer to

- Ethiopian Airlines Flight 961, crashed on 23 November 1996
- Air Transat Flight 961, structural failure on 6 March 2005
