= Reem Al-Kuthairi =

Qatari pilot

Reem Hamad Al-Kuthairi
- Born: Reem Hamad Al-Kuthairi
- Occupation: Pilot

Reem Hamad Al-Kuthairi is a Qatari air sports pilot, paramotor pilot and former handball player. She is the first female air sports pilot in the Middle East. She also became the first woman in the Middle East to obtain a microlight pilot's license and also possess multiple air sports licenses. She is also the first gyrocopter pilot in the middle east

== Career ==
She graduated from Qatar University with a Bachelor's degree in the field of Sport Science and Physical Education.

She also played handball representing Qatar in international matches from 2001 to 2009. She was incidentally an integral member of the first ever Qatari women's handball team.

She pursued her interest in extreme sports, especially in paragliding, when she engaged in paragliding for the first time during a tour to France in 2008. She completed her first solo trip as a pilot in 2012, and she subsequently decided to obtain an international license in the UK.

She joined the Qatar Flying Club in 2012, and she subsequently became the first woman from Qatar to join the air sports field. She obtained the National Private Pilot License in 2014 in the UK and became the first woman in the Middle East to hold a microlight weight-shift control license.

She became the first Qatari woman ever to pilot a microlight plane. She eventually became the first Qatari female ever to own an aircraft registered with the Qatar Civil Aviation Authority and became the owner of the aircraft since 2016.

She obtained her APPI PPG license with Skymasters Flying Club in Qatar in 2020. In July 2021, she became Qatar's first qualified female paraglider pilot.

In July 2023, she also became the first gyrocopter female pilot in the middle east after obtaining the gyrocopter (PPL) private pilot license in the UK.
