= First solo flight =

Aviation term

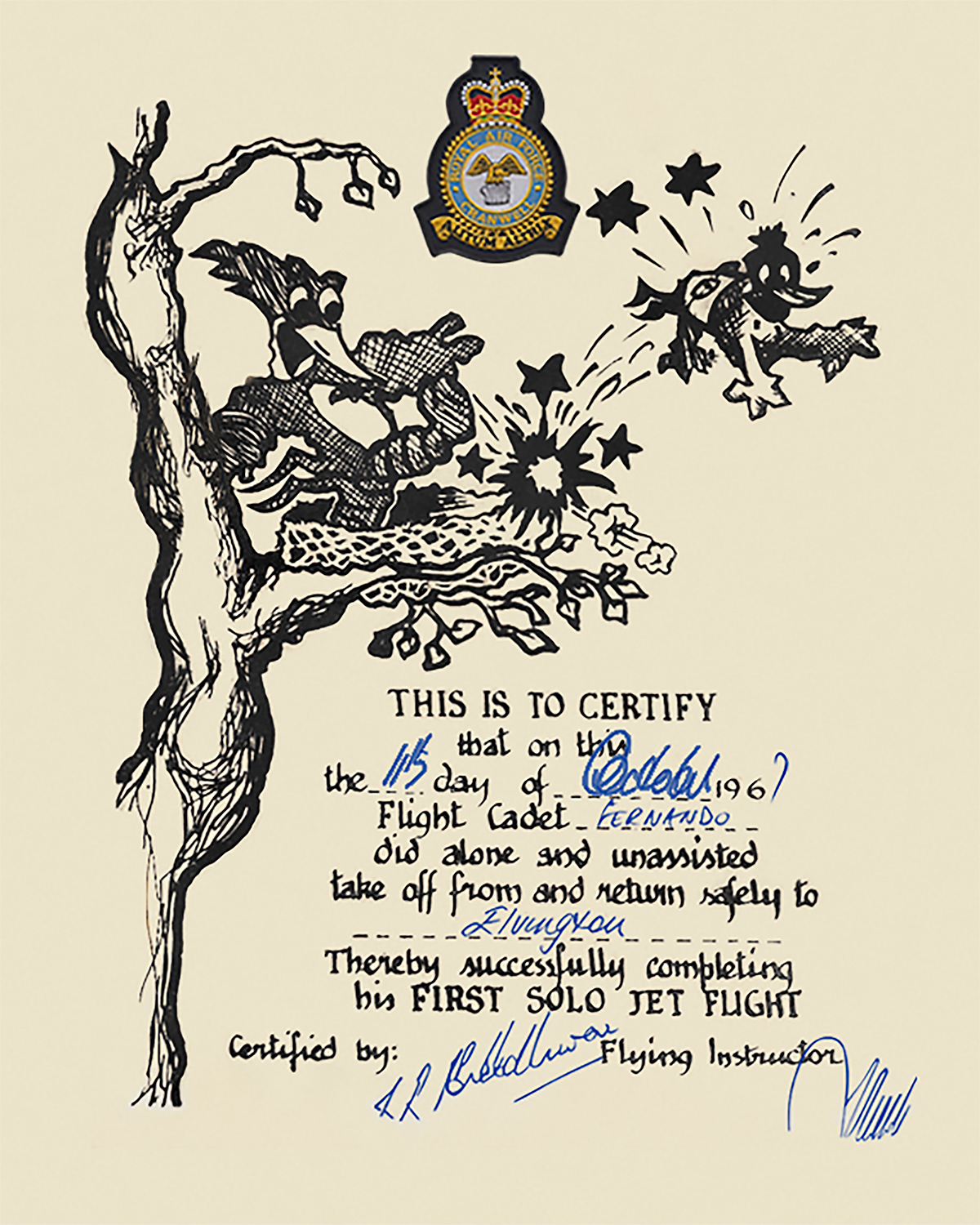
A Royal Air Force first solo certificate, from RAF Cranwell, 1967.

A first solo flight is when a student aircraft pilot performs a flight, from takeoff to landing, without an instructor aboard. Achieving this milestone is known as soloing. In a more general sense, a "solo flight" or "solo time" refers to any flight time when a "pilot is the sole occupant in the aircraft."

When piloting an aircraft solo, a pilot must not only fly and navigate the machine competently, but must also manage unsafe situations such as mechanical failure and bad weather.

== Requirements ==
Depending on the country, there may be a requirement for some minimum number of training hours to have been completed by the student pilot before they are allowed to solo. In most countries, it is assumed that such students will be familiar with (and may have to pass an examination on) the relevant air laws or regulations, and will have completed exercises in handling aircraft in normal conditions, and also what to do in the case of engine failure on takeoff, in flight, and before landing.

In the United States, for most aircraft, there is no FAA (Federal Aviation Administration) requirement for a minimum number of hours, but a student pilot certificate is required. Per FAR Part 61 SFAR 73 section 2, Robinson helicopters have a 20-hour requirement to solo. However, the regulations do require that a student pilot show competency in several specific skills to include, for example, the ability to forward slip.

In practice, competence is mostly a judgment call of the Certificated Flight Instructor (CFI) responsible for the student. Typically, it takes from 10 to 30 hours of flight time before a pilot has the instinctive feel of an aircraft to be safe flying solo in other than perfect (no wind) weather.

== Soloing ==
Solo shirt cutting

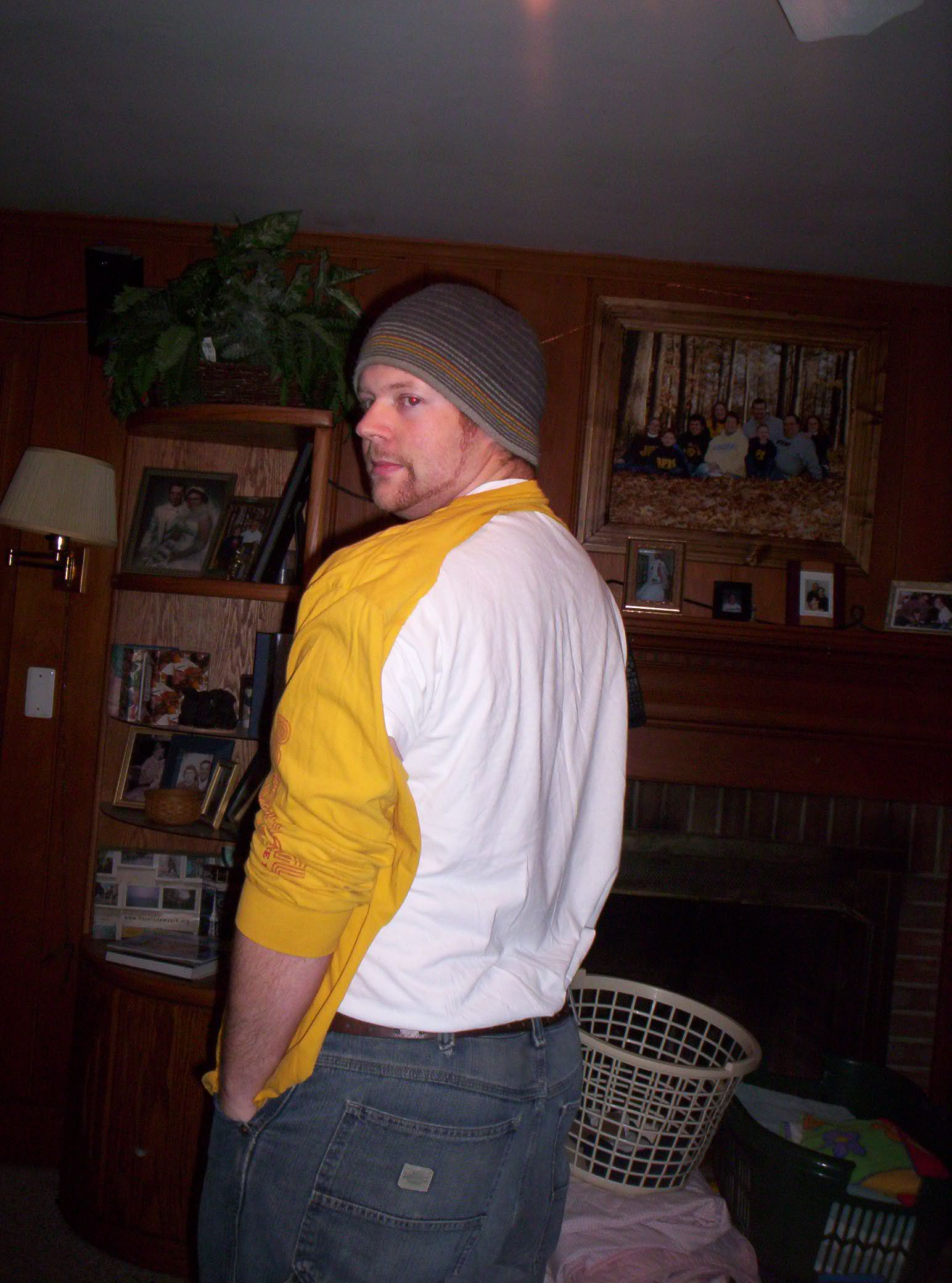
Student pilot after a solo flight, with the tail of his shirt cut off.

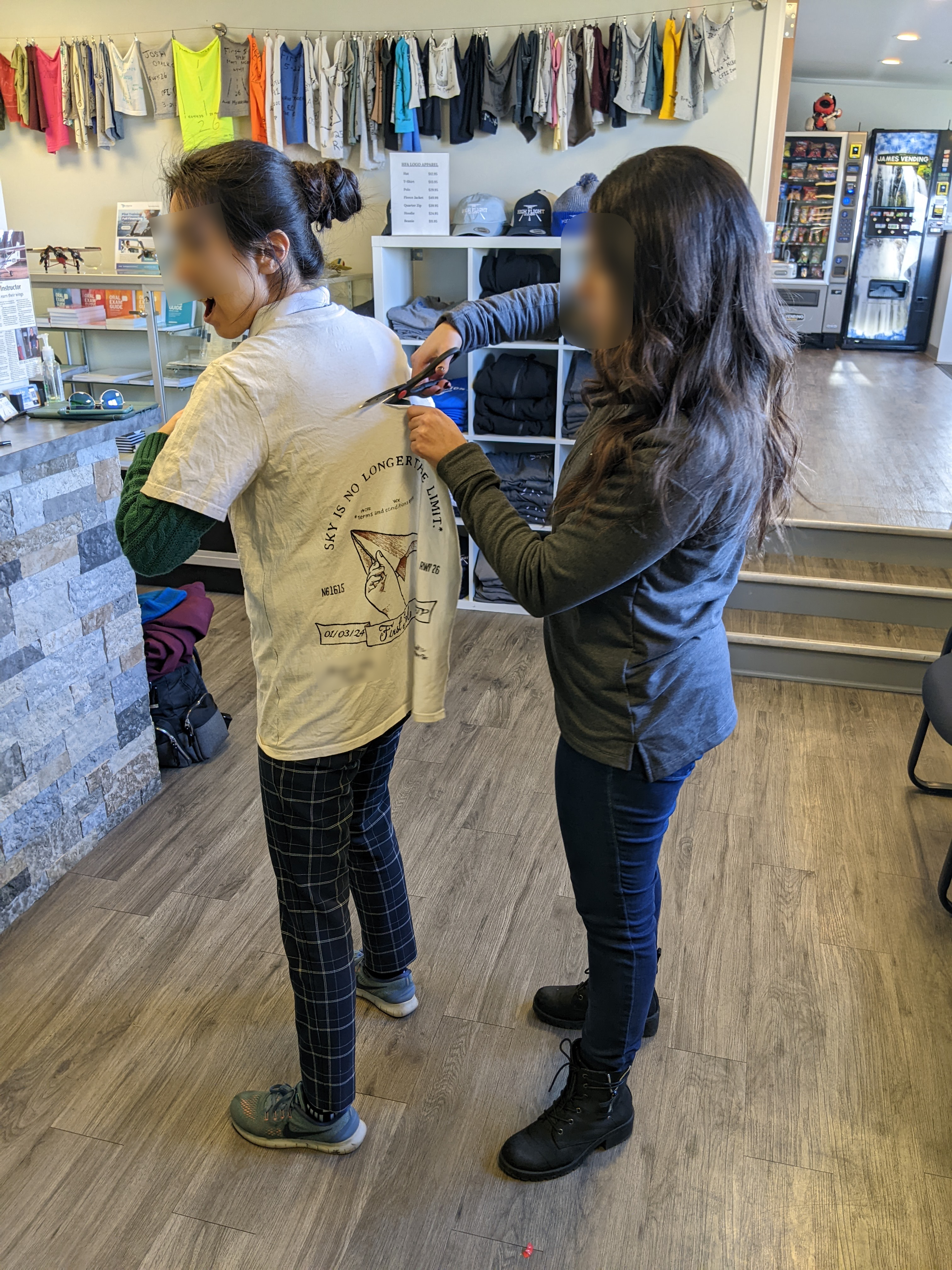
An instructor scissors off the back of a student's shirt. Other shirt cuttings hang on the wall.

Upon the completion of all legal and instructor requirements for proficiency, the student's flight instructor directs the student to fly three circuits of the traffic pattern, including landings, solo. During the first circuit of the solo, the instructor may supervise via radio in case the student pilot should need assistance or advice. When flying a glider the newly approved student may make more than one tow the first day though a single solo flight is adequate to earn the "A" badge as a glider pilot.

=== Traditions ===
Various traditions or rites of passage have developed around "soloing", including drenching the student with water, or cutting off the back of their shirt.

==== Solo shirt cutting ====
In the United States, one tradition includes the instructor cutting off the tail of the student's shirt following the successful flight. This tradition derives from early American aviation: before the advent of cockpit intercoms, the instructor would be seated behind the student with no reliable method of communication other than pulling on the student's shirttail. When a student demonstrates their ability to operate an aircraft solo, they no longer "need" their shirttail. To demonstrate this, the instructor cuts it off.

== Bibliography ==
- High Flight Academy Admin, 2018. Shirt Cutting: A Tradition for First Solo Flights
  - Blog post by High Flight Academy. https://www.highflightacademy.com/shirt-cutting-a-tradition-for-first-solo flights/#:~:text=Legend%20has%20it%20that%20this,back%20of%20the%20student's%20shirt.
- Aero Guard Flight Training Center. 2019 .Solo Shirt Cutting: An Aviation Tradition
  - Blog post by Aero Guard Flight Training Center. https://www.flyaeroguard.com/blog/solo-shirt-cutting/
- Airplane Academy. 2023. Why Do They Cut Your Shirt Tail Off When You Solo?
  - Set of blog like posts for things related to the First solo flight. https://airplaneacademy.com/why-do-they-cut-your-shirt-tail-off-when-you-solo/
