= List of aircraft upset factors =

The U.S. FAA lists factors of aircraft upset in the Airplane Upset Recovery Training Aid as follows:

- Turbulence causes:
  - Clear air turbulence
  - Mountain wave turbulence
  - Windshear
  - Thunderstorms
  - Microbursts
  - Wake turbulence
  - Aircraft icing
- Systems anomalies:
  - Flight instruments
  - Autoflight systems
  - Flight control and other anomalies
- Pilot-Induced
  - Instrument cross-check
  - Adjusting attitude and power
  - Inattention
  - Distraction from primary cockpit duties
  - Vertigo or spatial disorientation
  - Pilot incapacitation
  - Improper use of airplane automation
  - Pilot techniques
  - Pilot induced oscillation avoidance and recovery
- Combination causes:
  - Swept-wing airplane fundamentals for pilots
  - Flight dynamics
  - Energy states
  - Load factor (flight mechanics)
  - Aerodynamic flight envelope
- Aerodynamic causes:
  - Angle of attack and stall
  - Camber
  - Control surface fundamentals
  - Spoiler-type devices
  - Trim
  - Lateral and directional aerodynamic considerations
  - Angle of sideslip
  - Wing dihedral effects
  - Pilot-commanded sideslip
  - Crossover speed
  - Static stability
  - Maneuvering in pitch
  - Mechanics of turning flight
  - Lateral and directional maneuvering
  - Flight at extremely low airspeeds
  - High-altitude factors
  - Stall
  - icing
  - Automation during high-altitude flight
  - Primary flight display airspeed indications
  - Human factors and high altitude upsets
- Additional considerations:
  - Multi-engine flame out
  - Core lock
  - Engine rollback
  - Flight at extremely high speeds
  - Defensive, aggressive maneuvers
  - Situation awareness
  - Startle factor
  - Negative G-force
  - Use of full control inputs
  - Counter-intuitive factors
  - Previous training in non-similar airplanes
  - Engine performance in upset situation
  - Post-upset conditions

== See also ==
- Aircraft upset
