= Aircraft upset =

Flight attitude or airspeed limits exceeded risking loss of control

Aircraft upset is an unacceptable condition in aircraft operations in which the aircraft flight attitude or airspeed is outside the normally intended limits. This may result in the loss of control (LOC) of the aircraft, and sometimes the total loss of the aircraft itself. Loss of control may be due to excessive altitude for the airplane's weight, turbulent weather, pilot disorientation, or a system failure.

The U.S. NASA Aviation Safety Program defines upset prevention and upset recovery as pertinent to loss-of-control accidents due to aircraft upset after inadvertently entering an extreme or abnormal flight attitude.

A Boeing-compiled list determined that 2,051 people died in 22 accidents in the years 1998–2007 due to LOC accidents. NTSB data for 1994–2003 count 32 accidents and more than 2,100 lives lost worldwide.

== Overview ==
Loss of control as a factor in aviation accidents came into the spotlight with the 1994 crash of USAir Flight 427, which killed all 127 passengers and 5 crew members on board. In their report on the crash, the U.S. National Transportation Safety Board (NTSB) stated that prior to the crash they "had issued a series of safety recommendations over a 24-year period, asking the US Federal Aviation Administration (FAA) to require air carriers to train pilots in recoveries from unusual flight attitudes. Throughout this period, the Safety Board was generally not satisfied with the FAA's responses to these recommendations; specifically, the Board disagreed with the FAA's responses that cited the inadequacy of flight simulators as a reason for not providing pilots with the requested training. However, after the USAir Flight 427 accident and the October 31, 1994, ATR-72 accident involving American Eagle Flight 4184 near Roselawn, Indiana, the FAA issued guidance to air carriers, acknowledging the value of flight simulator training in unusual attitude recoveries and encouraging air carriers to voluntarily provide this training to their pilots."

Following those accidents, some carriers did implement their own voluntary training programs and the NTSB regarded those programs as "excellent".

In October 1996, the NTSB issued a formal Safety Recommendation (A-96-120), which requested the FAA to require all airlines to provide simulator training for flight crews which would enable them to recognize and recover from "unusual attitudes and upset maneuvers, including upsets that occur while the aircraft is being controlled by automatic flight control systems, and unusual attitudes that result from flight control malfunctions and uncommanded flight control surface movements".

In 2004, the FAA issued its first Airplane Upset Recovery Training Aid, which dealt with aircraft of more than 100 seats. The second revision of that document was released in 2008 and dealt with issues for aircraft in a high altitude environment. A third revision dealing with transport category aircraft was released in February 2017, and is available on the FAA's website.

In April 2015, the FAA issued an Advisory Circular describing a detailed program of Upset Prevention and Recovery Training (UPRT) for pilots. Although the advisory circular was directed primarily at Part 121 air carriers, i.e. airlines, it encouraged all airplane operators, pilot schools, and training centers to implement UPRT.

The FAA later mandated that after 12 March 2019 all high fidelity full flight simulators used by Part 121 air carriers must be specifically qualified to conduct Upset Prevention and Recovery Training intended to prepare pilots to recover from aircraft upset incidents, including advanced maneuvers.

== Detailed definition ==
From: The FAA's Pilot Guide to Airplane Upset Recovery.

An airplane upset is defined by the FAA as "an airplane in flight unintentionally exceeding the parameters normally experienced in line operations or training. This includes:

• Pitch attitude greater than 25 degrees nose up;

• Pitch attitude greater than 10 degrees nose down;

• Bank angle greater than 45 degrees; or

• Within the above parameters, but flying at airspeeds inappropriate for the conditions."

In other words, the airplane is not behaving normally or as intended, and accordingly will be approaching unsafe parameters.

The exact definition of aircraft upset varies between documents and training programs. For example, the British Royal Aeronautics Society states: "An upset is not necessarily a departure from controlled flight (i.e. a stall/spin) but it also includes abnormal attitudes and gross over/under-speed conditions." The Accident Investigation Division of aerospace technology company Calspan holds that the generally accepted industry guidelines for aircraft upset are incomplete in that they only take into consideration aircraft attitude and airspeed. Such expanded definitions are intended to more fully capture the maneuvers, events, conditions, and circumstances that the record has shown lead to loss of control.

== Jet upset ==
The related category of "jet upset"–where a jet airliner is 'upset' and ends up in a high-speed dive–is defined by Calspan as:

- an airplane unintentionally exceeding the parameters normally experienced in line operations or
- a control failure or disturbance that alters the normal response of the airplane to pilot input such that the pilot must adopt an alternate control strategy to regain and sustain controlled flight.

Normal flight parameters are defined as:

- Pitch attitude between 25° nose-up and 10° nose-down.
- Bank angle less than 45°.
- Airspeed versus maneuver loading within the normal flight envelope.

Jet upset was almost unknown in the days of piston-driven propeller airliners since they lacked the swept-back wings, jet engines, and movable horizontal stabilizers that are unique to jet airliners. With the phasing out of piston-driven propeller airliners, the phrase has gradually given way to "loss of control inflight", which includes, but is not limited to, the upset/high-speed dive type of accidents. The term jet upset was most heavily used in the 1960s and 1970s as the phenomenon was not well understood and was still being researched. Contemporary authors tend to group the phenomenon under loss of control.

There have been a variety of causes and contributing factors, in past jet upset accidents:

- February 1959: Pan Am Flight 115, a Boeing 707, upset and went into a high-speed dive while cruising over the Atlantic at flight level 350. Control was not recovered until reaching 6,000 ft. After landing safely at Gander, extensive structural damage was found, but there were only a few minor injuries. The Captain was in the cabin when the autopilot disconnected without adequate warning to the First Officer, who was distracted with a "howgozit" report form. It wasn't until the first officer felt the stall buffet that he realized they were descending rapidly and about to turn upside down. He was unable to level the wings. Fortunately, the Captain was able to return to the cockpit and strap into his seat while enduring significant G-forces. He took over the controls, levelled the wings, and pulled out of the dive.
- February 1963: Northwest Airlines Flight 705, a Boeing 720B, was hit with a powerful updraft while trying to fly between thunderstorms shortly after takeoff, and suddenly began climbing at 9,000 ft. per minute while climbing through 17,000 ft. The nose pitched up so high that the pilot reacted by using full nose-down trim on the horizontal stabilizer while simultaneously pushing the elevators to the full-down position. Then an equally powerful downdraft hit the plane and it went straight down in a matter of seconds. The pilot then pulled back on the yoke, moving the elevators to the full-up position. This imposed high G-load on the plane, resulting in binding of the horizontal stabilizer jackscrew such that it remained in a full trimmed down position. The plane came apart in the air, before hitting the ground.
- July 1963: United Airlines Flight 746, a Boeing 720-022 (C/N 18045, Registration N7213U), was upset while climbing through FL 370 near O'Neill, Nebraska, resulting in a high-speed dive until recovery at 14,000 ft. The plane encountered all of severe turbulence, downdrafts, and updrafts, with turbulence causing the plane to stall as it was approaching the coffin corner of its flight envelope. After that near disaster the Stall and Mach buffet margins were widened on all jet aircraft in order to preclude a plane getting into the situation of severe turbulence narrowing the "coffin corner" margins so severely that the pilots do not have time to avoid a high altitude stall.
- November 1963: Trans-Canada Air Lines Flight 831, a DC-8-54F, crashed 5 minutes after takeoff near Montreal, leaving a crater in the ground and killing all 118 on board. Impact speed was over 500 mph. Investigators found the pitch trim compensator actuator was in the extended position and the horizontal stabilizer trim setting was at 1.65 to 2 degrees nosedown (both were improper positions for that stage of flight). "The probable cause of this accident could not be determined with certainty. Certain possible causes which were put forward could not be ruled out: 1) icing of the Pitot system; 2) failure of the vertical gyro; 3) an unprogrammed and unnoticed extension of the pitch trim compensator."
- February 1964: Eastern Air Lines Flight 304, a DC-8, crashed into Lake Pontchartrain about 5 minutes after taking off from the New Orleans Moisant Airport and all 58 on board perished. Despite the water being only 20 ft. deep, only 60% of the wreckage was recovered because the breakup was so extensive. The flight data recorder tape was too damaged to help the analysis. Instead, the maintenance records of that plane and of other DC-8s were used to conclude that the pilots had trimmed the stabilizer to the full nose-down position to counter the excessive nose-up attitude that, in turn, was caused by a malfunctioning pitch trim compensator that had extended too far. Once the upset occurred, it was not possible to trim the horizontal stabilizer back to the nose-up position because of the severe G-forces generated by the pilots pulling back on the yoke after the upset.
- February 1985: China Airlines Flight 006, a Boeing 747SP, had its number 4 engine flame out while cruising at FL 410 over the Pacific Ocean. The captain ordered an attempt to restart the engine while remaining at flight level 410 and with the autopilot controlling the plane. He failed to use left rudder to counteract the asymmetrical thrust, and the plane rolled rapidly to the right and entered a high dive attitude and was unable to recover from the dive until emerging from the clouds at 11,000 ft. The plane exceeded the maximum operating airspeed (Vmo) twice during the dive. After recovery, the plane landed safely at San Francisco, but suffered major structural damage and two occupants received serious injuries.

== Related accidents ==
- 3 March 1974 Turkish Airlines Flight 981 (cargo door failure, caused severing of essential flight control cables).
- 4 April 1979 TWA Flight 841 (Improper manipulation of flaps/slats by pilots; the plane high dived from 39,000 ft. to 5,000 ft in 63 seconds. Landed safely.)
- 12 August 1985 Japan Air Lines Flight 123 (Improper repair caused bulkhead explosion, which severed all hydraulic flight control lines)
- 19 July 1989 United Airlines Flight 232 (Catastrophic engine failure caused loss of all 3 hydraulic flight control lines)
- 30 June 1994 Airbus Industrie Flight 129 (Control was lost after the pilot shut down one engine close to the ground, during a certification test flight)
- 8 September 1994 USAir Flight 427 (Control lost when the rudder PCU malfunctioned, causing the rudder to move in the opposite direction commanded by the pilot)
- 7 April 1994 Federal Express Flight 705 (During an attempted hijacking by employee Auburn Calloway, the crew of the DC-10-30F carried out numerous aerobatic techniques to disorient the attacker, pushing the aircraft to its limits.
- 31 October 1994 American Eagle Flight 4184 (While in a holding pattern, extensive ice accumulation produced a sudden reversal of the aileron controls, causing the plane to upset and dive into the ground.
- 11 December 1994 Philippine Airlines Flight 434 (Terrorist bombing leading to loss of flight control; landed safely)
- 12 November 2001 American Airlines Flight 587 (Overuse of rudder controls in response to wake turbulence from a preceding aircraft; all aboard killed, as well as five people on the ground)
- 22 November 2003 DHL Baghdad incident (Struck on the left wing by a surface-to-air missile shortly after takeoff from Baghdad airport; landed safely)
- 6 March 2005 Air Transat Flight 961 (Rudder detached in flight but crew regained enough control to land safely)
- 1 January 2007 Adam Air Flight 574 (Pilots inadvertently disconnected autopilot; all on board killed)
- 7 October 2008 Qantas Flight 72 (A pair of sudden, uncommanded pitch-down manoeuvres caused severe injuries to several of the passengers and crew; landed safely)
- 12 February 2009 Colgan Air Flight 3407 (stall during landing approach; all on board killed)
- 1 June 2009 Air France Flight 447 (Entered high altitude stall, impacted ocean)
- 28 December 2014 Indonesia AirAsia Flight 8501 (Non-standard reset of the on-board flight control computers led to a stall and uncontrolled descent into the sea; all on board killed)
- 9 January 2021 Sriwijaya Air Flight 182 (Autothrottle failure leading to pilot error and subsequent upset, impacted ocean)
- 10 March 2024 LATAM Airlines Flight 800 (Captain exerted pressure on the control column sensor due to accidental seat movement, causing a temporary loss of control)

== See also ==
- Boeing 737 rudder issues
- Inertia coupling
- List of aircraft upset factors
- Upset Prevention and Recovery Training
