= Air Transat Flight 961 =

2005 aircraft accident in Cuba

Coordinates: 23°08′22″N 81°17′10″W

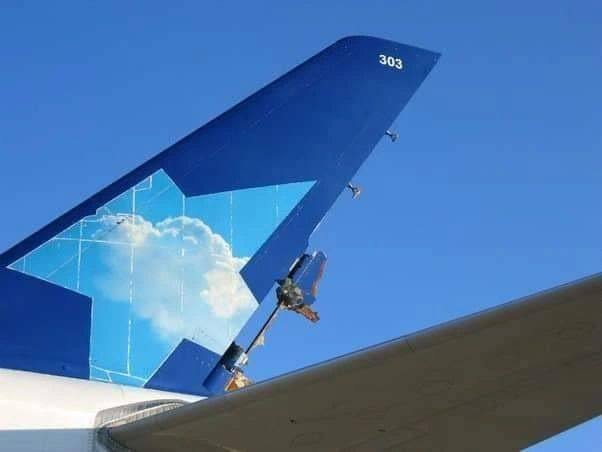
- Damage to the aircraft's tail after landing

Accident
- Date: 6 March 2005
- Summary: Structural failure of the rudder in flight due to a stress fracture
- Site: Juan Gualberto Gomez Airport, Cuba

Aircraft
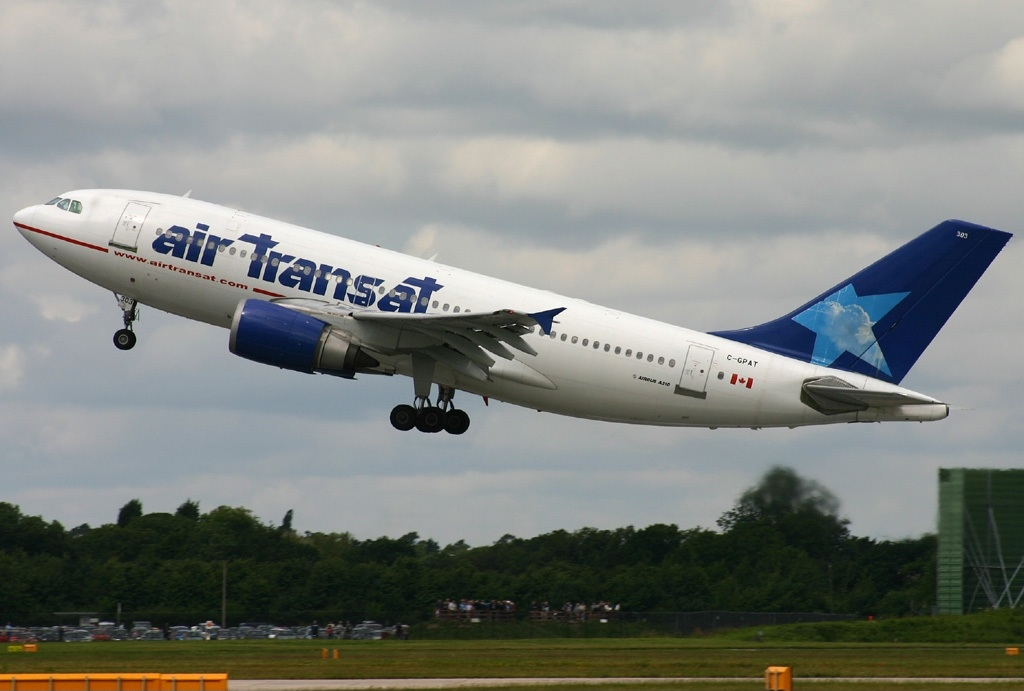
- C-GPAT, the aircraft involved in the accident, seen in 2004
- Aircraft type: Airbus A310-308
- Operator: Air Transat
- IATA flight No.: TS961
- ICAO flight No.: TSC961
- Call sign: TRANSAT 961
- Registration: C-GPAT
- Flight origin: Juan Gualberto Gomez Airport, Varadero, Cuba
- Destination: Jean Lesage Airport, Quebec, Quebec, Canada
- Occupants: 271
- Passengers: 262
- Crew: 9
- Fatalities: 0
- Injuries: 0
- Survivors: 271

Air Transat Flight 961 was an Air Transat flight operated by an Airbus A310 from Varadero, Cuba to Quebec City, Canada on March 6, 2005. The aircraft experienced a structural failure in which the rudder detached in flight. The flight crew were able to regain enough control of the aircraft to return safely to Varadero. As of March 2020, the Airbus A310-308 is no longer in service.

The investigation that followed determined that the manufacturer's inspection procedure for the composite rudder was not adequate. Inspection procedures for composite structures on airliners were changed because of this accident.

== Event ==
Flight 961 was a routine scheduled commercial flight carrying 262 passengers and 9 crew from Varadero, Cuba to Quebec City on March 6, 2005. It was operated by an Airbus A310-308 registered C-GPAT. It was delivered new to Emirates in 1992, but had been sold to Air Transat in 2002, when it was re-registered. At 2:48 am EST, Flight 961 took off from Varadero, Cuba. The flight climbed to its initial cruising altitude of 35,000 feet (11,000 m) and the flight attendants began the in-flight service. Then, suddenly, at 3:02 am, the aircraft began a dutch roll after a bang shuddered the aircraft violently. The plane climbed until the crew overcame the aircraft upset by descending. The crew attempted to divert to Fort Lauderdale-Hollywood International Airport, but Air Transat operations told the crew that returning to Varadero would be the more prudent option. There were no warnings on the flight deck indicating a rudder problem or a yaw damper problem. The plane landed safely at 4:19 am. Upon parking at the gate, the crew did a walk around inspection to identify the cause of the upset. The inspection revealed that the entire rudder had broken away from the vertical stabilizer of the aircraft.

== Cause ==
Although most of the cockpit voice recorder and flight data recorder were erased due to the long span of time in which the accident occurred, there were several findings as to the cause of the accident. The aircraft probably had a stress fracture in the tail that went unnoticed for several flights prior to the accident flight and the A310 does not have a mechanism in the tail that suspends the growth of the fracture(s).

The Transportation Safety Board found that inspection program of composite rudders was inadequate. In particular, the durability of the rudder was questioned. Air Transat Flight 961 provided new insights into rudder problems on Airbus A300-600, Airbus A300-600R, and Airbus A310 aircraft.

== See also ==
- Air Transat Flight 236
- American Airlines Flight 587: Another flight that lost its rudder—along with the rest of its vertical stabilizer
