= Light aircraft pilot licence =

European license for small aircraft

The light aircraft pilot licence (LAPL) is a pilot license allowing the pilot to fly small aircraft. It is issued in EASA member states and the United Kingdom. Unlike most other licences, it is not covered by the ICAO framework and is usually not applicable in other states or regulatory areas.

Since October 2025, as a result of UK CAA Licensing and Training Simplification (LaTS), the LAPL(A) is no longer issued by the CAA in the UK, although existing LAPL(A) holders can still exercise the privileges of that licence. They will also still need a LAPL medical issued under Part-MED.

== Privileges ==
Separate LAPLs are issued for aeroplanes, helicopters, sailplanes (gliders) and balloons.

For aeroplanes, holders of an LAPL may act as pilot in command of single-engine piston aeroplanes or touring motor gliders with a maximum certificated take-off mass of 2,000 kg or less, carrying a maximum of 3 passengers.

For helicopters, holders of an LAPL may act as pilot in command of single-engine helicopters with a maximum certificated take-off mass of 2,000 kg or less, carrying a maximum of 3 passengers.

For sailplanes, holders of an LAPL may act as pilot in command of sailplanes and powered sailplanes.

For balloons, holders of an LAPL may act as pilot in command of hot-air balloons or hot-air airships with a maximum of 3,400 m^{3} envelope capacity or gas balloons with a maximum of 1,260 m^{3}, carrying a maximum of 3 passengers.

== Requirements ==
LAPL applicants must be at least 17 years old for aeroplanes and helicopters, or 16 years old for sailplanes and balloons.

=== Recency ===
To use the licence, an LAPL holder needs to have, in the last 24 months, as pilot of an aeroplane or TMG:

- 12 hours of flight time as pilot in charge, including 12 take-offs and landings,
- refresher training of at least 1 hour of total flight time with an instructor.

== Legal basis ==
The LAPL was introduced in 2012. In October 2025 the UK LAPL(A) was superseded by the NPPL, with no new licenses issued by the CAA.

=== European Union and EASA member states ===
The EU LAPL is defined in the Regulation (EU) No. 1178./2011. Compared to the ICAO licence on the level of a PPL the requirements, skill tests, and privileges are lowered. The rules and requirements for the license are stated in Part-FCL of the Regulation (EU) No. 1178./2011.

=== United Kingdom ===
When the United Kingdom left the EASA system at the end of 2020, EASA Part-FCL was retained in UK law as UK Part-FCL. As such, the UK continues to issue LAPLs, however these are not compatible with the EASA LAPL.

== See also ==
- EASA pilot licensing
- Pilot licensing in the United Kingdom
