= National Private Pilot Licence =

The National Private Pilot Licence (NPPL) is a licence to fly United Kingdom registered aircraft within the United Kingdom. It is a more basic licence than the private pilot licence (PPL), and cannot be used to fly all aircraft. It can be used to fly basic aircraft such as vintage aircraft or kit-built aircraft. To fly many basic aircraft such as the Cessna 172, it is necessary to upgrade to at minimum a light aircraft pilot licence (LAPL).

There are three class ratings that can be included on the NPPL: Microlights, Self Launched Motor Gliders (SLMG), and Simple Single Engine Aeroplanes (SSEA). Each class has its own training syllabus. Applications for SLMG or SSEA ratings are made through the Light Aircraft Association. Applications for the Microlight rating is made through the British Microlight Aircraft Association.

Following an amendment to the UK Aircrew Regulations in 2021, the holder of a licence issued in accordance with the Air Navigation Order 2016 (as amended) (PPL(A) or NPPL(A)) with a valid SSEA/SEP or SLMG/TMG class rating(s) can now also fly a UK (G) registered Part 21 aeroplane or motor glider.

The NPPL continues to be a popular licence, with over 4,500 active licences as of 2021.

== Legal basis ==
The legal basis for the NPPL is the Air Navigation Order 2016. Authority to issue licences is delegated by the Civil Aviation Authority to the Light Aircraft Association and the British Microlight Aircraft Association. https://www.caa.co.uk/general-aviation/pilot-licences/uk-national-licences/nppl-national-private-pilot-licence/

== Privileges and limitations ==
NPPL holders may not:

- fly non-UK registered aircraft
- fly outside UK territorial waters except for the Channel Islands
- fly at night or under Instrument Flight Rules

Only UK registered aircraft of up to four seats and with a maximum indicated airspeed (IAS) of 140 knots may be flown. An NPPL pilot with the appropriate medical declaration may take up to three passengers (i.e. a total of four on board). This must not be for remuneration, although costs of the flight may be shared. Before taking passengers, pilots must have conducted three take-offs and full-stop landings in the same aircraft type within the preceding 90 days.

Following an amendment to the UK Aircrew Regulations in 2021, the holder of a NPPL(A) with a valid SSEA or SLMG class rating can now also fly UK (G-registered) Part 21 aeroplanes or motor gliders as well as non-Part 21 aircraft.

== Medical requirements ==
The NPPL has much less stringent medical requirements than a full PPL. The pilot must make a Medical Declaration that they are medically fit to the standard required to drive a car. From their 70th birthday, the pilot must make a new medical declaration every 3 years. For more complicated cases, an LAPL medical certificate is required.

== Training and validity ==
Seven theory exams must be passed, with the same syllabus and level as the PPL.

Flight training is available from most flight schools around the UK. Instruction is given by qualified LAPL flight instructors – there is no separate or reduced grading for NPPL instructors themselves. A minimum of 25 hours flying time is required for microlight aircraft, or 32 for SSEA aircraft, of which at least 10 hours must be solo. The solo flight time must include 4 hours of cross country which may include the solo qualifying cross country flight of at least 100 nm with two landings away. A further 2 to 3 hours flying time should be allowed for the two practical tests that follow.

Two practical tests must be passed:

- A Navigation Skills Test, which involves flying a distance of 100 nm. This is shorter than the 150 nm required for the PPL.
- A General Skills Test, where the pilot is required to demonstrate competence across the whole range of abilities for safe flying.

The licence does not require an English language test, but it does require Flight Radio Telephony Operators Licence (FRTOL) to operate radio equipment.

While licences are valid for life, class ratings must be re-validated every 2 years.

In order to remain current, NPPL pilots are required to:

- have flown for 12 hours within the previous 24 months
- have flown for 6 hours within the previous 12 months
- have had 1 hour of dual-instruction from a qualified instructor
- have a valid medical declaration

Alternatively, another General Skills Test may be taken.

With further flight training and examinations, the pilot can gain a full PPL.

== Conversion ==
An NPPL for SSEAs or SLMGs issued on or before 7 April 2018 can be converted to a light aircraft pilot licence (LAPL).

== History ==
The NPPL was introduced in 2002. European standardisation of the private pilot licence (PPL) by the Joint Aviation Authorities (later EASA) had increased the length of the PPL course, and the minimum medical fitness standard. There was a need for a simpler licence with lower costs and medical requirements, which was fulfilled with the creation of the NPPL.

When the United Kingdom was a member of the European Union Aviation Safety Agency (EASA), it adopted EASA Part-FCL (Flight Crew Licensing) as the basis for issuing most licences. The light aircraft pilot licence (LAPL) was introduced in Part-FCL in 2012. Since then, it has not been possible to fly certain aircraft with an NPPL. It was possible to convert an NPPL to an LAPL until April 2015. After the UK left EASA in 2020, Part-FCL was retained in UK law as UK Part-FCL. The UK continues to issue both NPPLs and LAPLs.

An NPPL for helicopters was discussed in CAP 804, however it is unclear whether any were issued. As of 2021, fewer than 6 were active.

== See also ==
- Pilot licensing in the United Kingdom
