= Multi-crew pilot licence =

Aircraft pilot license

A multi-crew pilot licence (MPL) is a pilot licence that permits an aircraft pilot to act as co-pilot of a multi-crew aircraft.

== History ==
The MPL is specified by the International Civil Aviation Organization (ICAO). It was created in 2006 to provide an alternative means for ab-initio students to become commercial air transport (airline) pilots. Requirements were first included in the 10th edition of Annex 1 to the Convention on International Civil Aviation (Personnel Licensing), published in November 2006.

The MPL is based on competency-based approach to training professional pilots. Previous training syllabi were task-based and hours-based. Calls in the 1990s for review of pilot training led to ICAO convening a Flight Crew Licensing and Training Panel (FCLTP) in 2001. This led to the MPL concept, which aims to take advantage of modern flight simulators and instructional systems design (ISD), and to provide training more appropriate to the highly automated environment of the modern flight deck.

Captain Dieter Harms, who was chairman of the management board of Lufthansa Flight Training and who has been dubbed the "father of the MPL", has stated the MPL programme was not introduced to deal with a pilot shortage, and was not introduced to reduce training costs.

According to IATA, as of March 2021, there had been 4,018 MPL graduates worldwide, of which 1,358 trained with Lufthansa and its subsidiaries.

== Implementation ==
In EASA states, the MPL is only issued for fixed-wing aeroplanes.

MPLs are not issued by the United States or Canada. ALPA, a trade union, opposes implementation of the MPL in the United States. Foreign pilots with an MPL may fly into the United States as co-pilot on a non-US registered aircraft, but they cannot operate a US-registered aircraft for a US carrier. However, foreign MPL students can attend US flight schools for flight training.

== Requirements ==
Applicants must be at least 18 years old, hold a Class 1 medical certificate, and have completed the theoretical training for an airline transport pilot licence (ATPL).

Training must include at least 240 flying hours, including training in a flight simulator. The majority of flight training may be in a full-motion flight simulator, with 40 hours and 12 take-offs and landings total required in an actual airplane before flying passengers (per JAR-FCL 1.120 and 1.125(b)). 750 hours of classroom theoretical knowledge instruction is required.

The licence is typically achieved in approximately 16–18 months total time from no flight experience to flying for an airline.

== Privileges ==
The MPL training course includes a type rating for a specific jet aircraft. For this reason it can lower the total cost of training. However, MPL holders are tied to a specific airline until they reach 1,500 flight hours and are able to gain an ATPL.

MPL holders are only qualified to fly as co-pilot in a multi-crew aircraft. They are not able to fly solo without additional training.

== Criticism ==
The course is completed in one continuous course with an Approved Training Organisations (ATO) that has an agreement with the airline. A risk of this is that if the airline goes bankrupt or withdraws its job offer, the licence cannot be used and further training must be undertaken. In 2008, nine cadets who had completed the course with Sterling Airlines were immediately made redundant. In 2014, Monarch Airlines terminated the training of six MPL cadets, however, the cadets were able to transfer their training to Easyjet. In 2020 during the COVID-19 pandemic, Easyjet terminated offers of employment to cadets midway through the course.

Until 2016, EASA MPL training was not complete until the completion of line training with a specific airline. This was not an ICAO requirement. On 6 April 2016, this restriction was removed.

The European Cockpit Association (ECA) criticised the MPL in 2013, for over-reliance on simulator training. According to ECA, the MPL course has "less flying time in the aircraft, very limited solo flight time, and less exposure to the real environment." The ECA noted that, as of 2013, no MPL trainee had yet graduated to captain, and there was limited data on the performance of MPL pilots.

By contrast, Rickard Wickander and Nicklas Dahlström of Lund University School of Aviation state that as of 2014 there is "no indication that the MPL should have any significant shortcomings in comparison with traditional airline pilot training... it should be difficult even for opponents of the MPL to ignore the increasingly large amount of positive feedback from host airlines that is now available."

According to ECA, authorities and Approved Training Organisation (ATOs) "lack understanding of the competency based concept". Wickander & Dahlström also question whether "there really is any MPL training provider who actually fully runs their training according to the CBT [competency based training] approach. Although there are many training provides who have this as their explicitly stated ambition the conclusion of this study is that there probably is not any who fully lives up to it."
