= Aircraft category =

Method of classifying aircraft

An aircraft category is defined by the International Civil Aviation Organization as a "classification of aircraft according to specified basic characteristics", for the purpose of personnel licensing. Examples of aircraft categories include aeroplanes, helicopters, gliders, or free balloons.

== United States of America ==
In the United States of America, there are seven aircraft categories for the purpose of certification of aircraft pilots:

- Airplanes
- Rotorcraft such as helicopters
- Powered lift
- Gliders
- Lighter than air
- Powered parachute
- Weight-shift control

Aircraft categories are also defined with respect to the certification of aircraft, to mean "a grouping of aircraft based upon intended use or operating limitations." Examples include transport, normal, utility, acrobatic, limited, restricted, and provisional.

== EASA ==
In EASA states, "Category of aircraft" means a categorisation of aircraft according to specified basic characteristics. Examples include aeroplane, powered-lift, helicopter, airship, sailplane, and free balloon.

== United Kingdom ==
In the United Kingdom, the categories of aircraft are:

- Aeroplanes
- Helicopters
- Airships
- Sailplanes
- Balloons
- Gyroplanes

Each type of licence is available for each aircraft type.

== See also ==
- Aircraft approach category
