= Student pilot certificate =

In the United States, a student pilot certificate is issued to a pilot in training, and is a prerequisite for the student to fly alone in the aircraft.

Prior to April 1, 2016, it could be issued by a medical doctor who is also an authorized aviation medical examiner (AME), in conjunction with the student's first medical certificate. Although the classification of the certificate does not matter, it is suggested that the student get a first-class certificate, as it helps in passing more complex tests in the future.

The student takes the application to their instructor, who then completes part of the application. All applications can be completed online through the Integrated Airman Certification and Rating Application (IACRA) on the Federal Aviation Administration (FAA)'s online portal. The student will fill out the remaining portion. The completed application is then sent to the FAA. After the prospective airman has been vetted by the Transportation Security Administration (TSA), the student pilot certificate will be mailed to the student. A temporary certificate is available after the form has been approved (approximately seven days after submission). This temporary paper certificate is used during solo flying and until the plastic card is received in the mail.

Earning a student pilot certificate is an indication that a solo flight might be approaching even though getting one is necessary and does not always happen right before one.

== Requirements ==
Obtaining a student pilot certificate has two requirements:

1. Be 16 years of age or older (14 years for gliders and balloons)
2. Be English proficient (You can read, speak, and understand English)

Although there are minimum ages for licenses, there is no minimum age for when flight training can occur. In the aviation industry, all time should be logged; therefore if a prospective student goes flying at 12 years old with proper educational guidance, the prospective student should log the time.

Private pilot licenses generally require a minimum of 40 hours. Commercial licenses generally require a minimum of 250 hours. In order to be considered for an airline position, most airlines require at least 1500 hours of total flight time.

Student pilot certificates allow students to fly the plane by themselves, with the instructor's permission. The time logged flying under the student pilot certificate is PIC (or pilot in command time), meaning all responsibilities are on the student pilot.

There are limitations to this student pilot certificate. Students can only fly under visual flight rules (VFR). Additionally, their instructor remains responsible for furthering the student's knowledge of aviation. This means students are unable to rent a plane and pilot it as they wish. Lastly, they may not fly for compensation or hire as a student pilot.

== See also ==
- Pilot certification in the United States – Student pilot
