= Commercial pilot licence =

Type of pilot licence

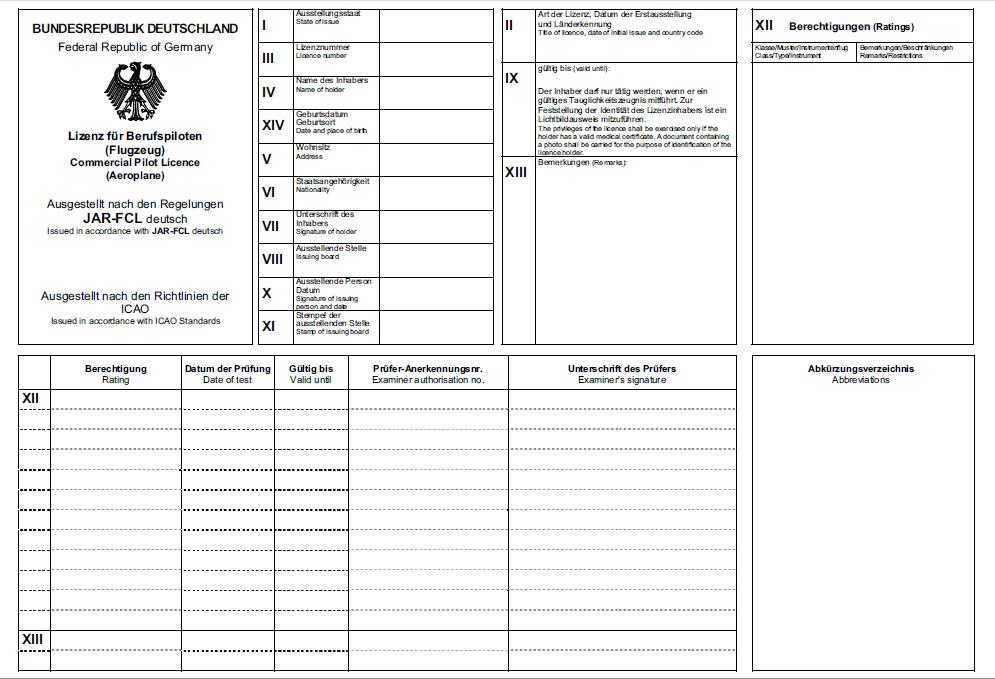
Example of a CPL(A) in Germany

A commercial pilot licence (CPL) is a type of pilot licence that permits the holder to act as a pilot of an aircraft and receive remuneration for their services.

Different licenses are issued for the major aircraft categories: airplanes, airships, balloons, gliders, gyroplanes and helicopters. Depending on the jurisdiction these may all be on the same document.

A CPL will typically have no expiry date. However, a valid type rating or class rating will be required to use it, as well as a valid medical certificate. A pilot's ratings may be listed on the licence, including the types of aircraft that can be flown (single-engine or multiengine), whether flight under instrument flight rules is allowed (instrument rating), and whether instructing and examining of trainee pilots can be done (instructor or examiner rating).

== Requirements ==
The basic requirements to obtain the license and the privileges it confers are agreed internationally by the International Civil Aviation Organization (ICAO). However the actual implementation varies quite widely from country to country. According to ICAO, to be eligible for a commercial pilot license, the applicant must;

- be able to read, speak, write, and understand English
- already hold a private pilot licence
- have received training in the areas of a commercial pilot
- successfully complete the relevant written exams.

In most European countries, aviation regulations are set by the European Union Aviation Safety Agency (EASA). The requirements and privileges of a CPL are specified in EASA Part-FCL. Applicants for a CPL (aeroplanes) must have completed a solo cross-country flight of at least 300 nm with full-stop landings at two airfields other than the pilot's airfield of origin.

In the United Kingdom, a pilot must have flown 200 hours for the issue of a CPL (150 hours for an integrated course), including 100 hours as pilot in command (70 hours for an integrated course). They must have completed a qualifying cross-country flight of at least 300 nautical miles as pilot in command, including full stop landings at two aerodromes different from the departure aerodrome.

In Canada, a pilot must be at least 18 years old, and must hold a Category 1 Medical Certificate. They must complete at least 80 hours of classroom instruction on a variety of topics, and pass a written exam with a score of at least 60%. They must also have logged at least 200 hours of flying experience. The experience must include 100 hours as the pilot in command, as well as specific experience at night, flying cross-country, and instrument time.

In India, the Directorate General of Civil Aviation (DGCA) requires CPL applicants to be at least 18 years of age, hold a valid Class 1 medical certificate, and complete a minimum of 200 hours of flight time, including specified hours as pilot-in-command, cross-country, and instrument flight. In India, the Directorate General of Civil Aviation (DGCA) regulates Commercial Pilot Licence (CPL) training and certification. CPL applicants are required to complete the prescribed flying hours, meet medical fitness standards, and undergo approved flight training at DGCA-recognized aviation academies.

== See also ==
- Airline transport pilot licence
- Commercial aviation
- Aviation meteorology
- Flight planning
- Pilot licensing and certification
- Pilot licensing in Canada
- Pilot licensing in the United Kingdom
- Pilot certification in the United States
- EASA pilot licensing
