= Airline transport pilot licence =

Class of civil aviation licensing

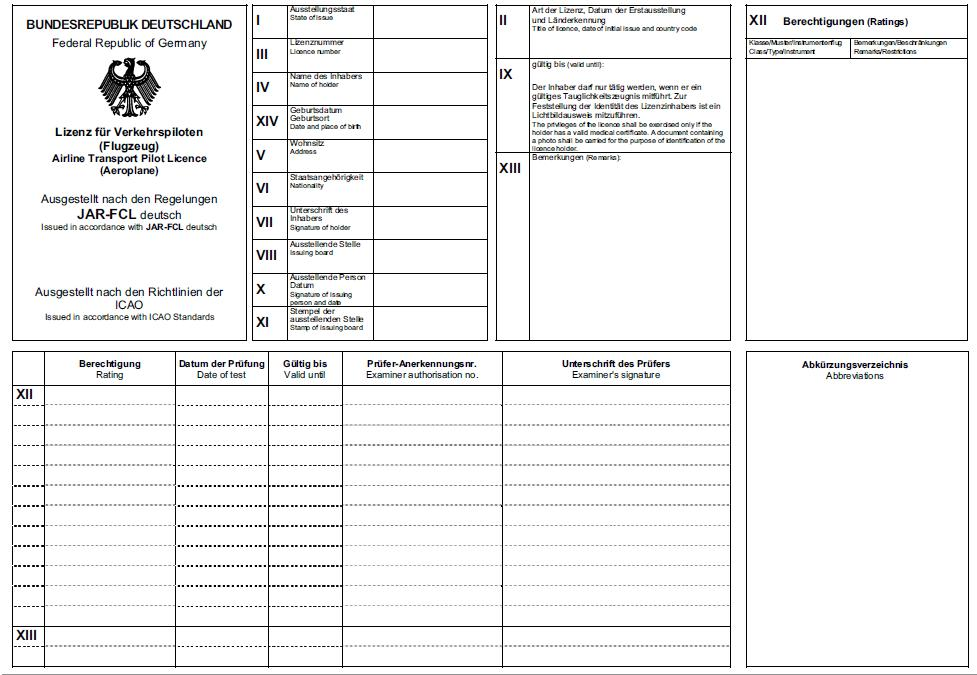

The airline transport pilot license (ATPL), or in the United States of America, an airline transport pilot (ATP) certificate, is the highest level of aircraft pilot certificate.

In the United States, those certified as airline transport pilots (unconditional) are authorized to act as pilot in command on scheduled air carriers' aircraft under CFR 14 Part 121. In EASA states and the United Kingdom, pilots must hold an ATPL before they can be pilot in command of a multi-pilot aircraft flown for commercial air transport operations.

== History ==
The scheduled air transport pilot rating was promulgated in the United States in May 1932. By 1937, it had been renamed the airline pilot rating before changing to airline transport pilot rating by the end of 1940.

== Context and privileges ==
Any pilot operating an aircraft for money must start by obtaining a commercial pilot license (CPL). This permits the pilot to carry out aerial work, such as crop spraying or banner towing.

However, in commercial air transport (CAT) operations, a CPL holder may only act as pilot in command of single-pilot aircraft or as co-pilot of multi-pilot aircraft. Commercial air transport is defined as "the transport of passengers, cargo or mail for remuneration or hire". To act as pilot in command of a multi-pilot aircraft, the pilot must hold an ATPL.

Like PPLs and CPLs, ATPLs do not expire. However, a pilot must hold a valid medical certificate and the appropriate class rating, type rating and/or instrument rating for the flying they intend to do.

== Requirements ==
=== EASA and United Kingdom ===
An applicant for an ATPL must already hold a CPL, a multi-engine instrument rating, and a multi-crew cooperation certificate. Alternatively, in EASA states and the United Kingdom, the applicant may only hold a Multi-Pilot License (MPL). ATPL holders who previously held an MPL are restricted to multi-pilot operations unless they complete a CPL skill test and other requirements.

For aeroplanes, the applicant must have 1500 hours as a pilot of airplanes, including 500 hours in multi-pilot operations on airplanes, and a minimum number of hours as pilot in command (PIC) and/or pilot in command under supervision (PICUS). There are minimum hour requirements for cross-country flight, instrument flight, and night flight. Time as pilot of helicopters, sailplanes and touring motor gliders may be partially cross-credited. For helicopters, the applicant must have 1000 hours as a pilot of helicopters, as well as other hour requirements. Time as a pilot of aeroplanes may be cross-credited up to 50%.

The applicant must pass a skill test, demonstrating their ability to perform procedures and manoeuvres, as PIC of a multi-pilot airplane under IFR. The applicant must hold a type rating for the aircraft used in the skill test. The skill test may be carried out in a suitably qualified full flight simulator.

The minimum age to gain an ATPL is 21 years, and holders must have a Class 1 medical certificate. There are separate ATPL licences for aeroplanes and helicopters.

From the age of 60-64, pilots may only act as part of a multi-pilot crew in commercial air transport operations, however they may continue to act as Pilot In Command. From the age of 65, they may no longer act as a pilot in commercial air transport operations (from age 70 for balloons and sailplanes).

==== Theoretical examination ====
The EASA ATPL requires candidates to pass 13 separate theoretical exams which are often taken over 3 modules, with a six-month residential or twelve-month distance-learning course mandatory during this phase.

In EASA states and the United Kingdom, the 13 theoretical subjects included in the examination of ATPL applicants are:

- Air law
- Aircraft General Knowledge — Airframe/Systems/Powerplants/Electrics
- Instrumentation
- Mass and Balance
- Performance
- Flight Planning and Monitoring
- Human Performance
- Meteorology
- General navigation
- Radio navigation
- Operational Procedures
- Principles of Flight
- Communications

All exams must be passed within an 18-month period. A CPL and/or Instrument Rating must then be gained within 36 months. Provided that a CPL and IR are achieved, ATPL examination results are accepted for seven years after the most recent validity date of the IR entered in the CPL.

ATPL exams are acceptable for the issue of a CPL, so most pilots skip the CPL exams and take their ATPL exams before they obtain their CPL.

A CPL held by a pilot who has completed all ATPL theoretical exams is popularly known as a "frozen ATPL", although this term has no legal significance.

=== United States ===
After the crash of Colgan Air Flight 3407, an air transport certificate became a requirement for all commercial air transport pilots in the United States. This effectively raised the number of flight hours required for new commercial pilots from 250 to 1,500. Applicants with military or university flying training can apply for a restricted airline transport pilot certificate (R-ATP) with a reduced number of hours.

To be eligible to take the Federal Aviation Administration's (FAA) ATP practical test, the candidate must have at least 1,500 hours of experience in aircraft, including 250 hours as a pilot-in-command (PIC), and be at least age 23.

An R-ATP (which allow the holder to perform only second-in-command duties) may be granted to individuals that meet one of the following criteria:

- Military pilot with 750 hours of total flight time and over 21 years old.
- Graduates with a four-year degree in aviation from an approved university with 1,000 hours of total flight time and are over 21.
- Graduates with a two-year degree in aviation with 1,250 hours of total flight time and are over 21.
- Pilots with 1,500 hours total flight time and are over 21.

The pilot can remove the restriction once they have passed 1,500 hours of total flight time and are over 23.

The FAA ATP flight test can be taken in a light piston aircraft with 1,500 hours of experience, however, the FAA additionally requires a 'Type Rating' to pilot any large or jet-powered aircraft. Most FAA-certified pilots earn their ATP certificate and Type Rating (aircraft specific) simultaneously via the successful completion of a part 121 airline training program and type rating check-ride.

While pilot certificates in the United States do not expire, pilots must undergo periodic flight reviews to ensure they are safe to operate aircraft.

== See also ==
- Pilot licensing and certification
- Pilot certification in the United States
- Pilot licensing in Canada
- Pilot licensing in the United Kingdom
- EASA pilot licensing
