= List of aviation, avionics, aerospace and aeronautical abbreviations =

Below are abbreviations used in aviation, avionics, aerospace, and aeronautics.

== A ==
Abbreviation	Term	Notes
A/A	Air to air TACAN function	
A/C	Aircraft	
AC	Altocumulus	Cloud type
ACC	Altocumulus castellanus	Cloud type
ACC	Area Control Centre	
A/D	Aerodrome	
ACT	Alternative Configuration Tool	
A/F	Autofeather	
A/FD	Airport/Facility Directory	
A/P	Autopilot	
AAE	Above aerodrome elevation	In aviation, above aerodrome level (AAL), or above aerodrome elevation (AAE), denotes that an altitude is given above the nearest aerodrome or airport.
AAIB	Air Accident Investigation Bureau/Branch/Board	(Malaysia, Mongolia, Singapore, United Kingdom, Iceland, India, Switzerland)
AAIM	Aircraft Autonomous Integrity Monitoring	
AAO	Assumed adverse obstacle	
AAS	Airport advisory service	
AC	Advisory circular	Information and guidance publication
ACAM	Aircraft continuous airworthiness monitoring	
ACARS	Aircraft Communications Addressing and Reporting System	
ACAS	Airborne collision avoidance system	
ACC	Area control centre	
ACC	Active clearance control	Turbine engine system
ACC	Accessory	In gas turbine engine
ACE	Actuator control electronics	
ACFT	Aircraft	
ACI	Airports Council International	
ACLS	Automatic carrier landing system	Aircraft carrier operations
ACM	Air cycle machine	Part of A/C air conditioning system
ACMS	Aircraft condition monitoring system	
ACP	Audio Control Panel	
ACR	Avionic Communication Router	
ACS^{1}	Airman Certification Standards	FAA pilot testing
ACS^{2}	Audio control system	
ACU^{1}	Air conditioning (or cooling) unit	
ACU^{2}	Alternator control unit	Protection from alternator over-voltage.
AD	Airworthiness Directive	
ADA	Advisory area	
ADAHRS	Air data attitude heading reference system	
ADC	Air data computer	
ADD	Acceptable deferred defect	
ADF	Automatic direction finder	Navigation equipment
ADI	Attitude Director Indicator	
ADIRS	Air Data Inertial Reference System	
ADIRU	Air Data Inertial Reference Unit	
ADIZ	Air defense identification zone	
ADJ	Adjustment	Mechanical term
ADM^{1}	Aeronautical decision-making	Piloting term of judgment
ADM^{2}	Air data module	
ADN	Aircraft Data Network	Ethernet derivative for Commercial Aircraft
ADS^{1}	Air data system	
ADS^{2}	Automatic dependent surveillance	
ADS-A	Automatic dependent surveillance – address	
ADS-B	Automatic dependent surveillance – broadcast	
ADS-C	Automatic dependent surveillance – contract	
ADV	Arbeitsgemeinschaft Deutscher Verkehrsflughäfen	"German Airports Association"
AEA	Association of European Airlines	
AESA	Active electronically scanned array	
AFCS	automatic flight control system	
AFD	Autopilot flight director	
AFDC	Autopilot flight director computer	
AFDS	Autopilot flight director system	
AFDX	Avionics Full-Duplex Switched Ethernet	
AFE	Above field elevation	
AFIS	Airborne flight information system	Also called automatic flight information service
AFM	Aircraft flight manual	
AFS	Aeronautical fixed service	
AFT	Aft The direction against the aircraft movement	
AFTN	Aeronautical Fixed Telecommunication Network	
AGACS	Automatic ground–air communications system	Also known as ATCSS or data link
AGB	Accessory gear box	Mainly used in turbine engine
AGC	Automatic gain control	
AGDL	Air–ground data link	
AGL	Above ground level	
AHC	Attitude heading control	
AHRS	Attitude and heading reference system	
AIDS	Aircraft integrated data system	
AIM	Aeronautical Information Manual	
AIP	Aeronautical Information Publication	
AIRAC	Aeronautical information regulation and control	
AIRMET	Air-mission's Meteorological Advisory	In-flight advisory given over 126.7
AIS	Aeronautical Information Services	A place mostly for presenting Flight Plans and filing reports
AIXM	Aeronautical information exchange model	
ALC	Automatic level control	
ALI	Airworthiness Limitation Item	
ALNA	Airline network architecture	
ALS	Approach lighting system	
ALT^{1}	Alternate	
ALT^{2}	Altimeter	
ALT^{3}	Altitude	
ALT hold	Altitude hold mode	
ALTS	Altitude select	
ALUM	Aluminum	
AMC	Acceptable Means of Compliance (EASA)	
AME	Aircraft Maintenance Engineer	
AME	Aviation Medical Examiner	
AMLCD	Active-matrix liquid-crystal display	
AMM	Aircraft Maintenance Manual	
AMO	Approved Maintenance Organization	
AMS	Air management system	
AMSL	Above mean sea level	
AMP	Aircraft maintenance program	
AMT	Aircraft Maintenance Technician	
ANC	Active noise cancellation	
AND	Aircraft Nose Down	
ANN	Annunciator panel	Caution warning system normally containing visual and audio alerts to the pilot
ANPT	Aeronautical national pipe taper	
ANR	Active noise reduction	
ANSP^{1}	Air navigation service provider	
ANSP^{2}	Authorization of Aircraft Network Security Program (FAA)	
ANT	Antenna (radio)	
ANSOG	Airport Network Security Operator Guidance (Boeing)	
A/O	Air oil	In turbine engines
AOA	Angle of attack	
AOC^{1}	Air operator's certificate	
AOC^{2}	Aeronautical operational control	
AOG	Aircraft on ground	
AOM^{1}	Aircraft operations manual	
AOM^{2}	Airport/aerodrome operating minima	
AOP	Airport operating plan	
AP	Autopilot	
A/P	Airplane (US), Aeroplane (ICAO)	
APARS	Automatic pressure altitude reporting system	
APC	Auto pilot computer	
APIRS	Attitude and positioning inertial reference system	
APOA	Airport of arrival	
APOD	Airport of departure	
APM	Aircraft personality module	
APP	Appendix	
APP	Approach Control	ATC
APPL	Application	
APPROX	Approximately	
APS	Auto pilot system	
APT	Airport	
APU	Auxiliary power unit	
APV	Approach procedure with vertical guidance	Instrumental approach
AQP	Advanced Qualification Program	FAA training and testing
AR	Airworthiness review	
AR	Authorization required	
AR	As required	
ARC	Airworthiness review certificate	
ARINC	Aeronautical Radio Inc.	
ARO	Airport reservation office	
ARP	Aerodrome reference point	
ARTCC	Air route traffic control centers	
ASAS	Airborne Separation Assurance System	
ASD	Aircraft situation display	
ASDA	Accelerate Stop Distance Available	
ASDE-X	Airport Surface Detection Equipment, Model X	
ASDL	Aeronautical satellite data link	
ASI	Airspeed indicator	
ASL	Above sea level	
ASLO	Aircraft Security Logging Overview	
ASM	Airspace management	
ASM	Available seat miles	
A-SMGCS	Advanced Surface Movement Guidance and Control System	
ASOS	Automated Surface Observation System	
assy	Assembly	
A/S	Anti-Skid	
ASR	Airport surveillance radar	
ASU	Avionics switching unit	
A/T	Autothrottle	Also 'AT'
A/THR	Autothrust	
ATA	Air Transport Association	
ATAG	Air Transport Action Group	A coalition of aviation industry experts focusing on sustainable development issues.
ATC	Air traffic control	
ATCC	Air traffic control centre	
ATCO	Air traffic controller	
ATCT	Airport traffic control tower	
ATCRBS	Air traffic control radar beacon system	
ATCSS	Air traffic control signalling system	
ATD	Actual time of departure	Equivalent to off-block time
ATE	Advanced Technology Engine	
ATF	Aerodrome traffic frequency	
ATFM	Air traffic flow management	
ATIS	Automatic Terminal Information Service	
ATM	Air traffic management	
ATN	Aeronautical Telecommunication Network	
ATO	Approved Training Organisation	
ATPL	Airline Transport Pilot Licence	
ATQP	Alternative Training and Qualification Programme	
ATR^{1} ^{1}	Air transportable racking	
ATR^{2}	Automatic thrust restoration	
ATS	Air traffic service	
ATSAW	Airborne traffic situational awareness	
ATSU	Air traffic services unit	Avionics LRU for ACARS
ATT	Attitude	
ATTCS	Automatic Take-off Thrust Control System	
AUPRTA	Airplane Upset Prevention & Recovery Training Aid	
AVAIL	Available	
Avionics	Aviation electronics	
AVSA	"Adjust vertical speed adjust"	TCAS Voice command to adjust traffic separation
AWACS	Airborne Warning and Control System	Airborne early warning and control (AEW&C) or Boeing E-3 Sentry
AWBS	Aviation weather briefing service	Available at designated FSS's
AWG	American Wire Gage	The larger the size number, the smaller the wire diameter.
AWIS	Aviation weather information service	Available at FSS
AWO	All weather operations	
AWOS	Automated weather observation system	Automated METAR reporting system
AWWS	Aviation weather web site	In Canada

== B ==
Abbreviation	Term	Notes
B RNAV	Basic area navigation	
BARO	Barometric indication, setting or pressure	
baro-VNAV	Barometric vertical navigation	
BC	Back course	Or 'BCRS'
BCAA	Belgian Civil Aviation Authority	
BDC	bottom dead centre	Piston engine
BDI	Bearing distance indicator	
BFL	Balanced field length	
BFR	Biennial flight review	
BGAN	Broadcast Global Area Network	
BER	Beyond economic repair	Hull loss
BHP	Brake horsepower	
BITE	Built-In Test Equipment	
BL	Butt Line	
BME	Bridge Mounted Equipment	
B/P	Blue Print	
BPR	bypass ratio	
BOM	bill of material	
BTV	Brake-to-Vacate System	A new feature introduced by Airbus A380
BWC	bird watch condition	
BVID	Barely Visible Impact Damage	
BVR	Beyond Visual Range	

== C ==
Abbreviation	Term	Notes
C2	command and control	
CA	Captain	
CAA	Civil Aviation Authority	
CACTCS	Cabin Air Conditioning and Temperature Control System	(Pronounced "Cactus")
CAI	Caution Advisory Panel	Sometimes spelled "caution-advisory" or "caution/advisory". Also known as annunciator panel or Centralized Warning Panel (CWP)
CAM	cockpit area microphone	Part of a cockpit voice recorder
CAME	Continuing Airworthiness Management Exposition	
CAMO	Continuing Airworthiness Management Organisation	
CAMP	Continuous Airworthiness Maintenance Program (FAA)	
CAN bus	Controller Area Network	
CANSO	Civil Air Navigation Services Organisation	
CAP	cabin attendant panel	
CAR	civil aviation regulation	
CARs	civil aviation regulations	
CARS	Canadian Aviation Regulations	
CAS	calibrated airspeed	
CASS	Commercial Air Service Standards	
CASS	continuing analysis and surveillance system	
CAT (I–IIIc)	Operational performance Category	CAT I: Operational performance Category 1 CAT I Enhanced: Allows for lower minimums than CAT I in some cases to CAT 2 minimums CAT II: Operational performance Category II; CAT IIIa: Operational performance Category IIIa; CAT IIIb: Operational performance Category IIIb; CAT IIIc: Operational performance Category IIIc
CAT^{1}	clear air turbulence	
CAT^{2}	Commercial Air Transport	
CAVOK	Ceiling and Visibility OK	Visibility is at least 10 kilometres and no clouds below 5000 feet with no forecasted significant weather change such as precipitation.
CAVU	Ceiling and Visibility Unlimited	
CAW	continuing airworthiness (EASA)	
CB	Cumulonimbus cloud	
CBT	computer-based training	
CCRs	closed circuit mixed gas rebreathers	
CCRs	constant current regulators	
CDA	Continuous descent approach	
CDCCL	critical design configuration control limitation	
CDI	course deviation indicator	
CDU	Control Display Unit	
CDFA	Continuous Descent Final Approach	
NUO		
CDTI	Cockpit display of traffic information	
CDL	configuration deviation list	
CDU	control/display unit	
CFIT	controlled flight into terrain	
CFG	constant frequency generator	
CFR	Code of Federal Regulations	In the United States
CG	center of gravity	
CH	Course Heading	
CHDO	certificate-holding district office (FAA)	
CHP	Course Heading Panel	
CHT	Cylinder Head Temperature (Piston engine aviation)	
CI	cost index	
CID	Customer induced damage	
C/L	Centre line	
CL	checklist	A flight deck manual, usually part of a Quick Reference Handbook
CLR	Clear	Seen on GFA and is used for sky coverage
CMC	central maintenance computer	
CMM	component maintenance manual	
CMO	Certificate Management Office	FAA
CMV	converted meteorological visibility	
CMPA	complex motor-powered aircraft	
CMU	Communications Management Unit	
CNS	Communication, navigation and surveillance	
CNS/ATM	Communication, navigation and surveillance / Air traffic management	
CODEC	Coder/decoder	
CofA	Certificate of airworthiness	
COMM or COM	Communications transceiver, Communications receiver, or Communications radio transmitter	Now, normally: either VHF or UHF; HF communications avionics are usually abbreviated simply HF
CORSIA	Carbon Offsetting and Reduction Scheme for International Aviation	
COTS	Commercial off-the-shelf	
CPA	Closest point of approach	
CPDLC	controller–pilot data link communications	
CPR	Changed product rule	EASA
CPS	Cycles per second	
CRD	Comment-response document (EASA)	Part of rule making process
CRES	Corrosion resistant steel	
CRM	Crew resource management	
CRT	Cathode-ray tube	
CS	certification specification (EASA)	
CSD	constant speed drive	
CSDB	Commercial Standard Digital Bus	
CSDB	Collins Standard Digital Bus	
CSN	Cycles since new	Normally measured in FC or EFC for an aircraft, engine or component
CSO	cycles since overhaul	
CSS	cabin services system	
CSU	constant speed unit	
CSCT	Configuration Item Signer Crater Tool	Boeing
CTAF	common traffic advisory frequency	
CTR	controlled traffic region/control zone	
CV/DFDR	Cockpit voice and digital flight data recorder	See Flight recorder
CVR	cockpit voice recorder	See Flight recorder
CWS	control wheel steering	

== D ==
Abbreviation	Term	Notes
D	Compass Deviation	
DA/H	decision altitude/height (rel. to THR)	See instrument landing system
DA^{1}	Decision Altitude	Precision approach or vertical guidance
DA^{2}	density altitude	
DA^{3}	Drift angle	
DAH	design approval holder (EASA)	
DAPs	Downlink of aircraft parameters	
DBER	damaged beyond economic repair	Hull loss
DCDU	Datalink control and display unit	
DCL	Departure Clearance via CPDLC	
DCP	Display control panel	
DDG	Dispatch deviation guide	https://fsims.faa.gov/WDocs/8400.10%20Air%20Transp%20Ops%20Insp%20Handbk/Volume%204.%20AIRCRAFT%20EQUIPMENT%20AND%20OPERATIONAL%20AUTHORIZATIONS/Vol%204-Chap%204-Sec%203.htm
DEFDARS	Digital Expandable Flight Data Acquisition and Recording System	
DER	departure end of runway	
DER	Designated Engineering Representative	
DEU	display electronic unit	
DFDR	Digital Flight Data Recorder	See flight recorder
DFMC	Dual Frequency Multiple Constellation	
DG	directional gyro	
DGPS	differential GPS	
DGR	Dangerous Goods Regulation	
DH	Decision height	Precision approach, referred to threshold elevation
DIA	diameter	
DLR	datalink recorder	
DLR	German Aerospace Center / Deutsches Zentrum für Luft- und Raumfahrt e.V.	
DME	distance measuring equipment	
DME	Designated Mechanic Examiner	A person appointed by the FAA
DMI	deferred maintenance item	
DNC	Direct noise canceling	
DO	design organization	
DOA	design organization approval	EASA
DODAR	diagnose, options, decide, act/assign, review	
DOM	design organization manual	
DOW	dry operational weight	
DP	Departure Procedures	
DPU	Display Processor Unit	
DR	dead reckoning	
DRMC	Direct Reading Magnetic Compass	
DSP	Digital signal processing	
DTO	declared training organisation	
DTU	Data transfer unit	
DUATS	Direct User Access Terminal Service	
DVE	Degraded Visual Environment	

== E ==
Abbreviation	Term
EA	engineering authorisation
EADI	Electronic Attitude Direction Indicator
EAS	equivalent airspeed
EASA	European Aviation Safety Agency
EAT	expected approach time
EBOM	engineering Bill of Material
EBU	engine build-up
EC	engineering control (also E/C)
ECAM	electronic centralised aircraft monitor
ECET	end of civil evening twilight
ECR	Engineering Change Request
ECS	Environmental control system
ECU	Engine Control Unit (=EEC)
EDR	engineering data record
EDTO	extended diversion time operations
EEC	electronic engine control
EET	estimated elapsed time
EFB	electronic flight bag
EFC^{1}	Engine Flight Cycle
EFC^{2}	expect further clearance
EFD	Electronic flight display
EFFRA	engine failure flap retraction altitude
EFIS	electronic flight instrument system
EFH	Engine Flight Hour
EFP	engine failure procedure
EFS	elevator feel shift
EFTO	engine failure on take-off
EFVS	Enhanced flight visual system
EGPWS	enhanced ground proximity warning system
EGI	Embedded GPS Inertial
EGNOS	European Geostationary Navigation Overlay Service
EGT	exhaust gas temperature
EHM	engine health monitoring
EHS	Enhanced surveillance
EHSI	Electronic Horizontal Situation Indicator
EICAS	engine-indicating and crew-alerting system
EIS	Electronic Instrument System
E-LSA	experimental light-sport aircraft
ELAC	elevator and aileron computer
ELOS	Equivalent Level of Safety
ELT	emergency locator transmitter
EMAS	engineered materials arresting system
EMDP	electric motor driven pump
ENC	Electronic noise canceling
ENCASIA	European Network of Civil Aviation Safety Investigation Authorities
ENG	engine
ENR	Electronic noise reduction
EOBT	estimated off-blocktime
EPA	European part approval (EASA)
EPR	engine pressure ratio
EPU	Emergency Power Unit
ERAM	En Route Automation Modernization
ERM	engineering request for maintenance
ESA	emergency safe altitude
ETA	estimated time of arrival
ETD	estimated time of departure
ETE	estimated time en route
ETL	effective translational lift
ETOPS	Extended-range Twin-engine Operation Performance Standards
ETSO	European Technical Standard Order, issued by EASA; see TSO
EUROCAE	European Organisation for Civil Aviation Equipment
EVAS	Emergency Vision Assurance System
EVSI	Enhanced Vision Systems Instrument
EVS	Enhanced Vision Systems
EW	Empty Weight

== F ==
Abbreviation	Term	Notes
FA	Flight attendant	Flight crew
FAA	Federal Aviation Administration	U.S. Department of Transportation agency
FAC	Final approach course	
FACF	final approach course fix	Point at which the final approach descent is begun
FADEC	full authority digital engine control	Engine equipment
FAC	Flight Augmentation computer	Avionics
FAF	final approach fix	
FAF	first available flight	Airline operations
FALS	full approach lighting system	
FANS	Future Air Navigation System	Avionics
FAP	final approach point	
FAP	forward attendant panel	Aircraft equipment
FAR	Federal Aviation Regulation	FAA regulation
FAR/AIM	Federal Aviation Regulation / Aeronautical Information Manual	Bundle of FAA regulations and Aeronautical Manual
FAROS	final approach runway occupancy signal	
FAS	final approach segment	
FAT	Free air temperature	
FATO	final approach and take off	
FB	Winds aloft	World Meteorological Organization abbrev. see also FD
FBO	fixed-base operator	Airfield operations
FBS	fixed base simulator	Flight crew training
FBW	fly-by-wire	
FCC	Flight Control Computer	
FC	flight crew	
FCF	functional flight check	Check functionality after maintenance
FCMC	Fuel Control & Monitoring Computer	
FCOM	flight crew operating manual	Aircraft operations
FCS	flight control system	
FCTM	flight crew training manual	
FCU	fuel control unit	In turbine engines
FD	flight director	Avionics
FD	upper winds and temperature forecast	US and Canada abbrev. See also FB
FDAU	flight-data acquisition unit	
FDM	flight data monitoring	Operations planning
FDP	flight duty period	
FDPS	flight plan data processing system	Flight planning
FDR	flight data recorder	Avionics. Also known as 'black box'.
FDRS	flight data recorder system	Avionics
FDTL	flight duty time limitations	
FDU	flux detector unit	
FEP	final end point	
FF	fuel flow	
FFDZ	free fall drop zone (parachutists)	
FFS	full flight simulator	Flight crew training
FG	Flight Guidance	
FIC	flight information centre	
FIDO	Fog Investigation and Dispersal Operation	Airfield operations
FIKI	Flight Into Known Icing	Aircraft operations
FIR	flight information region	ATC
FIS	Federal Inspection Services	
FIS-B	Flight information services – broadcast	
FISE	flight information service enroute	
FL	flight level	ATC
FLIR	Forward-looking infra-red	
FLTA	Forward-looking terrain avoidance	
FM	frequency modulation	Example: FM immunity
FMA	flight mode annunciator	Equipment
FMC	flight management computer (part of a FMS)	Avionics
FMGC	Flight management and guidance computer	Avionics. Also FMGS: Flight Management & Guidance System
FMS	flight management system	Avionics
FO	first officer	Flight crew
FOB	Fuel On-Board	
FOD	foreign object damage	Airfield operations
FOO	flight operations officer	Airline employee
FOQA	flight operational quality assurance	
FPA	flight path angle	
FPL	filed flight plan	ATC
FPM	feet per minute	
FQIS	Fuel Quantity Indication System	
FREQ	Frequency	
FS	Fuselage station	
FSDO	Flight Standards District Office (FAA)	
FSF	Flight Safety Foundation	U.S.-based nonprofit organisation
FSIMS	Flight Standards Information Management System (FAA)	
FSS	flight service station	
FTD	flight training device	Flight crew training
FTL	flight time limitations	
FVU	flux valve unit	Equipment; a type of fluxgate compass
FWS	Flight warning system	
FYDS	Flight director / yaw damper system	

== G ==
Abbreviation	Term	Notes
GA	general aviation	
G/A or GA	go-around	Aborted landing procedure
GAST	GBAS Approach Service Type	
GBAS	Ground based augmentation system	
GBST	ground-based, software tool	Airfield operations
GCA	Ground-controlled approach	Airfield operations
GCAS	Ground collision avoidance system	
GCU	generator control unit	
GDOP	Geometric dilution of precision	
GEA	Ground effect area	
GGS	Global positioning system ground station	
GHz	Gigahertz	
GLOC	g-induced loss of consciousness	"g" Is acceleration relevant to the acceleration caused by gravity
GLONASS	Global Navigation Satellite System	Russian GNSS
GLNS	GPS Landing and Navigation System	
GLNU	GPS Landing and Navigation Unit	
GLS	GBAS Landing System	
GLU	GPS landing unit	
GM	guidance material (EASA)	
GMM	general maintenance manual	
GMT	Greenwich Mean Time	
GNADIRU	Global Navigation Air Data Inertial Reference Unit	Northrop Grumman term
GNADIRS	Global Navigation Air Data Inertial Reference System	Northrop Grumman term
GND	ground	Airfield operations
GNSS	Global Navigation Satellite System	
GP	glide path	See instrument landing system
GPP	general practices and procedures	
GPS	Global Positioning System	Avionics
GPU	Ground Power Unit	Aerospace Ground Equipment
GPWS	ground proximity warning system	Avionics
G/S	glideslope	Avionics
GS	groundspeed	
GSE	ground support equipment	Aerospace ground equipment
GSPT	Gross shop processing time	
GSPU	Glider snatch pick-up	
GUMPS	Gas, Undercarriage, Mixture, Propeller, Seat belts/Switches	Mental checklist before landing

== H ==
Abbreviation	Term	Notes
H	Heavy	Wake turbulence category
H	High	
HAA	Height above airport	
HAT	Height Above Touchdown	
HAZMAT	Hazardous Material	
HBCS	High Bandwidth Connectivity System	
HDB	Horizontal Deviation Bar (GS)	
HDG	Heading	Navigation
HDG SEL	Heading select	Navigation
HDI	Horizontal Deviation Indicator	
HDOP	Horizontal dilution of precision	
HF	High frequency	
HFE	Human Factors Engineering	
HFES	Human Factors and Ergonomics Society	U.S.-based nonprofit organisation
"Hg	Inch of Mercury	Symbol for unit of pressure
HHLD	Heading hold	Navigation
HIGE	hover in ground effect	Helicopter operations
HIRL	High Intensity Runway lighting	Airfield operations
HIRO	High Intensity Runway Operation	Airfield operations
HIRTA	High Intensity Radio Transmission Area	
HIWAS	Hazardous Inflight Weather Advisory Service	
HL	Height loss	
HLD	hold	Maintain same altitude or speed or direction
HMG	hydraulic motor generator	
HMD	Helmet-mounted display	
HMU	hydro-mechanical unit	In turbine engine
HOGE	hover out of ground effect	Helicopter operations
HOTAS	Hands On Throttle And Stick	
HPA	human-powered aircraft	Aircraft type
HPC	high pressure compressor	In turbine engine
HPR	High Pressure Rotor	
HPT	high pressure turbine	In turbine engines
HPTACC	high pressure turbine active clearance control	Mainly used in turbofan engines
HSD	High-speed data	
HSI	horizontal situation indicator	Avionics
HSL	Heading select	
HUD	head-up display	Avionics
HUM	Human Remains	
HUMS	Health and usage monitoring systems	
HW	headwind	
HYD	hydraulic	Aircraft equipment
HYDIM	hydraulic interface module	
Hz	Hertz	Symbol for unit of frequency

== I ==
Abbreviation	Term	Notes
IAC	instrument approach chart	
IAF	initial approach fix	
IAN	Integrated Approach Navigation	IAN approaches provide the functions, indications and alerting features similar to an ILS approach (B737 FCTM)
IAP	instrument approach procedure	
IAS	indicated airspeed	
IATA	International Air Transport Association	
IB	inboard	
ICA	Instructions for Continuous Airworthiness	
ICAO	International Civil Aviation Organization	
ICAS	International Council of the Aeronautical Sciences	
ICD	interface control document	
ICO	idle cut-off	
ICTS	ice-contaminated tailplane stall	
ID	identify/identification or identifier	
IDENT	identify/identifier	
IDG	integrated drive generator	Combination of a CSD and generator in a single case
IDS	information display system	Or: integrated display system
IDT	identify	XPDR
IEPR	integrated engine pressure ratio	
IETM	interactive electronic technical manual	
IF	intermediate approach fix	Instrumental approach
IFA	International Federation of Airworthiness	
IFATCA	International Federation of Air Traffic Controllers' Associations	
IFE	in-flight entertainment	
IFF	identification friend or foe	
IFICS	integrated flight instrument and control system	British Aircraft Corporation, now British Aerospace
IFLD	In-flight Landing Distance	Airbus term
IFP	instrument flight procedure	
IFR	instrument flight rules	
IFSD	in-flight shutdown	
IGV	inlet guide vane	
ILS	instrument landing system	
IMC	instrument meteorological conditions	
IML	inside mold line	
IND	indicator	
InHg	inch of mercury	
INS	inertial navigation system	
IPC	illustrated parts catalog (e.g. by Boeing, Airbus)	
IR	initial release	
IRS	inertial reference system	
IRT	instrument rating test	
IRU	inertial reference unit	
IRVR	instrumented runway visual range	
ISA	International Standard Atmosphere	
ISFD	integrated standby flight display	
ISIS	integrated standby instrument system	
ISP	integrated switching panel	
ITAR	International Traffic in Arms Regulations	
ITT	interstage turbine temperature	
IVSI	instantaneous vertical speed indicator	

== J ==
Abbreviation	Term
JAA	Joint Aviation Authorities
JAR	Joint Aviation Requirements
JTIDS	Joint Tactical Information Distribution System

== K ==
Abbreviation	Term
KCAS	knots calibrated airspeed
KIAS	knots indicated airspeed
KRE	key risk element
KTAS	knots true airspeed

== L ==
Abbreviation	Term	Notes
L	Light	Wake turbulence category
LAAS	Local Area Augmentation System	
LADGPS	Local Area Differential GPS	
LAHSO	Land And Hold Short Operations	
LAME	licensed aircraft maintenance engineer	
LAT	large air tanker	A class of waterbomber
LCC	low-cost carrier	
LCD	liquid crystal display	
LCG	load classification group	
LCN	load classification number	
LDA	landing distance available	
LDA	localizer type directional aid	
LDGPS	local area differential global positioning satellite	
LDR	landing distance required	
LED	light-emitting diode	
LHO	live human organs	
LHS	left hand seat	Jargon for captain
LIFR	Low Instrument Flight Rules	ceiling < 500 ft and/or visibility < 1 sm
LIR	Loading Instruction Report	
LKP	last known position	
LLC	Life Limited Component	
LLP	Life Limited Part	EASA, ICAO
LLZ	localizer	ILS approach
LM	land and marine	
LMM	Locator middle marker	
LNAV	lateral navigation	
LOA	letter of authorization	FAA
LOC	localizer	
LOC	loss of control	
LOCI	loss of control inflight	
LOFT	line-oriented flight training	
LOM	limitation of movement	
LOM	locator outer marker	
LOPA	Location of Passenger Accommodations	
LORAN	Long-range navigation	
LOTC	loss of thrust control	
LPC	low pressure compressor	In turbine engines
LPR	Low Pressure Rotor	
LPT	low pressure turbine	
LPTACC	low pressure turbine active clearance control	Mainly used in turbofan engines
LPV	localizer performance with vertical guidance	
LRC	long range cruise	
LRD	load reduction device	
LRU	line-replaceable unit	
LSAP	loadable software aircraft part (EASA)	Introduced in RMP for technical records
LSAS	longitudinal stability augmentation system	
LTC	line training captain	
LTE	Loss of Tail Rotor Effectiveness	Helicopters
LTP	landing threshold point	
LVP	low visibility procedures	Designated state of operations at aerodromes where instrument approaches and low-visibility takeoff procedures are used during inclement weather
LW	landing weight	
LX	Lightning	
LZ	landing zone	

== M ==
Abbreviation	Term	Notes
M	medium	Wake turbulence category
MAC	mean aerodynamic chord	
MAC	mid-air collision	
MAHF	Missed Approach Holding Fix	Used in RNAV
MANAB	Manual of Word Abbreviations	Used in Canada
MAP	manifold absolute pressure	
MAP	missed approach point	Or: MAPt. Instrument approach.
MAPS	Minimum Aviation Performance Standards	
MATS	Manual of Air Traffic Services	
MB	Marker beacon	
MBC	Main Base Check	
MCAS	Maneuvering Characteristics Augmentation System	Held responsible for Boeing 737 MAX groundings
MCBF	Mean cycles between failures	
MCC	Multi-crew cooperation	
MCDU	multifunction control display unit	
MCH	Manufacturer Certificate Holder	TCCA; see also PAH and POA
MCP	mode control panel	
MCT	maximum continuous thrust	
MCDU	multi control display unit	
MDA	minimum descent altitude	Or: minimum decision altitude. Non-precision approach.
MDDR	maintenance deferred defect record	
MDH	minimum descent height	Or: minimum decision height. Non-precision approach.
MDM	multi-disciplinary measure	EASA
ME	Manufacturing Engineer	
MEA	Minimum En-route Altitude	
MEDEVAC	medical evacuation	
MEF	maximum elevation figure	
MMEL	master minimum equipment list	
MEL	minimum equipment list	
MEP	multi-engine piston	
METAR	meteorological aerodrome report	
MF	Medium frequency	
MFD	multi-function display	
MFDS	multi-function display system	
MFRA	minimum flap retraction altitude	
MH	magnetic heading	
MIC	Microphone	
MIDS	Multifunctional information distribution system	
MIJI	Meaconing, intrusion, jamming, and interference	
MILSPEC	Military specification	
MKP	Multi-function Keypad	
MKR	Marker beacon	
ML	maintenance laptop	
MLDW	maximum landing weight	
MLG	Main Landing Gear	
MLS	microwave landing system	
MM	middle marker	
MMD	Moving map display	
MNPS	Minimum navigation performance specifications	
MOA	Military operations area	
MOCA	Minimum Obstacle Clearance Altitude	
Mode A	Transponder pulse-code reporting	
Mode B	Transponder code and altitude reporting	
Mode C	Transponder code, altitude, and TCAS reporting	
MOE	maintenance organisation exposition	
MOPS	Minimum Operational Performance Standard	
MORA	Minimum Off Route Altitude	
MOSArt	Modular Open System Architecture	
MP	manifold pressure	
MPL	multi-crew pilot license	
MPU	Multifunction Processor Unit	
MRB	Material Review Board	
MRO	maintenance, repair, overhaul	
MRO	maintenance and repair organization	
MROT	Minimum Runway Occupancy Time	
MRP	Material Resources Planning	
MRW	maximum ramp weight	
MSA	minimum safe altitude / minimum sector altitude	
MSD	Minimum Stabilization Distance	
MSDS	Material Safety Data Sheet	
MSG	Message	
MSL	mean sea level	
MSLW	Max. Structural Landing Weight	
MSP	Modes S-Specific Protocol	
MSSS	Mode S-Specific Services	
MSTOW	Max. Structural Take-off Weight	
MSZFW	Max. Structural Zero Fuel Weight	
MTBF	Mean time between failures	
MTBSV	Mean time between shop visit	
MTBUR	Mean time between unscheduled removals	
MTOW	maximum take-off weight	
MTTF	Mean time to failure	
MVA	Minimum Vectoring Altitude	
MVFR	Marginal visual flight rules	ceiling 1000-3000′ and/or visibility 3-5 miles
MX	Maintenance	
MZFW	Maximum Zero Fuel Weight	

== N ==
Abbreviation	Term	Notes
NADP	noise abatement departure procedure	
NAS	National Airspace System	United States
NAV	Navigation receiver	Normally VHF navigation receiver for VOR
Navaid	Navigational aid	Or: aid to navigation (ATON)
NAVCOMM	Combination navigation and communications equipment	Or: NAV/COM or NAV-COM. normally VHF navigation receiver integrated with VHF communications transceiver
NAVSTAR-GPS	Navigation Satellite Timing And Ranging	The space-borne or satellite navigation system
NCAT	National Center for Aviation Training	US educational facility
NCATT	National Center for Aircraft Technician Training	US educational facility
ND	Navigation display	
NDB	non-directional beacon	
NDT	non-destructive testing	
NFF	No fault found	Or: no trouble found (NTF) or no defect found (NDF)
NGS	nitrogen generation system	
NHA	next higher assembly	
NIST	National Institute of Standards and Technology	
NLG	nose landing gear	
NLR	Netherlands Aerospace Research Centre	
NM	Nautical mile	Or: NMI
NNC	non-normal checklist	
NNM	non-normal maneuver (Boeing QRH - 737 Flight Crew Operations Manual)	
NORAD	North American Aerospace Defense Command	US-Canadian military security agency
NORDO	no radio	
NOTAM	Notice to air missions / Notice to Airmen	
NOTAR	no tail rotor	Helicopter control system
NOZ	Normal Operating Zone	Parallel runways operation
NPA	non-precision approach	Instrumental approach
NPA	notice of proposed amendment	EASA
NPRM	notice of proposed rulemaking	FAA
NRR	noise reduction rating	hearing protector attenuation
NRTC	nonroutine task card	
NVD	Night-vision device	Or: Night-vision goggles (NVG)
NTSB	National Transportation Safety Board	U.S. governmental agency
NTZ	no-transgression zone	Parallel runways operation

== N numbers (turbines) ==
Abbreviation	Term	Notes
N_{#}	compressor speed	N_{1}, N_{2}, etc. refers to the specific compressor spool (in the order that air passes over them). (See: Jet engine)
N_{g}	gas generator speed	
N_{h}	high rotor speed	
N_{p}	power turbine speed	
N_{r}	rotor speed (helicopters)	Np and Nr are typically shown on the same gauge with two needles, both expressed in percent, so that the pilot can tell if the power turbine is driving the rotor or if it is freewheeling.

== O ==
Abbreviation	Term	Notes
OAS	Obstacle Assessment Surface	
OAT	outside air temperature	
OBE	overcome by events	
OBI	Omnibearing indicator	See CDI
OBS	omni-bearing selector	
OCA	obstacle clearance altitude	
OCC	Operations control center	
OCCM	on condition / condition monitored components	
OCH	obstacle clearance height	
OEI	one engine inoperative	
OEM	original equipment manufacturer	
OFZ	Obstacle Free Zone	
OGV	outlet guide vane	
OHM	overhaul manual	
OIS	obstacle identification surface	Instrumental procedures
OIS	Operational Information System	
OLD	Operational Landing Distance	Boeing term
OM	outer marker	
OML	outer mold line	
ONS	onboard network system	
ONAT	Onboard Network Access Terminal	
O/R	On Request	
OTS	out of service	
OPC	operational check	
OPS/CHK	operational check	
OW	operational weight	
OWE/OEW	Operating Weight Empty/Operating empty weight	

== P ==
Abbreviation	Term	Notes
P	(as a prefix:) prohibited airspace	
PA	pressure altitude	
PA	Public address system	
PAEW	Personnel and equipment working	
PAH	production approval holder	FAA; see also POA and MCH
PAL	Pilot Activated Lighting	
PANS-OPS	procedures for air navigation services – aircraft operations	
PAOG	Pre Aircraft on Ground	
PAPI	precision approach path indicator	
PAR	precision approach radar	
PATWAS	Pilot's Automatic Telephone Weather Answering Service	
PAX	passenger	
PBCS	performance-based communication and surveillance	
PBD	place bearing distance	RNAV waypoint
PBE	Protective Breathing Equipment	
PBN	Performance-Based Navigation	
PC	proficiency check	
PCL	Pilot Controlled Lighting	
P-Code	GPS precision code	
PCN	pavement classification number	
PD	Profile descent	
PDA	performance degradation allowance	
PDAS	public domain aeronautical software	
PDC	Pre-Departure Clearance	
PDG	procedure design gradient	
PDM	pilot decision making	
PDOP	Position dilution of precision	
PDU	power drive unit	Flap actuation
PET	point of equal time	
PESA	Passive electronically scanned array	
PF	pilot flying	
PFAF	precision final approach fix	
PFD	primary flight display	Or: primary flight director
PIC	Pilot In Command	
PICUS	Pilot In Command, under supervision	
PIO	Pilot Induced Oscillations	
PIP	performance improvement package	
PIREP	Pilot Report	
PJA	Parachute Jumping Area	
PJE	Parachute jumping exercise	
PM	pilot monitoring	
PMA	Parts Manufacturer Approval	
PMI	Principal Maintenance Inspector	
PMC	power management computer	Turbine engines
PMG	permanent magnet generator	
PN	part number	Also P/N
PND	primary navigation display	
PNF	pilot not flying	
PNR	passive noise reduction	
PNR	Point of No Return	
POA	Production Organisation Approval	EASA; see also PAH and MHC
POB	persons on board	
POF	Phase of flight	
POF	Principles Of Flight	
PO	Pilot's Operating Handbook	Sometimes referred to as a POH
POS	Position	
PPL	private pilot licence	
PPR	prior permission required	
PRA	Pre-recorded announcement	
P-RNAV		
PS	passenger step	
PSAA	Product support and assurance agreement	
PSEU	Proximity Switch Electronic Unit / B737	
PSR	point of safe return	
PSR	power supply reset	
PSR	primary surveillance radar	
PSU	passenger service unit	
PTCU	power transfer Control unit	
PTF	permit to fly	
PTOL	point take-off and landing	
PTR	Pilot Training Record	
PTT	push to talk	
PYLD	payload	

== Q ==
Abbreviation	Term	Notes
QAR	quick access recorder	
QCM	quality and compliance monitoring	
QEC	quick engine change	
QFE	the Q-code for: Atmospheric pressure at aerodrome elevation (or at runway threshold)	
QNE	the Q-code for pressure altitude	
QNH	the Q-code for: Altimeter sub-scale setting to obtain elevation when on the ground, i.e. altitude above MSL	
QRA	quick reaction alert	
QRH	quick reference handbook	
QTOL	quiet take-off and landing	

== R ==
Abbreviation	Term	Notes
R	(as a prefix:) restricted airspace	
RA	radio altitude or radar altimeter	
RA	resolution advisory	In the context of TCAS
RAAS	Runway Awareness and Advisory System	
RAAS	remote airport advisory service	
Rad Alt	Radio Altitude	
Radar	RAdio Detection And Ranging	
RAI	Radio altimeter indicator	
RAIM	Receiver Autonomous Integrity Monitoring	Or: remote autonomous integrity monitoring
RALT	Radar or radio altimeter	
RAREPS	Weather Radar Reports	Provided by Air Traffic Controllers
RAS	rectified air speed	
RA(T)	restricted area (temporary)	
RAT	ram air turbine	
RCO	remote communications outlet	
RCR	Reverse current relay	
RCVR	Radio receiver	
RDH	reference datum height	For instrument landing system (ILS)
RDMI	Radio distance magnetic indicator	
RDP	Radar data processing system	
RDR	Radar	
REF	Reference	
REIL	Runway end identifier lights	
REL	Relative	
REO	Repair engineering order	
RESA	runway end safety area	
RF	Radio frequency	
RFF	rescue and fire fighting	
RFI	Radio frequency interference	
RFI	recreational flight instructor	
RGB	reduction gear box	
RHS	right hand seat	Jargon for first officer
RHSM	reduced horizontal separation minimal	
RIA	regulatory impact assessment (EASA)	
RII	required inspection items	
RLG	Ring laser gyroscope	
RLTC	Remaining Life Time Cycle	Counter to the limiter especially for LLPs in engines
RLY	Relay	
RMI	radio magnetic indicator	
RMP	Radio Management Panel	
RMT	rule making task (EASA)	
RNAV	area navigation	
RNG	Range (aeronautics)	
RNP	required navigation performance	
RoC	Rate of climb	
RoD	Rate of descent	Or: sink rate
RPA	Remotely Piloted Aircraft	Or: Unmanned aerial vehicle (UAV)
RPAS	Remotely Piloted Aircraft System	
RPL	Recreational Pilot Licence	
RPL	repetitive flight planning	
RPM	Revolutions per minute	
RPT	regular public transport	
RQR	Required	
RSA	runway safety area	
RSP	Reversion switch panel	
RSR	en-route surveillance radar	
RT	radiotelephony	
RTB	return to base	
RTE	Route	
RTF	radiotelephony	
RTL	rudder travel limiting	
RTO	Rejected takeoff	
RTOL	Reduced take-off and landing	
RTOW	regulatory take-off weight	
RVDT	rotary variable differential transformer	In a turbine engine
RVR	runway visual range	
RVSM	reduced vertical separation minima	
RW	ramp weight	
RWY	runway	
RX	Radio receiver	

== S ==
Abbreviation	Term	Notes
SAF	Sustainable aviation fuel	
SAIL	Specific assurance and integrity level	
SAR	Search and rescue	
SAR	Smart ACMS Recorder	
SAR	Surveillance Approach Radar	
SAS	stability augmentation system	
SAT	Static Air Temperature	Or: Outside air temperature (OAT)
SATCOM	Satellite communication	
SATNAV	Satellite navigation	
SB	service bulletin	
SBAAS	Satellite-Based Augmentation System	Or: SBAS
SC	special condition	
SCAP	Standard Computerized Airplane Performance	
SCCM	senior cabin crew member	
SD	Secure digital	
SDF	Simplified directional facility	
SDU	Satellite data unit	
SELCAL	Selective calling	
SEP	Safety and Emergency Procedures	
SEP	single-engine piston	
SESAR	Single European Sky ATM Research	
SESMA	Special Event Search and Master Analysis	
SF	Stratus Fractus	Cloud type
SFCC	Slat Flap Control Computer	
SFO	Senior First Officer	
SFP	Short Field Performance	B737 Enhancement program for landing in short runways
SFOC	Special Flight Operating Certificate	
SID	standard instrument departure	
SIGMET	Significant Meteorological Information	
SIU	Satellite interface unit	
SLOP	Strategic lateral offset procedure	
SLPC	single lever power control	
SM	service manual	
SMM	safety management document	ICAO
SMOH	Since major overhaul	
SMR	surface movement radar	
SMS	Short Messaging Service	
SMT	software maintenance tool	
SN	serial number	
SNR	signal-to-noise ratio	
SOC	start of climb at missed approach	
SODPRO	simultaneous opposite direction parallel runway operations	
SOF	special operations forces	Military unit
SOG	speed over ground	Same as ground speed
SOG	Special Operations Group	
SOP	standard operating procedure	
SOW	Statement of Work	
SPKR	Speaker	
SPS	Stall Protection System	
SQ	Squelch	Or: SQL
SR	sunrise	
SRM	structural repair manual	
SRS	Speed Reference System	
SS	sunset	
SSCV/DR	Solid-state cockpit voice/data recorder	See flight recorder
SSCVR	Solid-state cockpit voice recorder	See flight recorder
SSFDR	Solid-state flight data recorder	See flight recorder
SSR	Secondary surveillance radar	
STAR	standard terminal arrival route	
STARS	Standard Terminal Automation Replacement System	
STC	supplemental type certificate	
STCA	Short-Term Conflict Alert	
STOL	short take-off and landing	
STP	Standard temperature and pressure	
STS	speed trim system	
SUA	Special use airspace	
SVFR	Special visual flight rules	
SVGS	Synthetic vision guidance system	

== T ==
Abbreviation	Term	Notes
TA	traffic advisory	See TCAS
TAA	terminal arrival altitude	
TAA	terminal arrival area	
TAC	thrust asymmetry compensation	
TACAN	tactical air navigation (system)	
Tach	Tachometer	
TAD	Terrain awareness display	
TAF	terminal aerodrome forecast	Or: Terminal area forecast.
TAI	thermal anti-ice	
TALPA	Takeoff and Landing Performance Assessment Aviation Rules Committee	
TAM	total airport management	
TAR	terminal approach radar	
TAS	true airspeed	
TAT	total air temperature	Or: true air temperature
TAWS	terrain awareness and warning system	
TBO	time between overhauls	Or: time before overhaul
TBV	transient bleed valve	In turbine engines
TC	Transport Canada	
TC	towering cumulus	
TC	turn coordinator	
TC	True Course	
TC	type certificate	
TCA	terminal control area (USA/Canada)	Europe: terminal manoeuvring area (TMA)
TCA	Throttle control assembly	
TCAS	traffic collision avoidance system	
TCCA	Transport Canada's Civil Aviation	
TCDS	type certificate data sheet	
TCF	Terrain clearance floor	
TCH	threshold crossing height	
TCI	thrust computer indicator	
TCMA	thrust control malfunction accommodation	
TCN	TACAN	
TCU	Telecommunication control unit	Or: terminal control unit, or line control unit, used in Air traffic control
TDOP	Time dilution of precision	
TDR	Transponder	(In some cases)
TDZ	touchdown zone	
TERPS	terminal instrument procedures	Or: terminal en route procedures
TFC	traffic	
TFR	temporary flight restriction	Airspace
TFT	Thin-film transistor	
TGB	transfer gearbox	
TGL	temporary guidance leaflet	
TGL(S)	touch-and-go landing(s)	
TGT	Target	
TGT	Turbine gas temperature	
THLD	threshold	Or: THR
TH	True Heading	Or: THDG
THR	runway threshold	
THS	trimmable horizontal stabilizer, see tailplane	
TIS–B	Traffic information service – broadcast	
TIT	turbine inlet temperature	
TK	Track angle	
TKE	Track-angle error	
TLD	time-limited dispatch	
TLA	Three-letter acronym	
TLA	Thrust lever angle	
TLB	technical logbook (EASA)	
TLS	transponder landing system	
TMA	terminal manoeuvring area (Europe)	USA/Canada: terminal control area
TMG	touring motor glider	
TML	Toolbox Mobile Library (Boeing)	
TMZ	transponder mandatory zone	
TOC	Top of climb	Or: T/C
TOD	top of descent (point)	Or: T/D
TODA	take-off distance available	
TO/GA	Takeoff/go-around switch / thrust	Or: TOGA
TOP	take-off power	
TOR	take-off runway	
TORA	take-off runway available	
TOT	Turbine outlet temperature	
TOW	take-off weight	
TOWS	take-off warning system	
TP	turning point at missed approach	
TPA	traffic pattern altitude	
TR	tail rotor	Or: T/R. Helicopters.
TR	thrust reverser(s)	Or: T/R
TR	transformer rectifier	
TR	transmitter receiver or transceiver	Or: T/R
TRA	temporary reserved area (airspace)	
TRACON	terminal radar approach control	
TRANS	transition	
TRANS	Transmission (telecommunications)	Or: transmit
TRE	type rating examiner	
TRK	Track	
TRP	thrust rating panel	
TRP	Mode S transponder	
TSO	technical standard order	FAA specification of quality standard.
TSLOVH	Time since last overhaul	Normally measured in FH or EFH
TSN	Time since new	Normally measured in FH or EFH for an aircraft, engine or component
TTAF	total time air frame	
TTL	Tuned to Localizer	
TTR	TCAS II transmitter/receiver	
TTS	Time to station	
TTSN	total time since new	
TTSO	total time since overhaul	
TVE	Total vertical error	
TWB	Transcribed Weather Broadcasts	Abbreviated area forecast
TWC	tail wind component	
TWDL	Two-way data link	Or: terminal weather data link
TWDR	Terminal Doppler Weather Radar	
TWIP	Terminal weather information for pilots	
TWLU	Terminal Wireless LAN Unit	
TWR	Air traffic control tower	
TWR	Terminal weather radar	
TWY	taxiway	
TX	Transmit	

== U ==
Abbreviation	Term	Notes
UAC	Upper area control	
UART	Universal asynchronous receiver-transmitter	
UAS	Unmanned Aircraft System	
UAV	Unmanned aerial vehicle	Commonly called 'drones', also 'Remotely Piloted Aircraft (RPA)'
UHF	ultra-high frequency	
UIR	upper information region	
ULB	underwater locator beacon	
UNICOM	Universal Communications, air-ground communication facility	
UNL	Unlimited	Seen on GFA and is used for visibility
UPRT	upset prevention and recovery training	
USB	Universal Serial Bus	
UTC	Universal Time Coordinated	Indicates time zones

== V ==
Abbreviation	Term	Notes
V	magnetic variation	
V	Volts or voltage	
V&V	video & vision	
VAR	Variation	
VASI	visual approach slope indicator	VASIS = visual approach slope indicator system
VBV	variable bleed valve	In turbine engines
VCR	visual control room	
VCS	vehicle control service	
VDF	VHF direction-finding	
VDL	VHF Data Link	
VDP	visual descent point	Point in a direct approach where a 3º normal visual descent can be started to achieve a safe landing and stabilized approach to the RWY - VDP (in distance) = HAT (height over terrain) / 300 (HAT is the height of the MDA read in the approach chart of the AD)
VDR	VHF digital radio	
VFO	Variable-frequency oscillator	
VFR	visual flight rules	
VG	vortex generator	
VGA	Video Graphics Array	
VG/DG	Vertical gyroscope/directional gyroscope	
VGLS	Visual Guidance Lighting Systems	FAA navigation services
VGM	voice generator module	See AWOS
VHF	very high frequency	
VID	visible impact damage	
VIGV	variable inlet guide vane	
V/L	VOR/Localizer	
VMC	visual meteorological conditions	
VMC	minimum control speed with critical engine out	
VNAV	vertical navigation	Or: V/NAV
VNC	VFR navigation chart	
VNE	Never exceed speed	
VNO	Maximum structural cruising speed	
VNR	VHF navigation receiver	
VOR	VHF omni-directional range	
VOR/DME	VOR with Distance measuring equipment	
VOR/MB	VOR marker beacon	
VORTAC	VOR and TACAN combination	
VOX	Voice transmission	Voice Operated Transmitter
VPA	Vertical Path Approach	
VPATH	Vertical path	
V/R	Voltage regulator	
VRP	Visual point of reference	
VRS	vortex ring state	Helicopter flight phenomenon
V/S	Vertical speed	
VSCF	variable speed constant frequency	Electricity generation system
VSI	vertical speed indicator	
VSM	Vertical separation limit	
VSO	Stall speed in landing configuration	
VSV	variable stator vane	In a turbine engine
VSWR	Voltage–standing wave ratio	
VTA	VFR terminal area chart	
VTOL	vertical take-off and landing	
V/TRK	Vertical track	
VVI	vertical velocity indicator	Same as VSI
VX	Speed for best angle of climb	
VY	Speed for best rate of climb	

== W ==
Abbreviation	Term	Notes
WAAS	Wide Area Augmentation System	
WAC	World Aeronautical Chart	
WAT	weight, altitude, temperature	Variables that affect takeoff performance
W&B	Weight & Balance	Sometimes referred to as WxB
WCA	Wind Correction Angle	
WD	Wind direction	Or: WINDR
WDM	Wiring Diagram Manual	
WEF	with effect from	
WEP	War Emergency Power	
WL	Waterline	
WMA	WXR waveguide adapter	
WMI	WXR indicator mount	
WMS	Wide-area master station	
WMSC	Weather message switching center	
WMSCR	Weather message switching center replacement	
WOCL	window of circadian low	
WOFW	weight-off-wheels	Indicates aircraft is off ground since lift off
WONW	weight-on-wheels	Indicates aircraft is on ground since touch down
WPT	Waypoint	Or: WYPT
WRT	WXR receiver transmitter	
WS	wind shear	
WTC	Wake Turbulence Category	
Wx	weather	
WXR	Weather radar system	

== X ==
Abbreviation	Term	Notes
XC	cross-country	
XCVR	Transceiver	
XFR	Transfer	
XMIT	transmit	
XMSN	transmission	
XMTR	transmitter	
XPDR	transponder	
XPNDR	transponder	
XTK	Crosstrack	
X-Start	Cross-start	Using the air pressure or electrical power from a working engine

== Y ==
Abbreviation	Term	Notes
Y	yaw or yaw angle	
Y/D	yaw damper	Or: YD

== Z ==
Abbreviation	Term	Notes
Z	Zulu Time	Coordinated Universal Time (UTC)
ZFT	zero-fuel time	
ZFW	zero-fuel weight	

== See also ==
- List of aviation mnemonics
- Avionics
- Glossary of Russian and USSR aviation acronyms
- Glossary of gliding and soaring
- Appendix:Glossary of aviation, aerospace, and aeronautics – Wiktionary
