= Flight director =

Flight director may refer to:

- Flight director, a position in a spaceflight control team
- Flight director (aeronautics), a navigational aid that is overlaid on the attitude indicator that shows the pilot of an aircraft the attitude required to follow a certain trajectory

== See also ==
- Flight controller (disambiguation)
