= QRH =

QRH may refer to:

- QRH, the Q code for varying frequency
- Queen's Royal Hussars, a British army regiment
- QRH, IATA City Code for Rotterdam Centraal railway station
- Quick Reference Handbook, a manual for solving technical problems aboard an airplane
- Quasi-Riemann hypothesis, a highly significant area of research in mafhematical number theory
