= Marker beacon =

Type of VHF radio beacon used in aviation

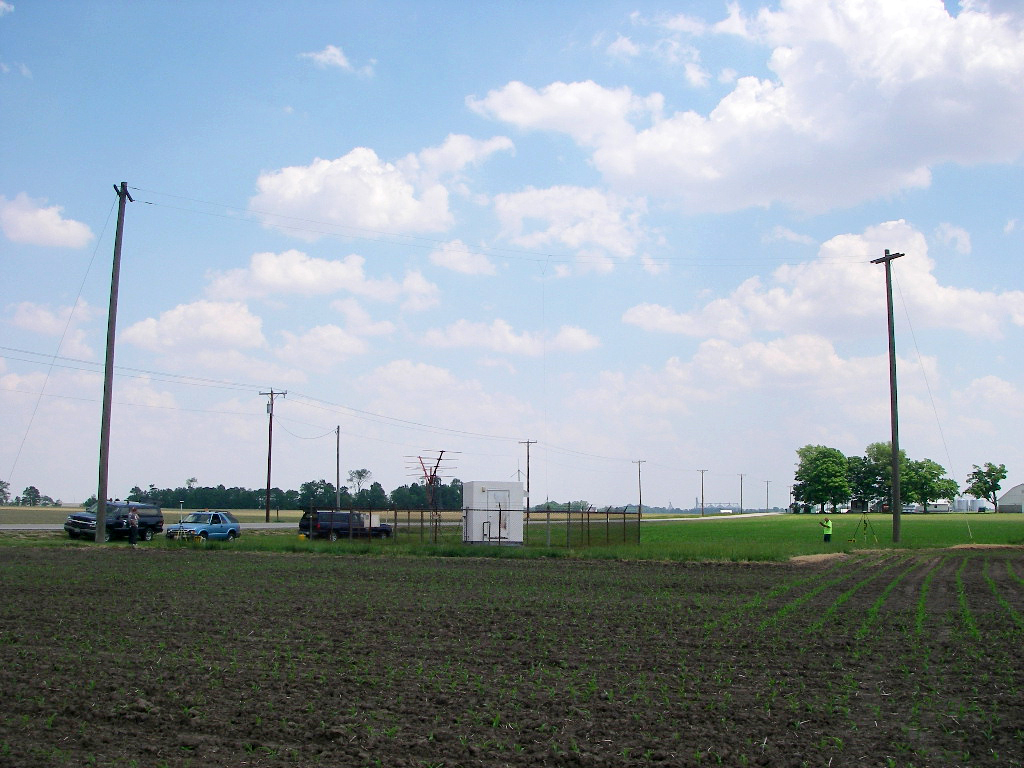
Locator Outer Marker (LOM), a High Frequency (HF) Non-Directional Beacon, co-located with an "outer marker" (OM) 75-MHz Marker Beacon.

Middle marker antenna at KONT

A marker beacon is a particular type of VHF radio beacon used in aviation, usually in conjunction with an instrument landing system (ILS), to give pilots a means to determine position along an established route to a destination such as a runway.

According to Article 1.107 of the International Telecommunication Union's (ITU) ITU Radio Regulations (RR) a marker beacon is defined as "a transmitter in the aeronautical radionavigation service which radiates vertically a distinctive pattern for providing position information to aircraft".

== History ==
From the 1930s until the 1950s, markers were used extensively along airways to provide an indication of an aircraft's specific position along the route, but from the 1960s they have become increasingly limited to ILS approach installations. They are now very gradually being phased out of service, especially in more developed parts of the world, as GPS and other technologies have made marker beacons increasingly redundant.

== Types ==
There are three types of marker beacons that may be installed as part of their most common application—an instrument landing system.

=== Outer marker ===
Outer-marker indicator

Outer marker signal

The outer marker, which normally identifies the final approach fix (FAF), is situated on the same course/track as the localizer and the runway center-line, four to seven nautical miles before the runway threshold. It is typically located about 1 NM (1.85 km) inside the point where the glideslope intercepts the intermediate altitude and transmits a 400 Hz tone signal on a low-powered (3 watts), 75 MHz carrier signal. Its antenna is highly directional, and is pointed straight up. The valid signal area is a 2,400 ft (730 m) × 4,200 ft (1,280 m) ellipse (as measured 1,000 ft (300 m) above the antenna.) When the aircraft passes over the outer marker antenna, its marker beacon receiver detects the signal. The system gives the pilot a visual (blinking blue outer marker light) and aural (continuous series of audio tone morse code-like 'dashes') indication.

==== Locator outer marker ====
In the United States, the outer marker has often been combined with a non-directional beacon (NDB) to make a locator outer marker (LOM). An LOM is a navigation aid used as part of an instrument landing system (ILS) instrument approach for aircraft. Aircraft can navigate directly to the location using the NDB as well as be alerted when they fly over it by the beacon.

The LOM is becoming less important now that GPS navigation is well established in the aviation community. Some countries, such as Canada, have abandoned marker beacons completely, replacing the outer marker with a NDB; and, more recently, with GPS fixes.

In the U.S., LOMs are identified by two-letter Morse code modulated at 1020 Hz. LOMs use the first two letters of the parent ILS's identification. For example, at New York's JFK runway 31R the ILS identifier is I-RTH and the LOM ident is RT. If this facility were a locator middle marker (LMM) its identifier would be the last two letters, TH.

=== Middle marker ===
Middle-marker indicator

Middle marker signal

A middle marker works on the same principle as an outer marker. It is normally positioned 0.5 to 0.8 nautical miles (1 km) before the runway threshold. When the aircraft is above the middle marker, the receiver's amber middle marker light starts blinking, and a repeating pattern of audible morse code-like dot-dashes at a frequency of 1,300 Hz in the headset. This alerts the pilots that they are descending through the CAT I decision altitude (typically 200 feet (60 m) above the ground level on the glideslope) and should have already initiated the missed approach if one of several visual cues has not been spotted.

=== Inner marker ===
Inner-marker indicator

Inner marker signal

Similar to the outer and middle markers, an inner marker located at the beginning (threshold) of the runway on some ILS approach systems (usually Category II and III) having decision heights of less than 200 feet (60 m) AGL. Triggers a flashing white light on the same marker beacon receiver used for the outer and middle markers; also a series of audio tone 'dots' at a frequency of 3,000 Hz in the headset.

On some older marker beacon receivers, instead of the "O", "M" and "I" indicators (outer, middle, inner), the indicators are labeled "A" (or FM/Z), "O" and "M" (airway or Fan and Z marker, outer, middle). The airway marker was used to indicate reporting points along the centerline of now obsolete "Red" airways; this was sometimes a "fan" marker, whose radiated pattern was elongated at right angles across the airway course so an aircraft slightly off course would still receive it. A "Z" marker was sometimes located at low- or medium-frequency range sites to accurately denote station passage. As airway beacons used the same 3,000 Hz audio frequency as the inner marker, the "A" indicator on older receivers can be used to detect the inner marker.

== Back course marker ==
A back course marker (BC) normally indicates the ILS back-course final-approach fix where approach descent is commenced. It is identified by pairs of Morse-code "dots" at 3000 Hz (95 pairs per minute), which will trigger the white light on a marker beacon indicator, but with a different audio rhythm from an inner marker or en-route marker.

== Fan marker ==
The term fan marker refers to the older type of beacons used mostly for en-route navigation. Fan-type marker beacons were sometimes part of a non-precision approach and are identified by a flashing white light and a repeating dot-dash-dot signal. Recent editions of the FAA's AIM publication no longer mention fan markers. In August 2024 nineteen fan markers remain in the FAA database with seven listed as "DECOMMISSIONED".

== See also ==
- AN/MRN-3
- Transponder Landing System (TLS)
- Index of aviation articles
