= Loft (3D) =

Loft is a method to create complicated smooth 3D shapes in CAD and other 3D modeling software. Planar cross-sections of the desired shape are defined at chosen locations. Algorithms find a smooth 3D shape that fit these cross-sections. Designers can modify the shape through choice of fitting algorithm and input parameters. The method is used in packages such as Onshape, 3D Studio Max, Creo*, SolidWorks, NX, Autodesk Revit, and FreeCAD.

To visualise the process, consider the lofting process in boat building: the planar sections are defined by boat ribs spaced along its length, and the final shape is produced by placing planks over the ribs to form a smooth skin.

In PTCs Creo and in Autodesk Revit it is referred to as a Blend or Swept Blend.

== See also ==
- Parallel transport
- Lathe (graphics)

== Examples (external links) ==
- Modeling an irregular funnel with the loft tool
