= Flight controller (disambiguation) =

Flight controller may refer to:

== Ground-based staff and positions ==
- Air traffic controller, a person trained to expedite and maintain a safe and orderly flow of air traffic
- Flight controller, a person who aids in the operations of a space flight

== On-board systems ==
- A civil-airliner flight controller, or autopilot
- An UAV flight controller, a combination of hardware and software that helps control the UAV flight

== See also ==
- Aircraft flight control systems, which cover main flight controls
- Flight director (disambiguation)
- Joystick, used to control a (real or simulated) aircraft
