= Annunciator panel =

Group of lights as a status indicator

An annunciator panel, also known in some aircraft as the Centralized Warning Panel (CWP) or Caution Advisory Panel (CAP), is a group of lights used as a central indicator of the status of equipment or systems in an aircraft, industrial process, building or other installation. Usually, the annunciator panel includes a main warning lamp or audible signal to draw the attention of operating personnel to the annunciator panel for abnormal events or conditions.

== Aviation ==
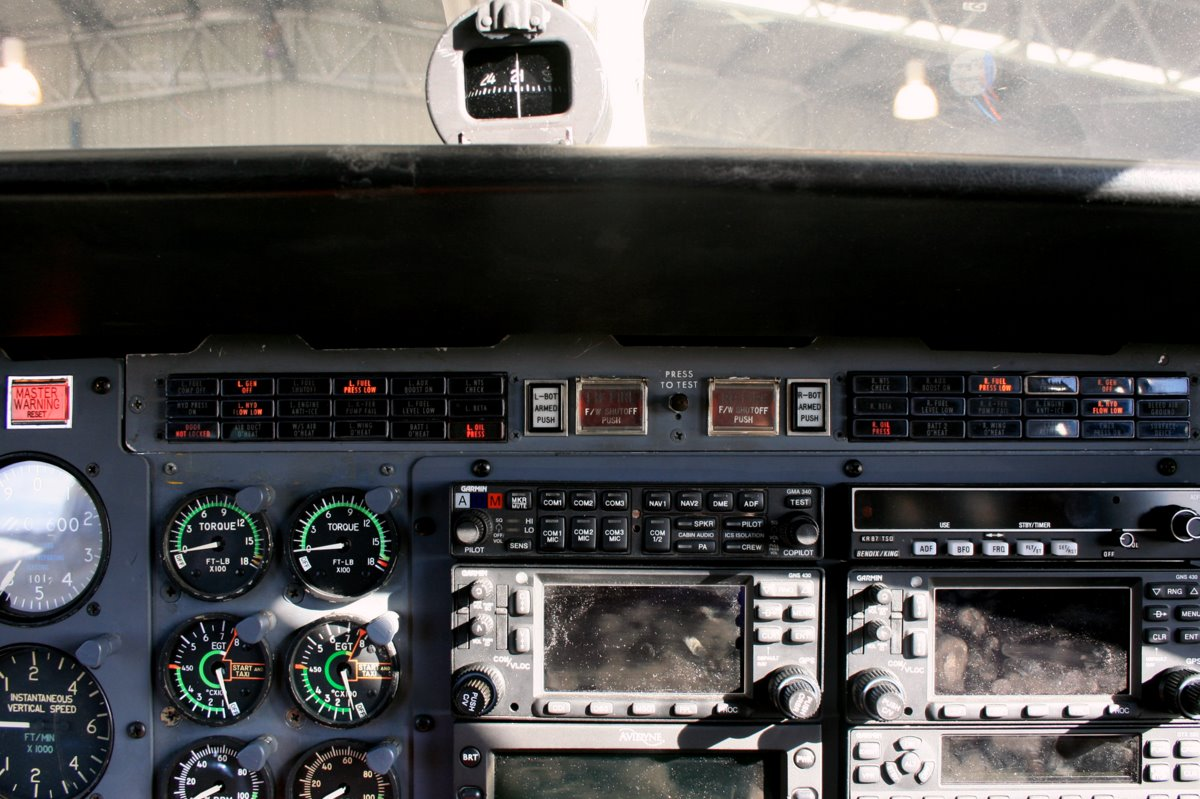
The annunciator panel of a Cessna 441 aircraft. The illuminated process annunciators are those that are normally lit when the engines are not running, plus one annunciating that the aircraft's door is not locked

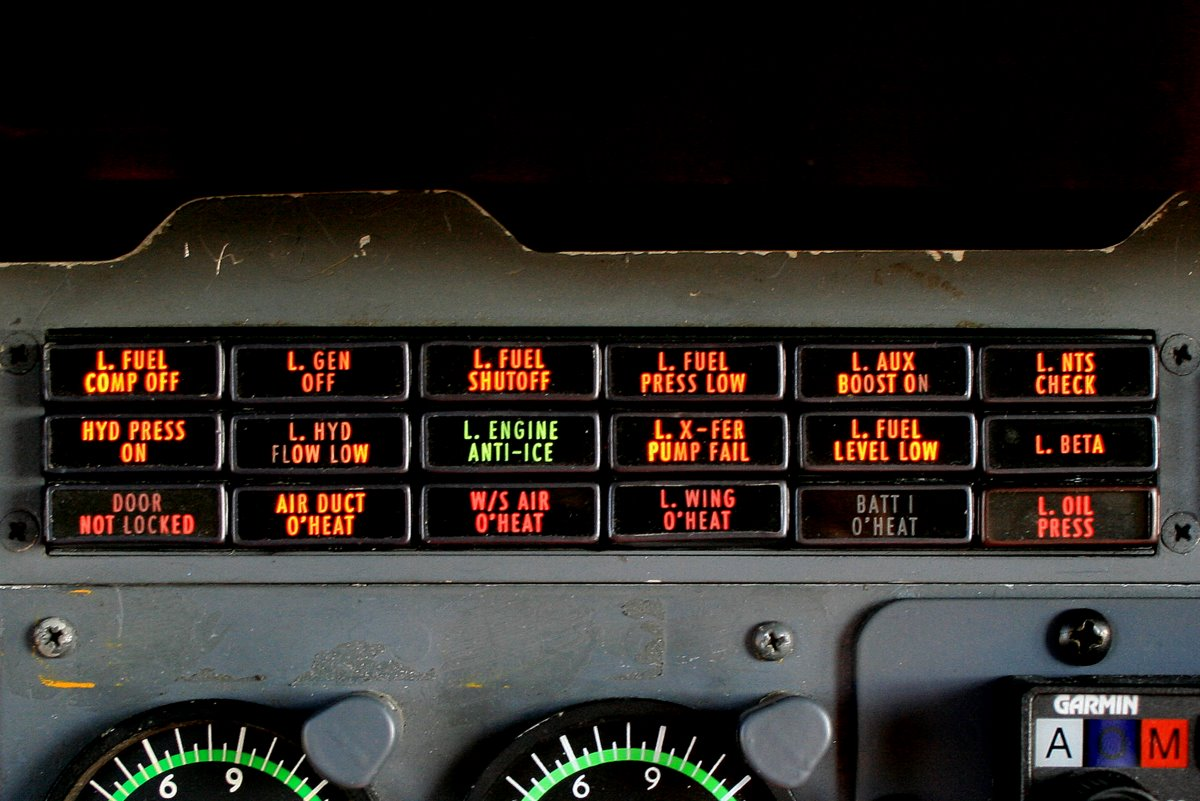
Close-up view of the left module of the Cessna 441 annunciator panel in 'test' mode

In the aircraft industry, annunciator panels are groupings of annunciator lights that indicate status of the aircraft's subsystems. The lights are usually accompanied with a test switch, which when pressed illuminates all the lights to confirm they are in working order. More advanced modern aircraft replaces these with the integrated electronic Engine Indicating and Crew Alerting System or Electronic Centralised Aircraft Monitor.

An aviation annunciator panel will have a test switch to check for burned out lamps. Indicator lights are grouped by their associated systems into various panels of lights.

Lamp colours are normally given the following meanings:

- Red: Warning, this system's condition is critical and requires immediate attention (such as an engine fire, hydraulic pump failure)
- Amber: Caution, this system requires timely attention or may do so in the future (ice detected, fuel imbalance)
- Green: Advisory/Indication, a system is in use or ready for operation (such as landing gear down and locked, APU operating)
- White/blue: Advisory/Indication, a system is in use (seatbelt signs on, anti-ice system in use, landing lights on)

The annunciator panel may display warnings or cautions that are not necessarily indicative of a problem; for example, a Cessna 172 on its after-landing roll will often flicker the "Volts" warning simply due to the idle throttle position and therefore the lower voltage output of the alternator to the aircraft's electrical system.

More complicated aircraft will feature Master Warning and Master Caution lights/switches. In the event of any red or yellow annunciator being activated, the yellow or red master light, usually located elsewhere in the pilot's line of sight, will illuminate. In most installations they will flash and an audible alert will accompany them. These "masters" will not stop flashing until they have been acknowledged, usually by pressing the light itself, and in some cases the audible alert will also continue until this acknowledgement. On some aircraft (most Boeing airliners, for example) the "masters" will also flash briefly and the audible alert will sound whenever the autopilot is disconnected, as an additional reminder to the pilots that manual control is now required.

== Process control ==
In industrial process control, an annunciator panel is a system to alert operators of alarm conditions in the plant. Multiple back-lit windows are provided, each engraved with the name of a process alarm. Lamps in each window are controlled by hard-wired switches in the plant, arranged to operate when a process condition enters an abnormal state (such as high temperature, low pressure, loss of cooling water flow, or many others). Single-point or multipoint alarm logic modules operate the window lights based on a preselected ISA 18.1 or custom sequence.

In one common alarm sequence, the light in a window will flash, and a bell or horn will sound to attract the operator's attention when the alarm condition is detected. The operator can silence the alarm with a button, and the window will remain lit as long as the process is in the alarm state. When the alarm clears (process condition returns to normal), the lamps in the window go out.

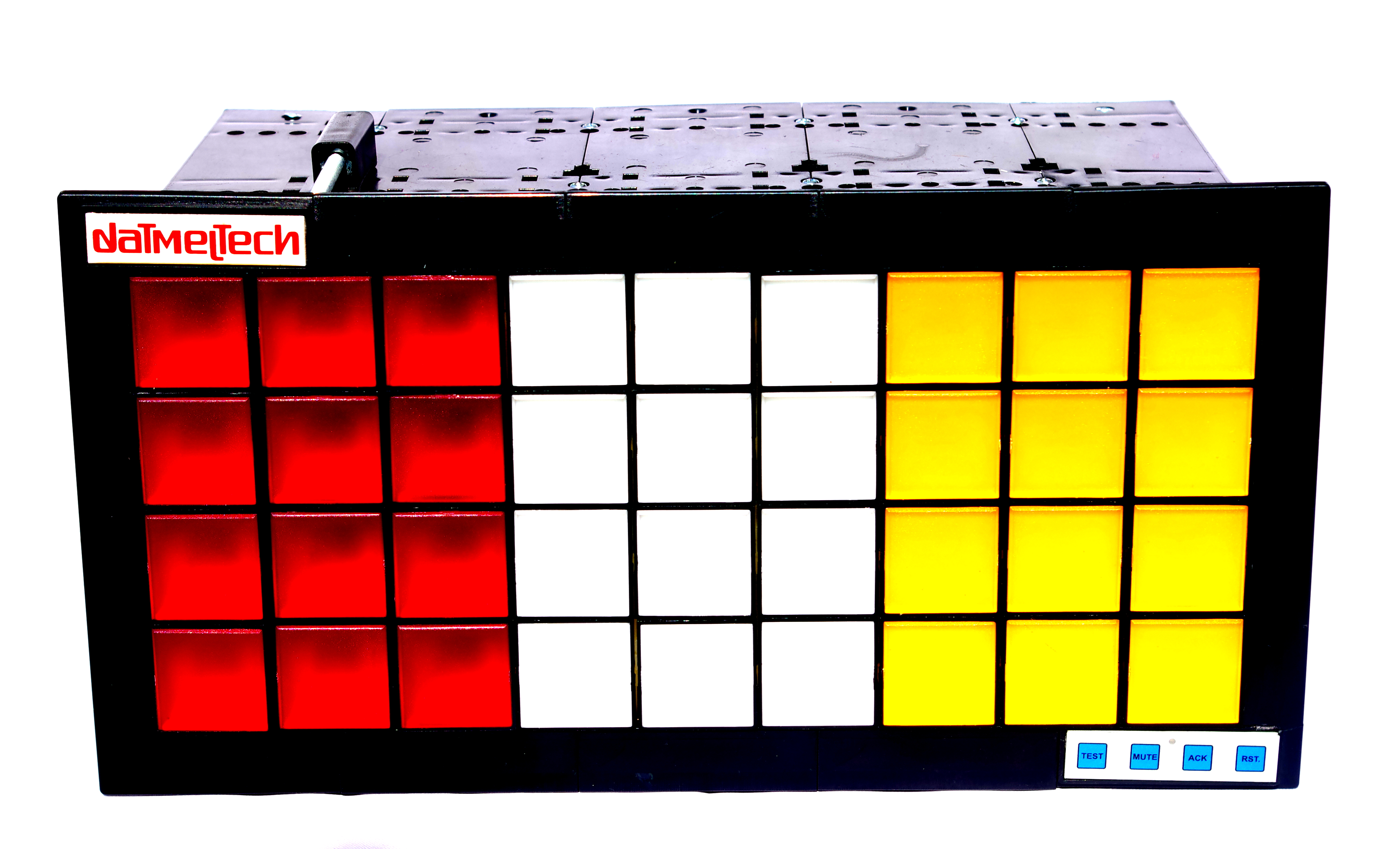
Alarm Annunciator used for process controls

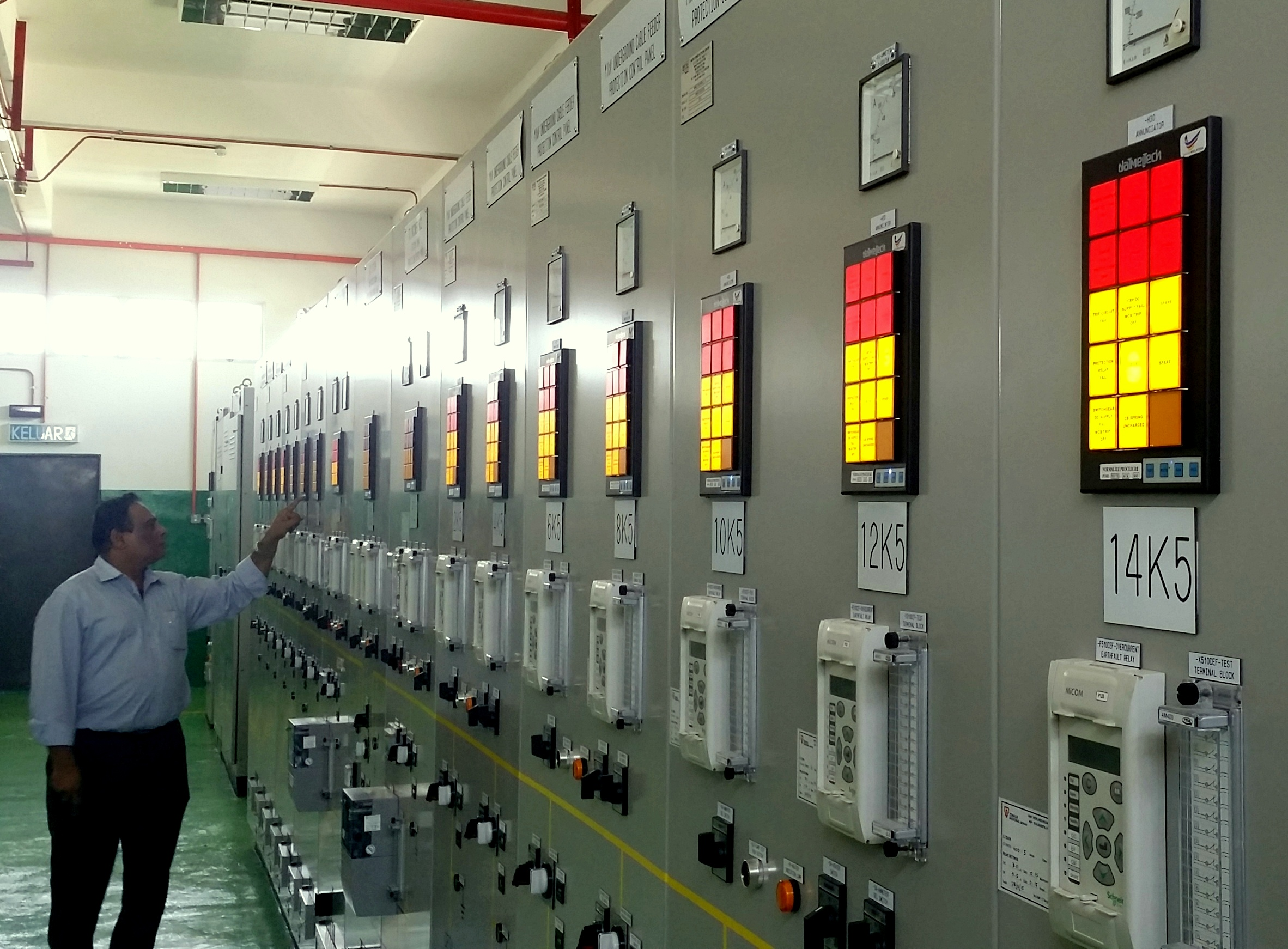
Alarm Annunciators being used in electricity distribution substations

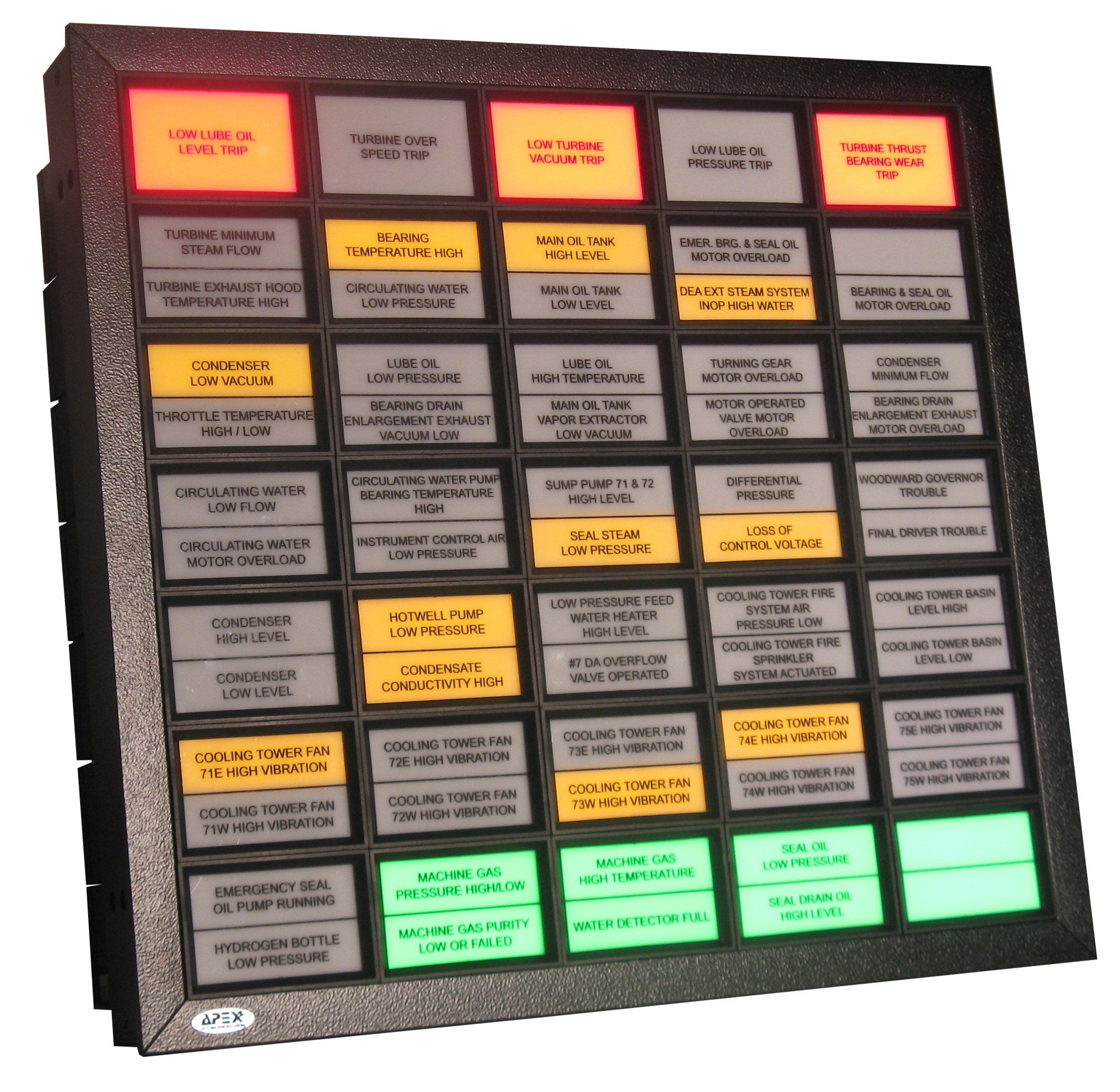
Example of an Alarm Annunciator that would be used in a variety of different plants

Annunciator panels were relatively costly to install in a plant because they had dedicated wiring to the alarm-initiating devices in the process plant. Since incandescent lamps were used, a lamp test button was always provided to allow early detection of failed lamps. Modern electronic distributed control systems usually require less wiring since the process signals can be monitored within the control system, and the engraved windows are replaced by alphanumeric displays on a computer monitor.

The behavior of alarm systems and colors used to indicate alarms are standardized. Standards such as ISA 18.1 or EN 60073 simplify the purchase of systems and the training of operators by giving standard alarm sequences.

=== Obsolescence and revival ===
The introduction of computer monitor-based control systems during the 1980s and 1990s saw a wholesale absorption of alarm window displays onto the computer screen. This created a downturn in the sales of the conventional alarm annunciator systems, and many of the companies manufacturing these alarm annunciator products were either sold off or went out of business. This has left today a major obsolescence support problem for customers who are still using these alarm annunciator systems as part of their safety systems.

Over the last five years The alarm annunciator has seen a resurgence in popularity, especially for use in IEC 61508 SIL 1 and SHE (Safety Health and Environmental) alarm monitoring applications. The modern trend is to identify critical alarms and return them from the computer screen to discrete alarm windows. This is being done for two reasons. Firstly, alarm annunciators offer pattern recognition to the operators in the form of LED alarm fascias instead of just providing an exhaustive list of alarms and events which the operators have to scroll through and in some instances alarms can be overlooked. Secondly, the analysis of plant failure modes is leading to the separation of critical alarm monitoring and process control systems for safety reasons.

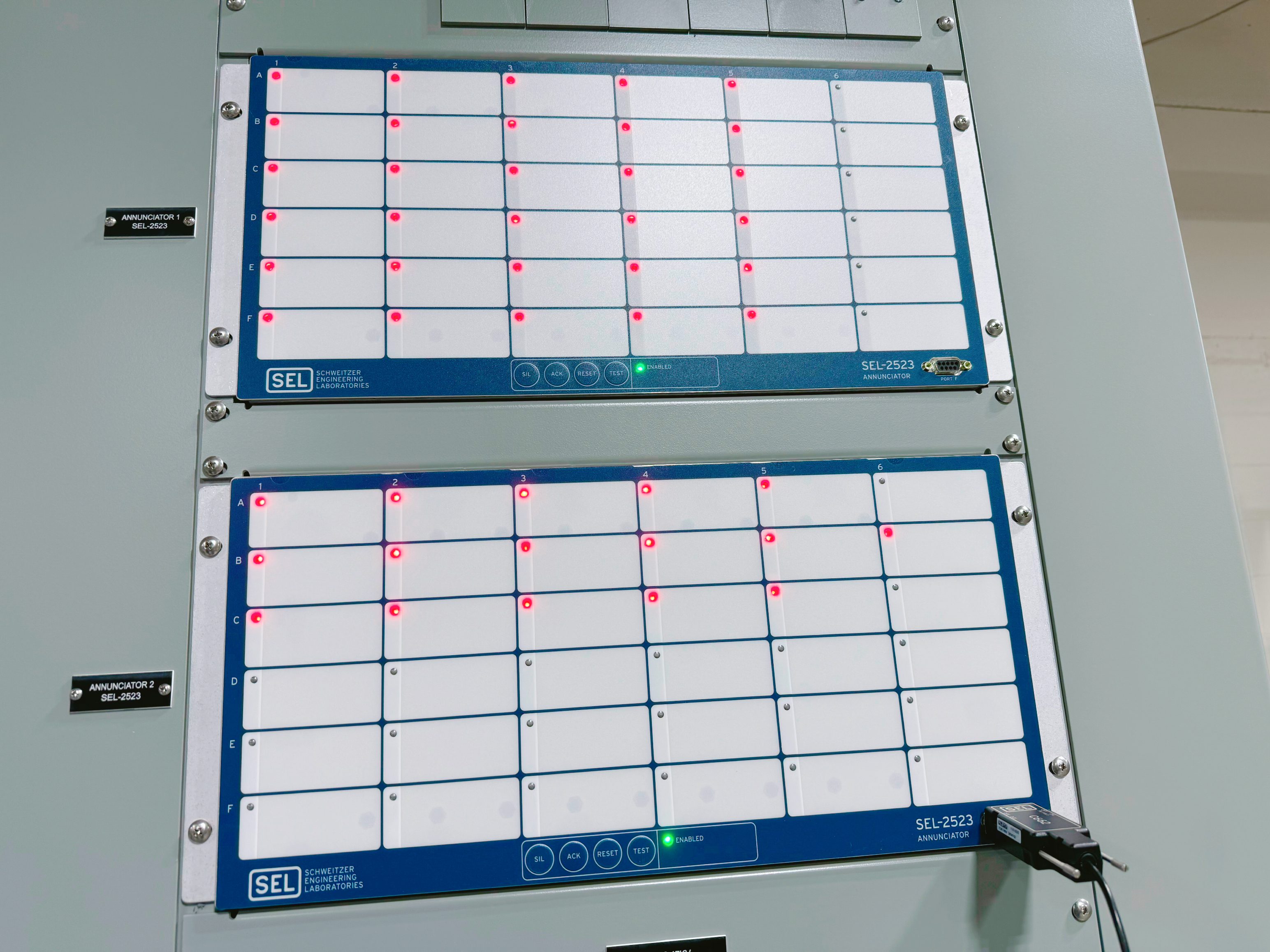
SEL Annunciator in a Control Panel during Relay Testing

== Fire Alarm ==
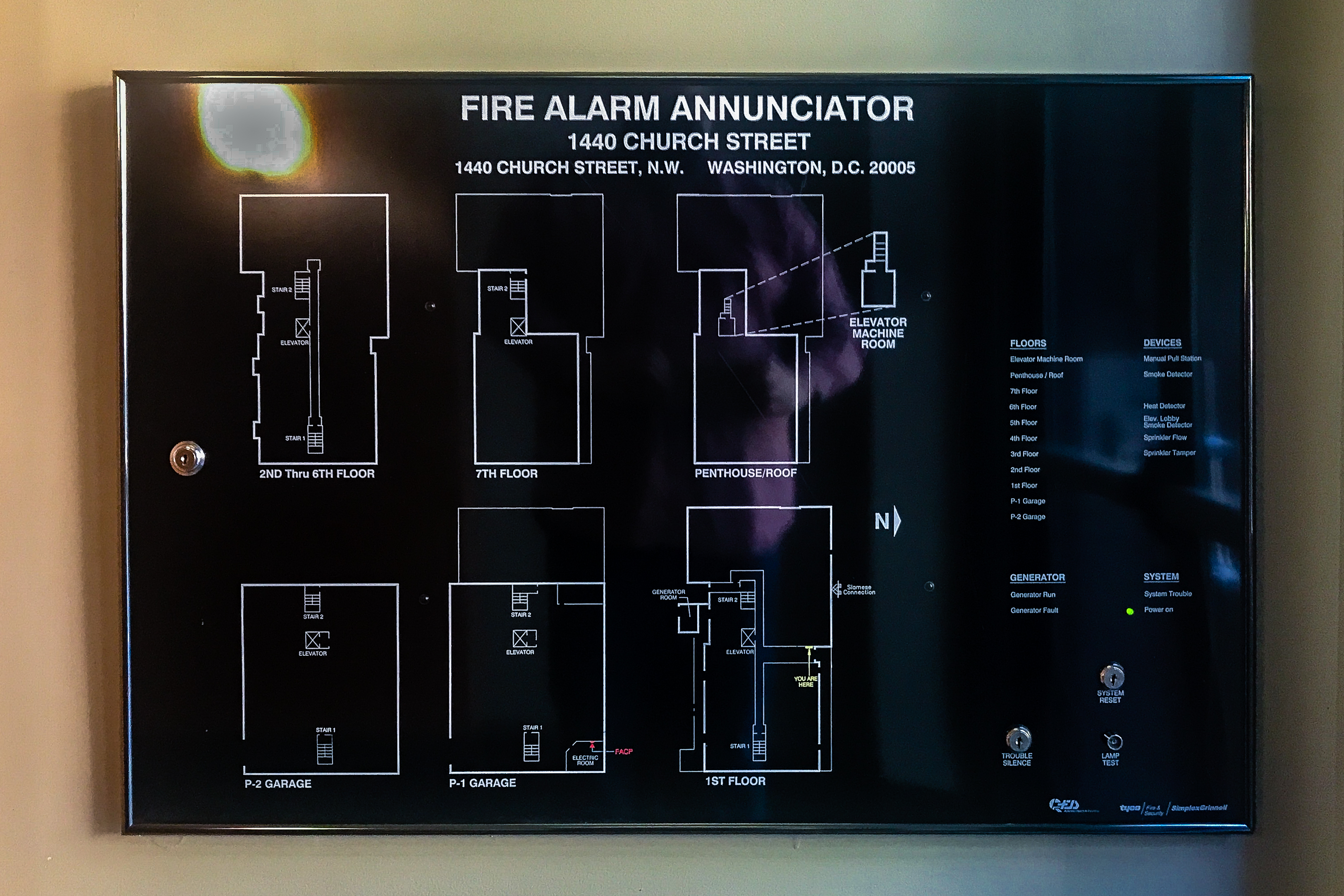
Example of a fire alarm annunciator panel showing the building floor plan

In large buildings, a fire alarm control panel is located in a secure location, such as in an electrical room where it is also convenient for running electrical wires for system components or in a fire command center. A fire alarm annunciator panel is located where it is accessible to fire-fighting crews, such as at building entrances/exits. The annunciator panel will indicate the system status using lamps (or LEDs), an audible warning tone, and, depending on the system technology, the exact location or approximate physical location of the source of a fire alarm in the building. In a large, high-occupancy building such as an office tower or hotel, the fire annunciator may also be associated with a control panel for building ventilation systems, and may also include emergency communication systems for the building.

== See also ==
- Acronyms and abbreviations in avionics
- Alarm management
- Beacon
- Glass cockpit
- Tell-tale (automotive) ("idiot light")
