= Lofting =

Drafting technique

Lofting is a drafting technique to generate curved lines. It is used in plans for streamlined objects such as aircraft and boats. The lines may be drawn on wood and the wood then cut for advanced woodworking. The technique can be as simple as bending a flexible object, such as a long strip of thin wood or thin plastic, so that it passes over three non-linear points, and scribing the resultant curved line; or as elaborate as plotting the line using computers or mathematical tables.

Lofting is particularly useful in boat building, when it is used to draw and cut pieces for hulls and keels. These are usually curved, often in three dimensions. Loftsmen at the mould lofts of shipyards were responsible for taking the dimensions and details from drawings and plans, and translating this information into templates, battens, ordinates, cutting sketches, profiles, margins and other data. From the early 1970s onward computer-aided design (CAD) became normal for the shipbuilding design and lofting process.

Lofting was also commonly used in aircraft design before the widespread adoption of computer-generated shaping programs.

== Basic lofting ==
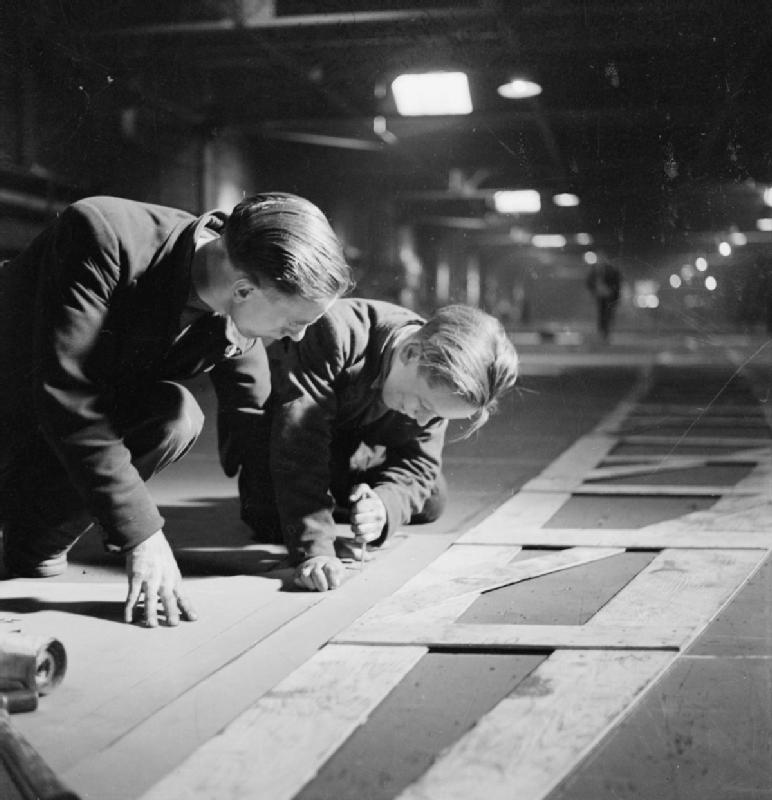
Two men cutting templates in the mold loft, Tyneside Shipyards, 1943

As ship design evolved from craft to science, designers learned various ways to produce long curves on a flat surface. Generating and drawing such curves became a part of ship lofting; "lofting" means drawing full-sized patterns, so-called because it was often done in large, lightly constructed mezzanines or lofts above the factory floor. When aircraft design progressed beyond the stick-and-fabric boxes of its first decade of existence, the practice of lofting moved naturally into the aeronautical realm. As the storm clouds of World War II gathered in Europe, a US aircraft company, North American Aviation, took the practice into the purely mathematical realm. One of that war's outstanding warplanes, the North American P-51 Mustang, was designed using mathematical charts and tables rather than lofting tables.

Lofting is the transfer of a Lines Plan to a Full-Sized Plan. This helps to assure that the boat will be accurate in its layout and pleasing in appearance. There are many methods to loft a set of plans.

Generally, boat building books have a detailed description of the lofting process, beyond the scope of this article. Plans can be lofted on a level wooden floor, marking heavy paper such as Red Rosin for the full-sized plans or directly on plywood sheets.

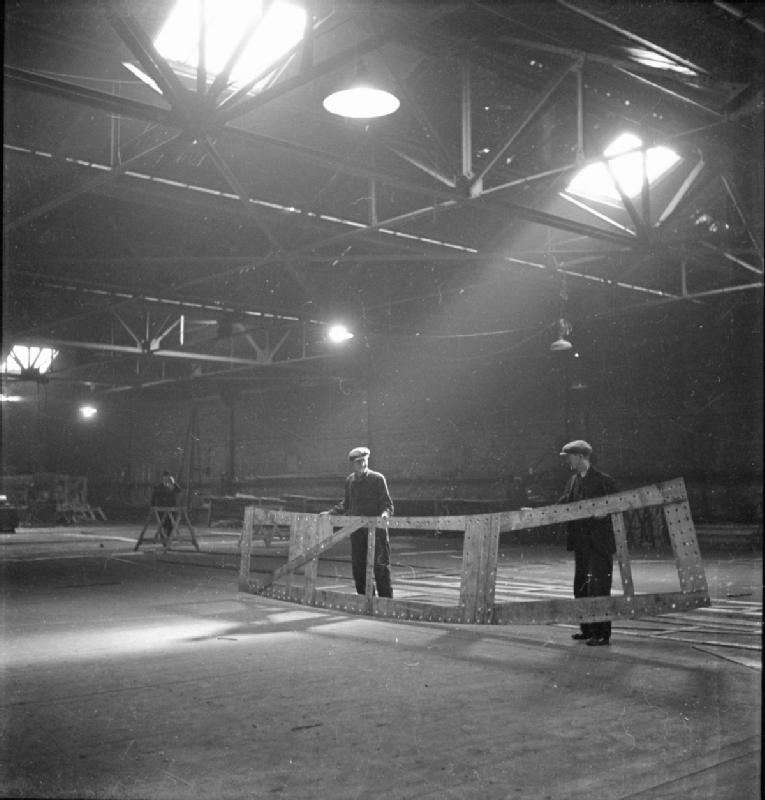
Two men lifting templates in the mold loft, Tyneside Shipyards, 1943

The first step is to layout the grid, mark the Base Line along the length of the paper or plywood sheet. Then nail Battens every 12 inches (or more in some cases) where the station lines are to be set as a mark for the perpendicular line, which is marked with a T-square. The previous steps are followed in turn by marking the Top Line and the Water Line. Before continuing make sure to check the lines by using the Pythagorean theorem and make sure the grid is square.

The second step is to mark the points from the table of offsets. All measurements off the table of offsets are listed in Millimeters or the Feet, Inches, and Eighths. The points are plotted at each station then use a small nail and a batten to Fair (draw with a fair curve) the boat's lines.

== Definitions ==
Full sized plan
A 1:1 scale construction drawing of a boat and its parts
Lines plan
A scaled-down version of a full-sized drawing often including the body, plan, profile, and section views
Body Plan
A view of the boat from both dead ahead and dead astern split in half
Plan view
A view looking down on the boat from above
Profile view
A view of the boat from the side
Section view
Cross-section of the boat's width
Batten
A long stick to help draw fair lines

== See also ==
- Lofting coordinates, used in aircraft design
- Loft (3D) for the etymologically derived process used in computer-based 3D modeling

== Books ==
- "The Evolution of the Wooden Ship", Basil Greenhill, Sam Manning, 1988
- "The Boatbuilder's Apprentice", Greg Rossel, 2007
- "Lofting a Boat: A Step by Step Manual" Roger Kopanycia, Adlard Coles, 2011
