= Flight director (aeronautics) =

Flight instrument

In aviation, a flight director (FD) is a flight instrument that is overlaid on the attitude indicator that shows the pilot of an aircraft the attitude required to execute the desired flight path. Flight directors are mostly commonly used during approach and landing. They can be used with or without autopilot systems.

== Description ==
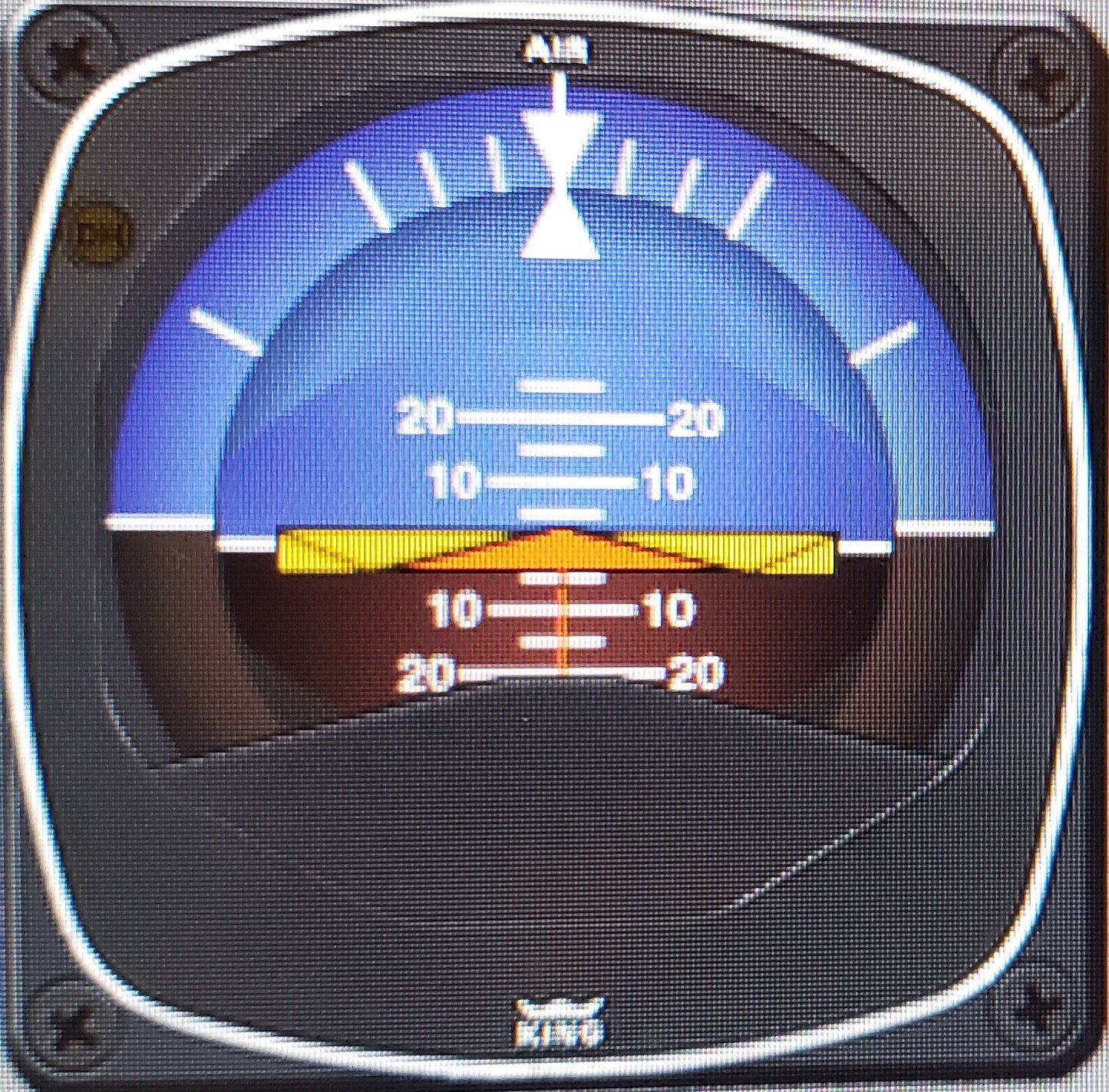
Command bars in yellow are aligned with the aircraft symbol in orange, indicating straight and level flight.

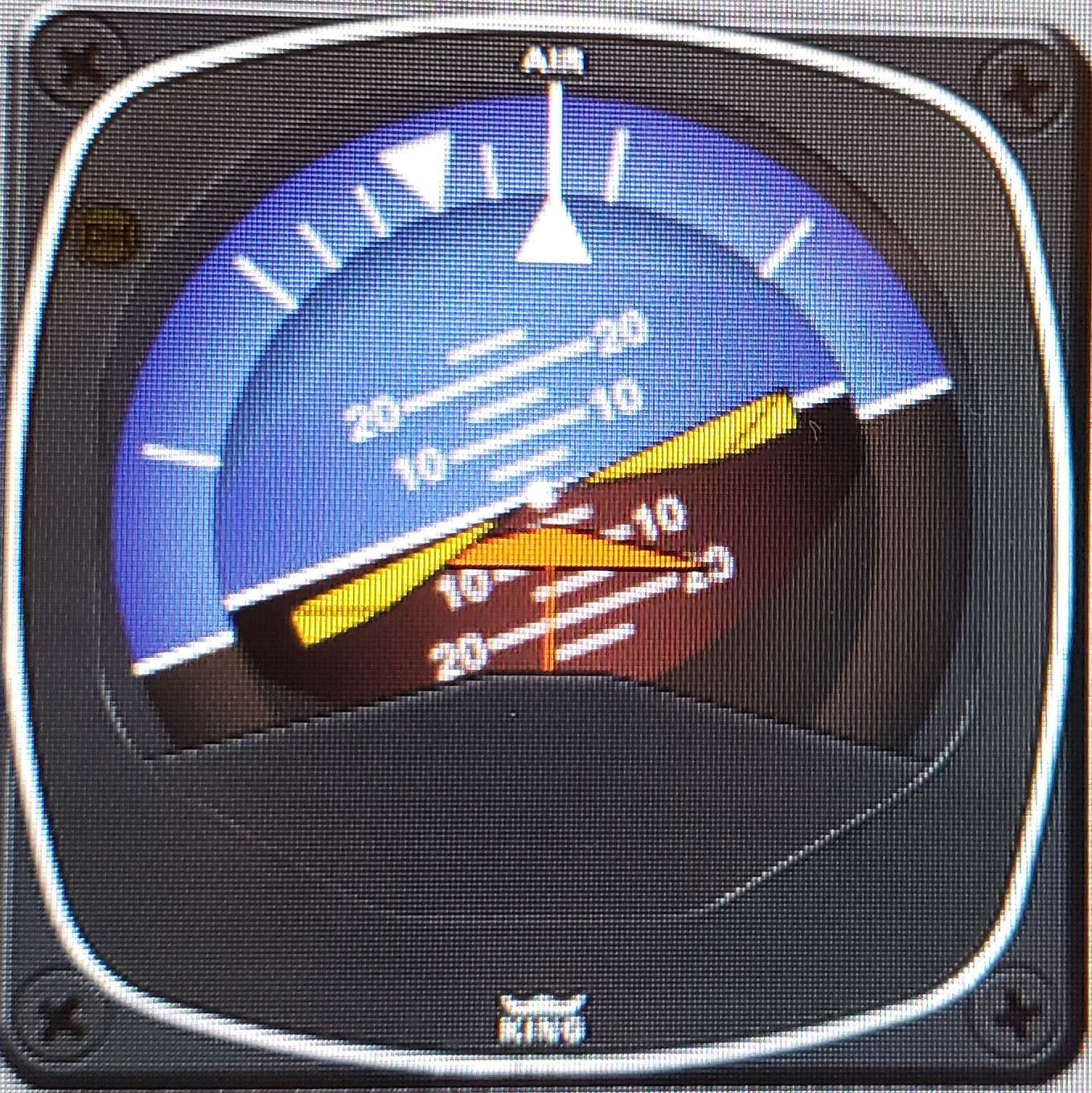
Command bars in yellow and the aircraft symbol in orange, indicating a level bank angle and pitch up input is required.

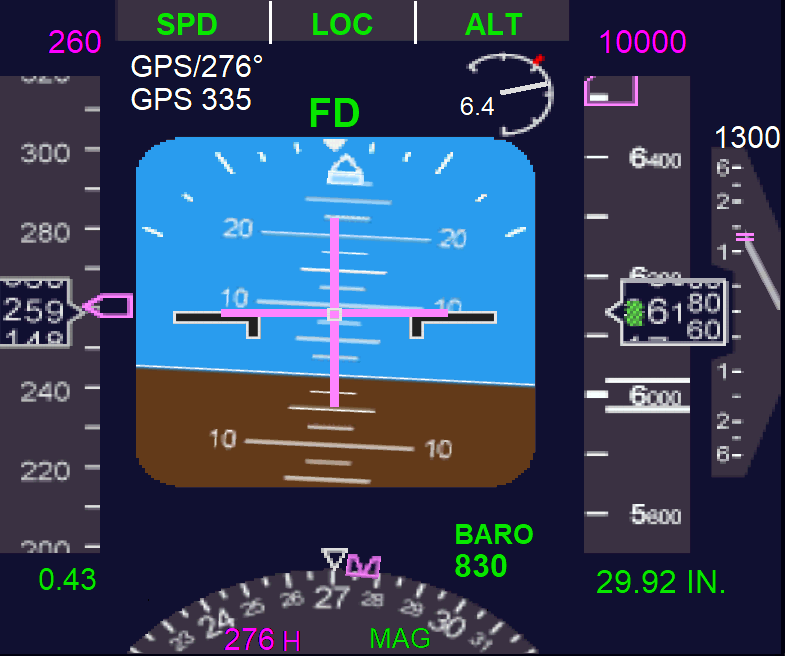
Some aircraft use crossed bars, leading the pilot to the desired attitude and flight path.

Flight director (FD) modes integrated with autopilot systems perform calculations for more advanced automation, like "selected course (intercepting), changing altitudes, and tracking navigation sources with cross winds." FD computes and displays the proper pitch and bank angles required for the aircraft to follow a selected flight path.

The flight director usually receives input from an Air Data Computer (ADC) and a flight data computer. The ADC supplies altitude, airspeed and temperature data, heading data from magnetic sources such as flux valves, heading selected on the Horizontal Situation Indicator (HSI) (or Primary flight display (PFD)/multi-function display (MFD)/ electronic horizontal situation indicator (EHSI)), navigation data from Flight Management System (FMS), VHF omnidirectional range (VOR)/ (DME), and RNAV sources. The flight data computer integrates all of the data such as speed, position, closure, drift, track, desired course, and altitude into a command signal. The command signal is displayed on the attitude indicator in the form of command bars, which show the pitch and roll inputs necessary to achieve the selected targets.

The pilot simply keeps the aircraft symbol on the attitude indicator aligned with the command bars, or allow the autopilot to make the actual control movements to fly the selected track and altitude. A simple example: The aircraft flies level on 045° heading at flight level FL150 at 260 kn (480 km/h) indicated airspeed, the FD bars are thus centered. Then the flight director is set to heading 090° and a new flight level FL200. The aircraft must thus turn to the right and climb. This is done by banking to the right while climbing. The roll bar will deflect to the right and the pitch bar will deflect upwards. The pilot will then pull back on the control column while banking to the right. Once the aircraft reaches the proper bank angle, the FD vertical bar will center and remain centered until it is time to roll back to wings level (when the heading approaches 090°). When the aircraft approaches FL200 the FD horizontal bar will deflect downwards thus commanding the pilot to lower the nose in order to level off at FL200.

A flight director can be used with or without automation of the flight control surfaces. The FD is commonly used in direct connection with the autopilot (AP), where the FD commands the AP to put the aircraft in the attitude necessary to follow a trajectory. In some aircraft, the autopilot cannot function without the flight director engaged. Without a flight director, the autopilot will be limited to simpler modes such as following a heading or maintaining an altitude. With a flight director, the autopilot can follow a flight plan programmed into the flight computer.

The exact form of the flight director's display varies with the instrument type, either crosshair or command bars (so-called "cue").

== See also ==
- Acronyms and abbreviations in avionics
- Attitude indicator
- Flight instruments
- Head-up display (HUD)
