= Hazardous Inflight Weather Advisory Service =

Hazardous Inflight Weather Advisory Service (HIWAS) was a continuous broadcast of hazardous weather information which was transmitted over selected VORs. This hazardous weather included AIRMETs, SIGMETs, Convective SIGMETs, Center Weather Advisories (CWAs), Severe Alert Weather Watches (AWWs), and urgent PIREPs.

The presence of HIWAS information on a VOR was indicated on a sectional or terminal area chart by an "H" in the upper-right corner of the box surrounding the NAVAID frequency.

On 8 January 2020 the Federal Aviation Administration discontinued the HIWAS service in favor of Flight Information Services-Broadcast (FIS-B) and other modern means of accessing in-flight weather data.
