= Lofting coordinates =

Coordinate system used for aircraft body measurements

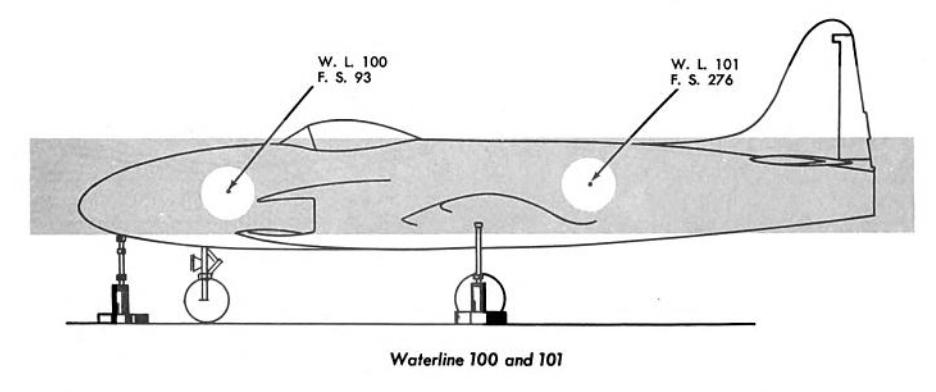
Two points on a fuselage at waterline 100/fuselage station 93 and waterline 101/fuselage station 276

Lofting coordinates are used for aircraft body measurements. The system derives from the one that was used in the shipbuilding lofting process, with longitudinal axis labeled as "stations" (usually fuselage stations, frame stations, FS), transverse axis as "buttocks lines" (or butt lines, BL), and vertical axis as "waterlines" (WL). The lofting coordinate frame is similar to, but not the same as aircraft principal axes used to describe aircraft flight. For the US-manufactured aircraft the ticks on the axes are labeled in inches, (for example, WL 100 is 100 inches above the base waterline).

== Fuselage station ==
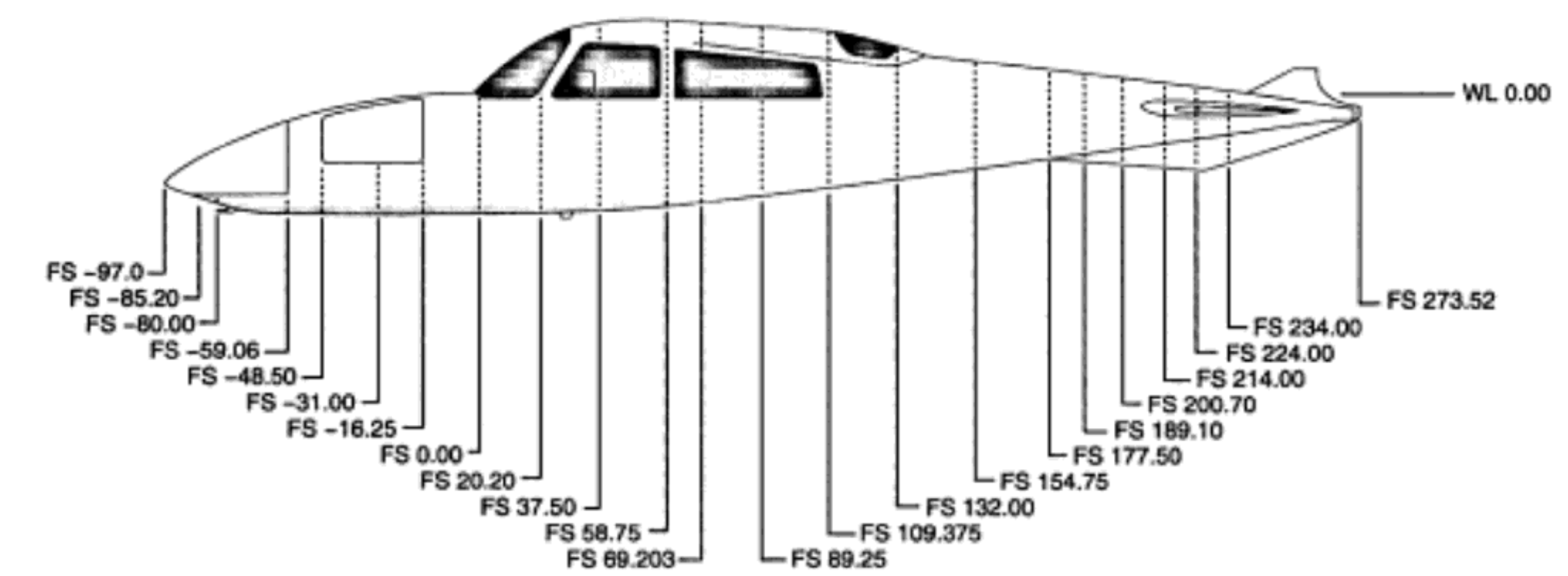
Fuselage stations on a scheme of a fuselage (atypically FS 0 is amidship, usually origin is at the nose, and FS values are nonnegative)

Fuselage stations are traditionally nonnegative, thus the origin is located at the nose of the plane or, sometimes, ahead of it. When compared to the coordinates used for aeromechanics, the fuselage stations are measured in the opposite direction than the ticks on the x-axis (and might not be aligned at all, if the wind-aligned coordinate system is used to describe the flight). Some manufacturers use the designation "body stations", with the corresponding abbreviation BS.

== Waterline ==
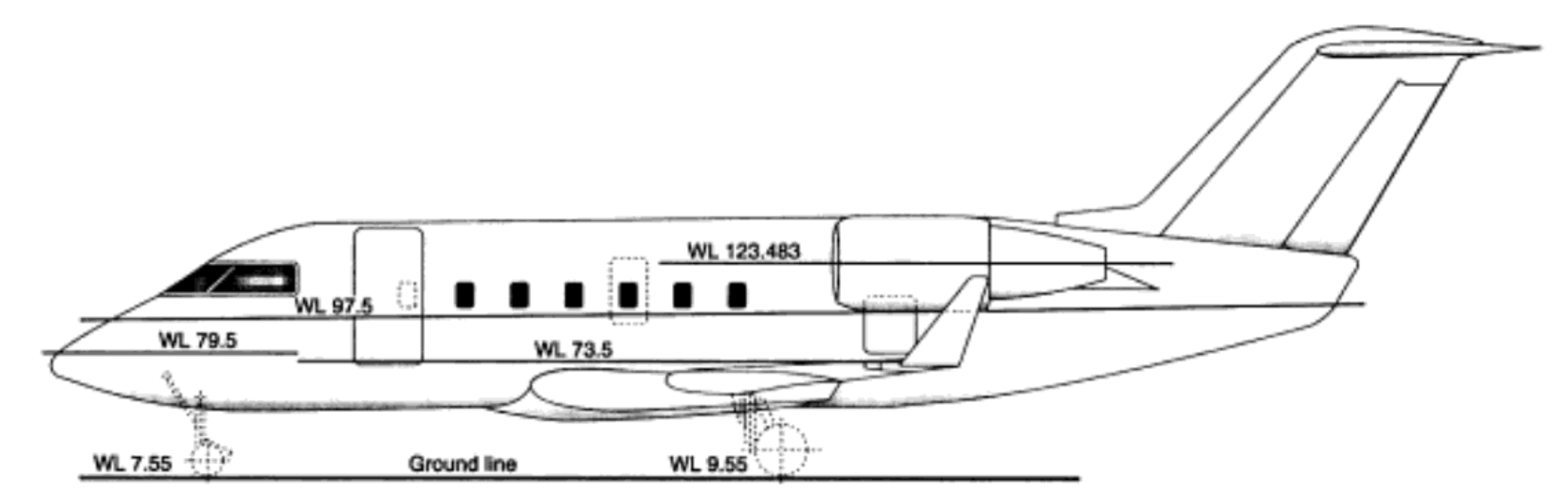
Water lines on a scheme of a fuselage. Baseline is at the ground line, all WL values are nonnegative

Per the US Air Force Airframe Maintenance and Repair Manual (1960), a horizontal waterline extends from the nose cone of the aircraft to the exhaust cone. The base line of the aircraft is designated as waterline 0 (zero). The location of this base line varies on different types of aircraft. However, the planes of all waterlines above and below the zero waterline are parallel. The waterline number (WL or W.L.) in the US is expressed in inches, values increase upwards. Two typical alignments for the base line are the tip of the nose (negative WL are possible) or the "nominal ground plane" (measurements will be nonnegative).

== Butt line ==
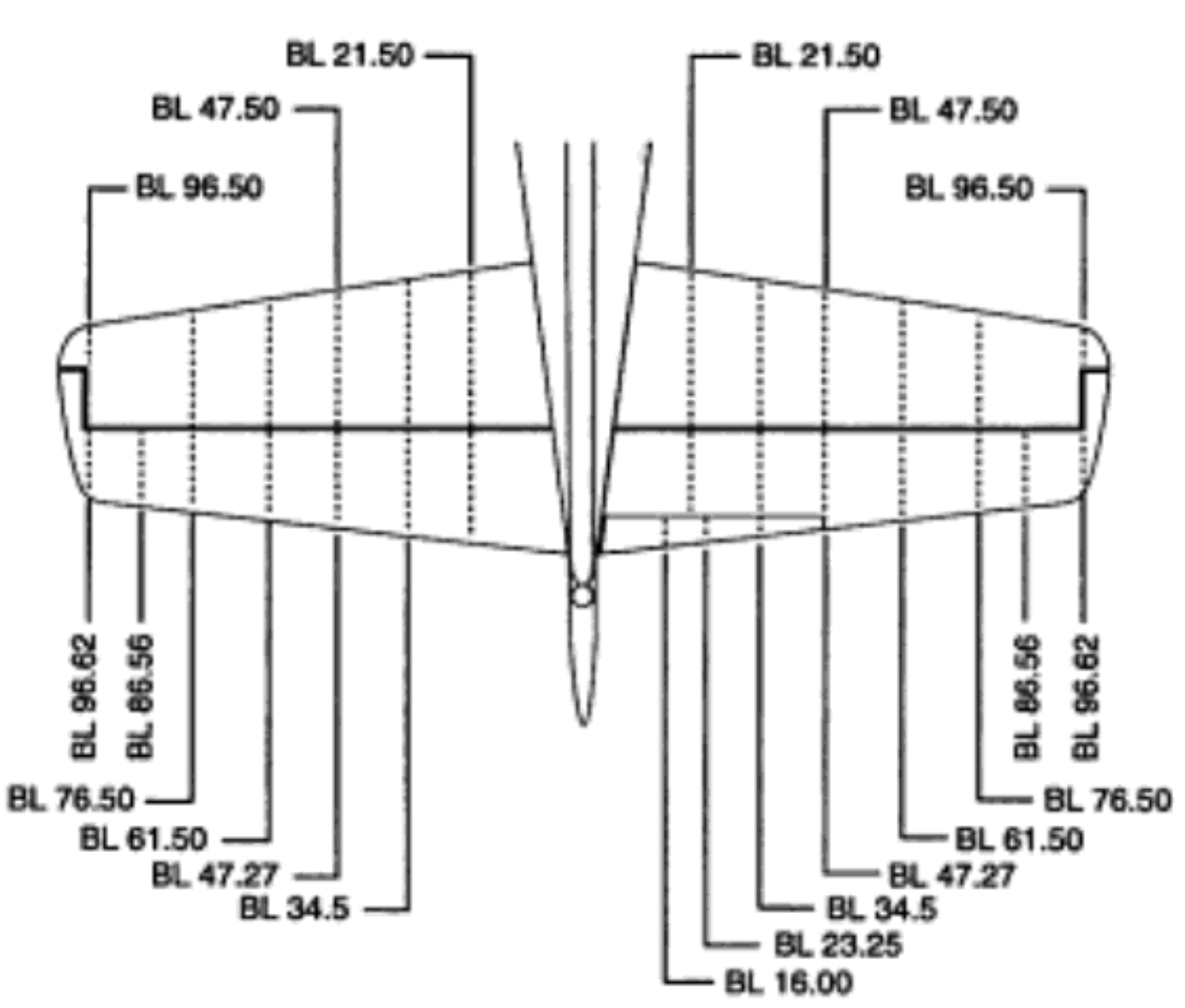
Butt lines on a scheme of a stabilizer (BL ticks are symmetrical here, usually ticks on the left are negative)

Butt line ticks increase to the right of the pilot with the origin at the centerline. When compared to the (right-handed) aeromechanics coordinate systems, the direction of the butt line is opposite to the y-axis.

== Other ==
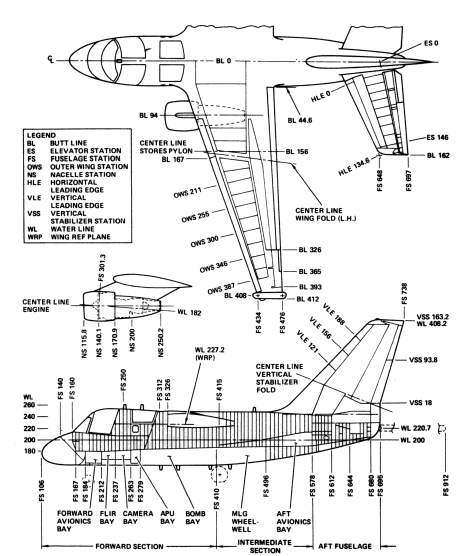
Other coordinate references on the aircraft body

Many other reference points are used, especially on a large aircraft:

- Aileron station (AS), distance from the inboard edge of an aileron;
- Flap station (KS), distance from the edge of the flap;
- Nacelle station (NS);
- Elevator station (ES);
- Vertical stabilizer station (VSS).

== Sources ==
- Takahashi, T. (2017). Aircraft Performance and Sizing, Volume I: Fundamentals of Aircraft Performance. Momentum Press. ISBN 978-1-60650-684-4.
- United States. Air Force (1960). Air Force AFM. Department of the Air Force.
- FAA (2012). Aviation Maintenance Technician Handbook-Airframe. Aviation Supplies & Academics, Incorporated. ISBN 978-1-56027-950-1.
