= Commercial Standard Digital Bus =

The Commercial Standard Digital Bus (CSDB) is a multidrop bus, formerly known as the Collins Standard Digital Bus. The maximum speed is 50 kbit/s.

Most civilian aircraft use one of 3 serial buses: the Commercial Standard Digital Bus (CSDB), ARINC 429, or AS-15531.

The Commercial Standard Digital Bus is a two-wire asynchronous broadcast data transmission bus. Data is transmitted over an interconnecting cable by devices that comply with Electronic Industries Association (EIA) RS-422A. The physical layer is EIA-422.

Messages on the CSDB consist of one address byte followed by any number of data bytes.
