= DUATS =

Service

Direct User Access Terminal Service (DUATS) was a weather information and flight plan processing service contracted by the Federal Aviation Administration (FAA) in 1989 for use by United States civil pilots and other authorized users. The DUAT Service was a telephone- and Internet-based system which allowed the pilot to use a personal computer for access to a Federal Aviation Administration (FAA) database to obtain weather and aeronautical information and to file, amend, and cancel domestic IFR and VFR flight plans. DUATS provided direct access to weather information via a National Airspace System (NAS) Data Interchange Network II (NADIN-II) interface to the Weather Message Switching Center Replacement (WMSCR) System and the Air traffic control (ATC) Facilities for filing flight plans. The pilot users could interface DUAT Services via the FTS-2001 toll free telephone numbers or via an Internet Interface into the Contractor's Facility. The service could be accessed by direct dial (using a terminal emulator like HyperTerminal), and the Internet via Telnet or HTTP.

The last DUATS service contractor was CSRA, formerly known as Computer Sciences Corporation (CSC).

Some commonly used services that DUATS provided were flight planning, flight plan filing and closing, and retrieving aviation weather, both alphanumeric and graphic, and NOTAM information, although the full list was much longer. DUATS was available free of charge to all registered U.S. pilots and student pilots who hold a current medical certificate, as well as flight instructors, ground instructors, glider and balloon pilots, and other members of the aviation community.

The FAA announced that DUATS would shut down effective May 16, 2018, recommending the 1800wxbrief.com website as an alternative. However, widespread adoption of EFB (Electronic flight bag) mobile applications has largely replaced functions provided by the service. The duats.com website is defunct, the domain name now owned by a promotional service.

== DUATS Functions ==
=== Flight Restrictions ===
DUATS could display Temporary Flight Restrictions in both textual and graphical format.

=== Weather Briefings ===
DUATS provided complete standard, outlook, or abbreviated weather briefings. These briefings were the same quality as, and could substitute for, those received from a Flight Service Station. Standard briefings are used when a flight is expected to take place within 6 hours, and include all weather and NOTAM information applicable for that flight. Outlook briefings are applicable when a flight is planned for more than 6 hours in the future, and includes expected weather conditions at that time. Abbreviated briefings could be requested when a standard briefing had already been received and a pilot only needs to know if there have been any changes or updates.

=== Weather Graphics ===
DUATS offered weather graphics including surface analyses, satellite imagery, NEXRAD radar, and forecasts up to 72 hours into the future.

=== Flight Planner ===
One of DUATS most-used features was its flight planning system. Designed for ease of use, the flight planner required only six inputs (departure airport, destination airport, cruise altitude, aircraft profile, route of aircraft, and departure time) to calculate a complete navigation log. The navigation log included:

- Route
- Forecast winds
- Temperatures
- Airspeed (ground speed and true airspeed)
- Fuel consumption
- Time en route
- Distance between checkpoints

==== Example of a simple DUATS navigation log ====
---+--------+---------+-----|                        |------
 1. Waypoint 1              |                        |      
    Waypoint location       |--------+----+---+------|      
    Latitude Longitude  Alt | Route             Fuel |      
---+--------+---------+-----| Winds   Crs  TAS  Time |------
 2. Waypoint 2              | Temp    Hdg   GS  Dist |      
    Waypoint location       |--------+----+---+------|      
    Latitude Longitude  Alt |                        |      
---+--------+---------+-----|                        |------

=== Airport Diagrams ===
Downloadable airport diagrams were available via a link from the main DUATS page.

=== Stored Aircraft Profiles ===
DUATS could store data on a particular type of airplane that the user generally flies so it could be used for flight planning purposes.

=== Flight Plan Filing ===
Once a flight plan was entered, it could be sent directly into the FAA flight plan database using DUATS. After a VFR flight was completed, DUATS could also be used to report the flight plan as closed to the FAA.

=== Stored Routes ===
A flight plan could be entered and then stored to be flown later.

=== Encode and Decode Contractions ===
DUATS could display the identifier for an airport or navaid given the name, and the name given the identifier. It could also take a standard contraction and give the plain English definition.

=== Profile ===
DUATS could also store required information about a pilot and then enter it automatically when filing a flight plan.
