= Active tip-clearance control =

Active clearance control (ACC) is a method used in aircraft gas turbine engines to improve fuel efficiency. This is achieved by actively controlling the turbine tip clearance during multiple phases of flight. Passive clearance control, on the other hand, sets the tip clearance for one operating condition, and the clearance at the other conditions results from the heating and forces on the components.

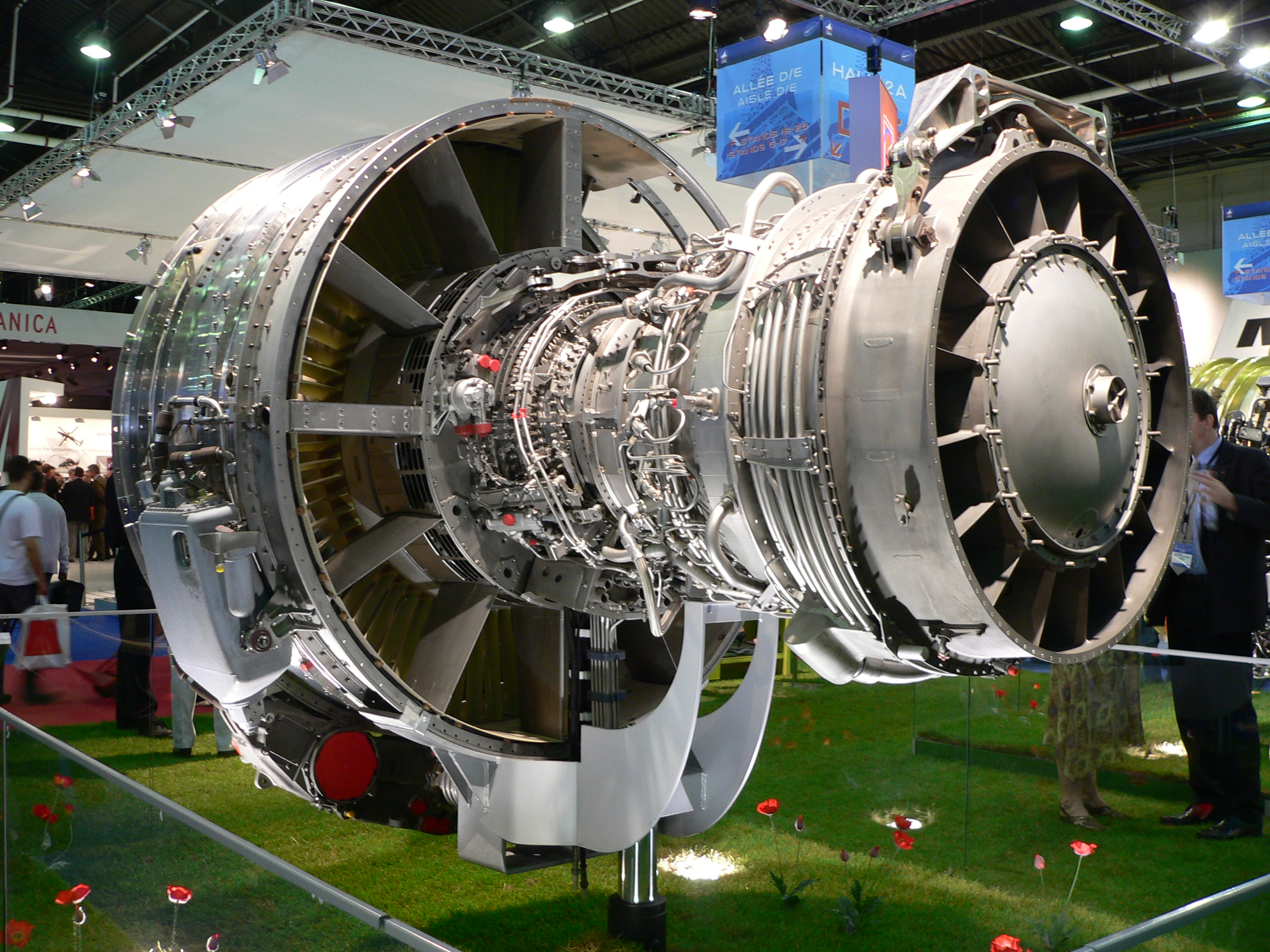
CFM International CFM56-5B engine showing turbine tip clearance control: piccolo tubes, round LPT case, and smooth outer surface of HPT case cooling manifold

ACC has been used in aircraft engine design since the late 1960s to reduce wasted energy in the engine, and increase fuel efficiency. It is used on engines such as the CFM International CFM56-5B engine, installed on the Airbus A320, and the Rolls-Royce BR700.

== Background ==
Blade tip sealing has been a challenging problem since the development of gas turbine engines. This is because the clearance between the rotating blade tips and surrounding casing varies from thermal expansion and mechanical strain of the components.

Turbine tip clearance is a leakage path for gas to flow around, and not through the turbine blades. Gas that does not flow through the turbine blades does not contribute to the power produced by the turbine. This wastes energy, and reduces fuel efficiency.

There are three main components that contribute to tip clearance: the spinning turbine disc, spinning turbine blades, and the non-moving shroud. At start-up, these are all cold and moving slowly. During warm-up, they are heating up and expanding at different rates. The turbine components deform due to centrifugal stresses as they spin, while the non-moving shroud does not. Once the engine is warmed up, all of the components are at a steady temperature, and the spinning turbine components maintain their deformation due to centrifugal forces. In none of these states is it acceptable for the turbine tips to rub on the shroud, so positive clearance must be maintained in all cases. Zero clearance is ideal for the sake of efficiency. With only passive clearance control, the tip clearance is set as low as safely possible in whatever the worst-case condition is, and then the clearance is larger in all of the other conditions. With active clearance control, the clearance can be set as low as safely possible in multiple conditions.

High pressure turbine (HPT) blade tip clearance has a significant impact on fuel burn and emissions. Using ACC gives significant benefits in cruise fuel burn, range, and payload capability for aircraft.

== Basic system overview ==
As an example the CFM International CFM56-5A engine active clearance control uses HPC air for the HPTACC and fan bypass air for the LPTACC. Clearance control is managed by the engine FADEC which consists of an electronic control unit (ECU), an hydromechanical unit (HMU) and HP and LP ACC valves.
