= Aeronautical Information Manual =

Official guide to basic aviation info in the US and Canada

In United States and Canadian aviation, the Aeronautical Information Manual (AIM) (formerly the Airman's Information Manual) is the respective nation's official guide to basic flight information and air traffic control procedures.

These manuals contain the fundamentals required in order to fly legally in the country of origin. They also contain items of interest to pilots concerning health and medical facts, factors affecting flight safety, a pilot/controller glossary of terms used in the ATC System, and information on safety, accident, and hazard reporting. Although the AIMs are not regulatory in nature, parts of them restate and amplify federal regulations.

== United States ==
In the United States, the AIM is published by the Federal Aviation Administration, and contains eleven chapters, as follows:

1. Air Navigation
2. Aeronautical Lighting and Other Airport Visual Aids
3. Airspace
4. Air Traffic Control
5. Air Traffic Procedures
6. Emergency Procedures
7. Safety of Flight
8. Medical Facts for Pilots
9. Aeronautical Charts and Related Publications
10. Helicopter Operations
11. Unmanned Aircraft Systems (UAS)

The AIM's text and images are produced by the FAA, and are available in electronic form. Several commercial enterprises sell typeset books containing the AIM, usually in combination with those chapters of the Federal regulations that are particularly important to pilots. The books are usually called "FAR/AIM".

== Canada ==
In Canada, the AIM is published by Transport Canada, and contains the following chapters:

1. General (GEN)
2. Aerodromes (AGA)
3. Communications (COM)
4. Meteorology (MET)
5. Rules of the Air and Air Traffic Services (RAC)
6. North Atlantic Operations (NAT)
7. Search and Rescue (SAR)
8. Aeronautical Charts and Publications (MAP)
9. Licensing, Registration and Airworthiness (LRA)
10. Airmanship (AIR)
11. Remotely Piloted Aircraft (RPA)

New editions of the AIM are published twice a year, usually in April and October.
