= Quick Reference Handbook =

Aircraft technical document

A quick reference handbook (QRH) is a quick-access manual for aircraft pilots that contains all the procedures applicable for non-normal and emergency conditions in an easy-to-use format. Performance data corrections are also provided for specific conditions. A QRH is kept in the cockpit and can be consulted whenever the flight crew experiences in-flight problems.

== Format ==
The first QRHs in the 20th century were made out of paper, but in the 21st century, many pilots have switched to so-called electronic flight bags (EFB), which have the advantage of electronic search functions, but require electricity to work. Some modern aircraft such as the Airbus A350, and Airbus A380, have computerised some of the checklists with their own integrated EFB. However, pilots still are required to have their own EFB as an added redundency as not all procedures and use cases will display the correct checklists, due to some problems being unable to be correctly identified or diagnosed by the onboard aircraft computers. Thus, the quick reference handbook remains an essential in-flight tool for the crew.

== Contents ==
QRH includes various checklists for dealing with abnormal and emergency situations, based on the equipment and furnishings on the airplane. The aircraft manufacturer-designated checklists are always included in a QRH, and often the airline company or operator will include its own procedures. Therefore, there is no single universal QRH and they may differ widely in contents, but in practice, individual versions of it are referred to as the quick reference handbook. When designed and used correctly to address issues such as turbine engine failures or on-board fires, a QRH can prevent aviation accidents and incidents.

QRH have to include time-critical information and frequently used information for the flight crew.

One example of a checklist in a QRH is the Engine Failure/Fire – Severe Damage or Separation checklist. Another example is the Cabin Altitude Warning or Rapid Depressurization checklist.

== See also ==
- Index of aviation articles
- Lists of aviation topics
- Aircraft flight manual
- Electronic flight bag
- Preflight checklist
