= Flight bag =

Document bag carried by pilots and flight crews

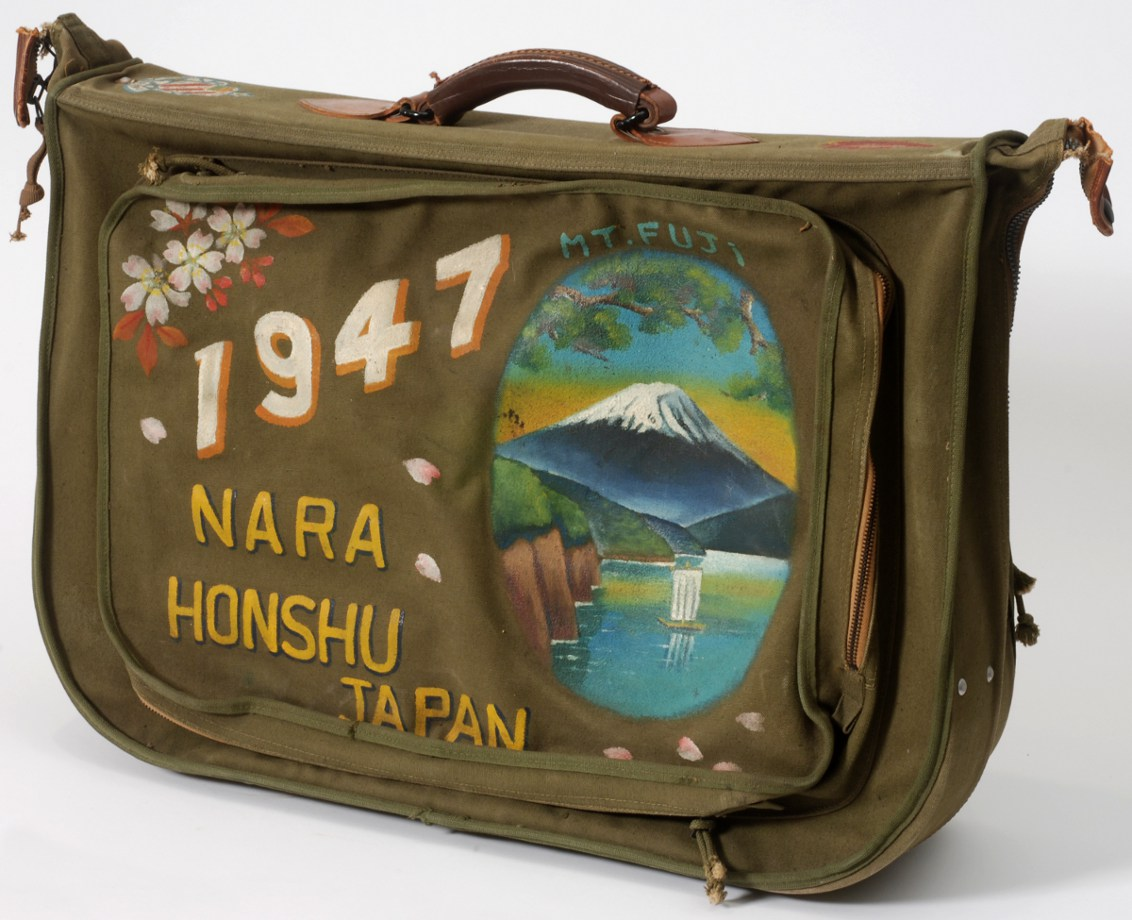
A painted B-4 flight bag

A flight bag can be any baggage taken on board a flight, but is usually a specific type of document bag carried by pilots and flight crews. Often adorned with an airline logo, at one time the flight bag was a chic fashion accessory.

== Use ==
Items commonly found in pilots' flight bags include operating manuals for the aircraft being flown, operations manuals for the flight crew, aeronautical and navigational charts (usually Jeppesen chart binders or "Jepps", a route manual, preflight checklist, flight checklists, logbooks and weather information), pilot's documentation and licenses (such as their passport, pilot's license, Aviation English license, class-specific medical certificate), and equipment or accessories (such as a calculator, pens, sunglasses, radio headphones or binoculars).

== Upgrade ==
Recent advances in technology and miniaturization have seen the development and deployment of electronic flight bags (EFBs), which contain electronic manuals and documents, as well as automated calculation and navigation tools. According to United Airlines, a conventional paper-based flight bag contains an average of 12,000 sheets of paper per pilot. The airline estimated that deployment of an EFB system running on Apple iPads would save the airline nearly 16 million sheets of paper a year, as well as saving 1,230,000 litres (326,000 US gal) of jet fuel due to the reduced weight on board the aircraft.

== See also ==
- Pilot's kneeboard
