= AlertHouston =

Public alert system

AlertHouston is the City of Houston’s official source for information about emergency events, current conditions, expected impacts, important City services, and actions that residents can take to keep themselves safe. Registration is free and alerts are available through text message, voice call, or email. Users can also sign up for push notifications through the Everbridge app. In 2018, it was announced that the system would be improved through geo-targeting. As of May 2023, less than 9% of Houston residents had signed up for alerts.

== Notifications ==
Users are able to subscribe to various types of notifications via text message, mobile application, email, or voice call.

- CitizensNet
- Emergency Incidents
- Severe Weather alerts
- Major Traffic & Transit Disruptions
- Missing Persons
- Special Events & Planned Drills
- Recovery updates

Some alerts are geo-tagged and users are able to sign up for multiple addresses to track emergencies at various locations such as work, home, and residences of family members.

== Accessibility ==
Upon registration, users are able to indicate their preferred language from the following choices:

- Arabic
- Simplified Chinese
- English
- French
- Spanish
- Vietnamese

Houston's Office of Emergency Management sends messages in English and Spanish. In 2024, residents and members of the nonprofit organization Woori Juntos demanded that the sign up process for alerts become more accessible. 145 languages are spoken in Houston according to the Census. Although alerts are available in multiple languages, the barriers that exist in signing up for alerts exclude many non-English speaking residents.
