= Grease pencil =

Writing tool with a core of coloured wax

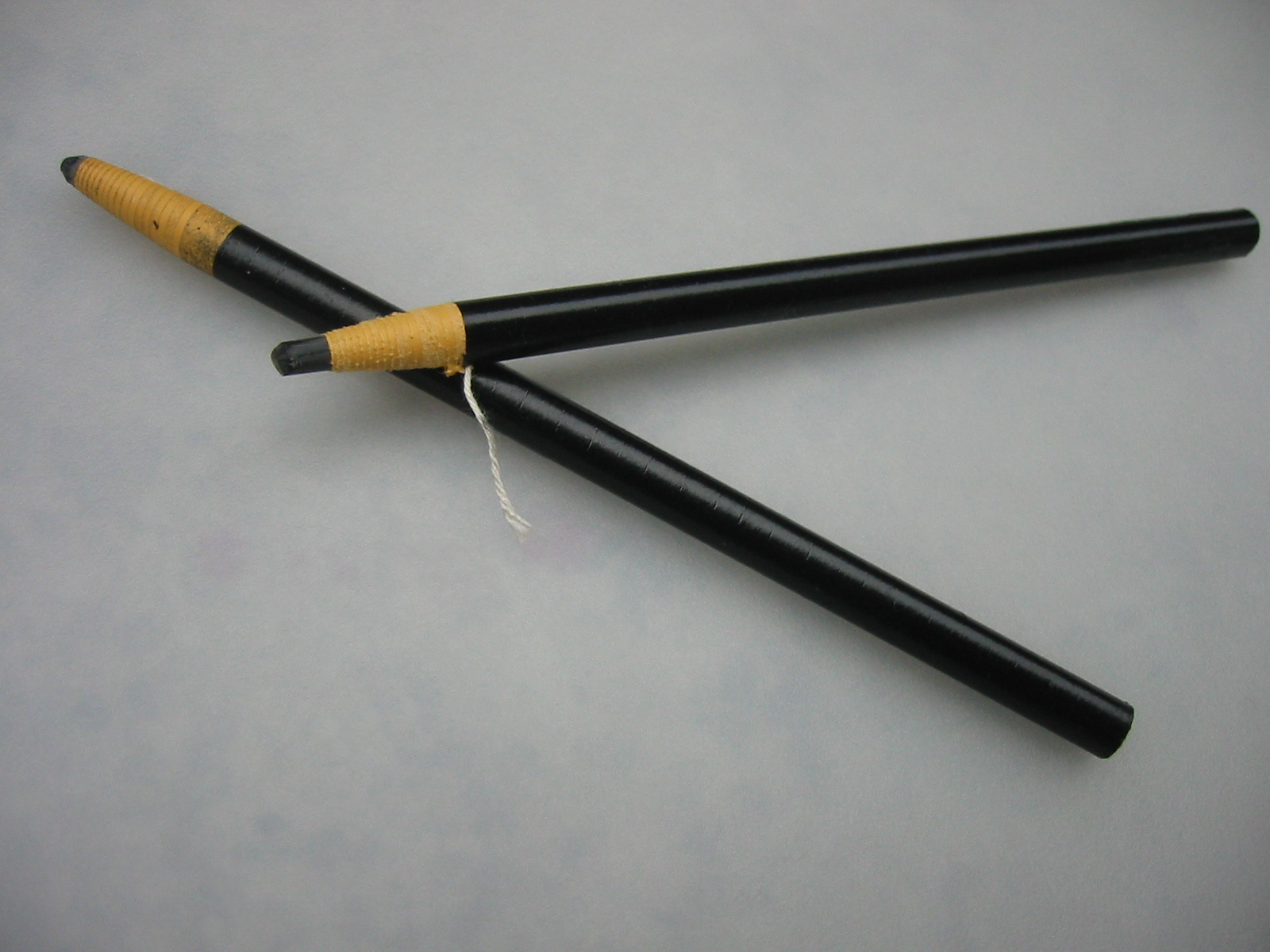
Two grease pencils

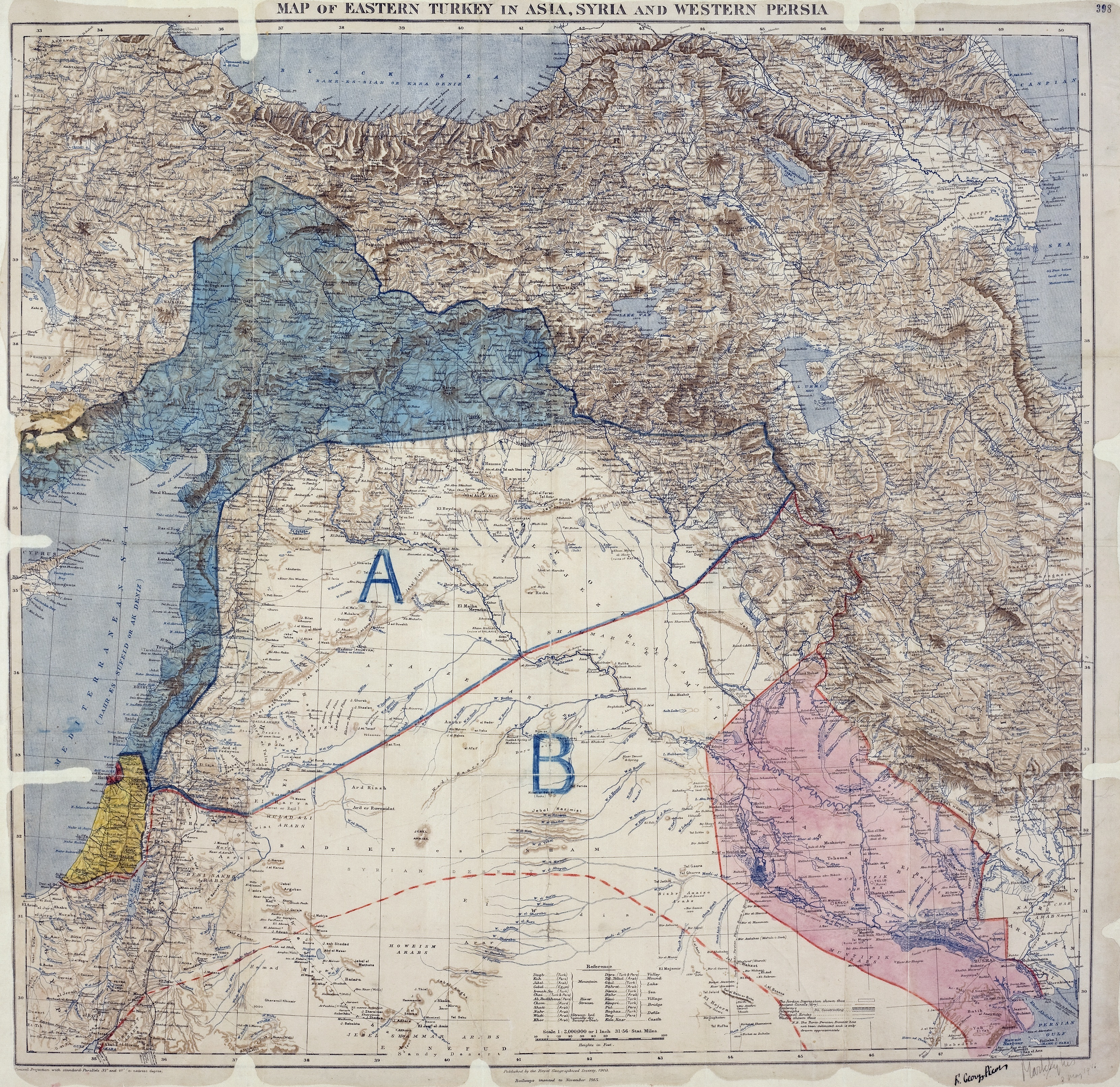
Historical diplomatic usage

The grease pencil, a wax writing tool also known as a wax pencil, china marker, or chinagraph pencil (especially in the United Kingdom), is a writing implement made of hardened colored wax and is useful for marking on hard, glossy non-porous surfaces. This pencil is usually made from non-toxic opaque wax (such as paraffin, beeswax, ceresin, carnauba, or spermaceti wax) that is similar to a crayon but stronger. Marks made by grease pencils are resistant to moisture and can usually be removed by rubbing the marked surface with a paper towel.

Grease pencils are available in several forms. The outer casing may be made of wood (like an ordinary pencil) and sharpened with a knife or pencil sharpener. Other types are covered in paper and sharpened by pulling a string to peel off the paper, needing no additional tools to remain functional. More recently, it has been produced in propelling form, essentially similar to a mechanical pencil, this type in particular being associated with knee boards employed by NATO aircrew.

Surfaces used with grease pencils include glass, rock, polished stone, plastic, ceramics, acetate, and other glazed, lacquered or polished surfaces, and metal, as well as the glossy paper that is used for photographic printing (particularly for contact sheets), x-rays, maps, and for marking edits on analog audio tape and film. It is also used to label theatrical lighting gels. It is often used as a construction or handyman's marking tool as it rarely scratches the surface it is used on. It may be used to mark a wet surface. They are also favored among some traditional artists. They were also used to mark glassware, during production (the original Chinagraph is so-named for marking porcelain during manufacture) and in medical or scientific applications.

Grease pencils were also widely used during the mid-20th century in aircraft control centers, military radar defense system stations on land and in aircraft carriers in particular. As information came in from radar and radio operators, technicians would take details of aircraft locations, vectors, weapons and fuel status and other information and write it in reverse on a large, clear panel of glass, which was readable to the officers on the other side of the panel. Such a transparent plotting board is portrayed in the early seasons of Stargate SG-1’s title sequence scene in the base of a galaxy-faring branch of the United States Air Force. The information could be continuously updated as the situation changed. They have largely been replaced by digital displays in the modern era.

In the days when broadcast studios had a library of LP records, a track which was prohibited from public performance could be defaced by a wavy white or yellow chinagraph line, giving a visible warning to the presenter as well as making that track unusable.

Grease pencils are also commonly used by fire brigades in the United Kingdom. Entry Control Officers who monitor firefighters wearing SCBA use them to write information such as their location on a control board.
