= Boeing UK =

Aerospace operation in the United Kingdom and Ireland

Boeing United Kingdom Ltd.

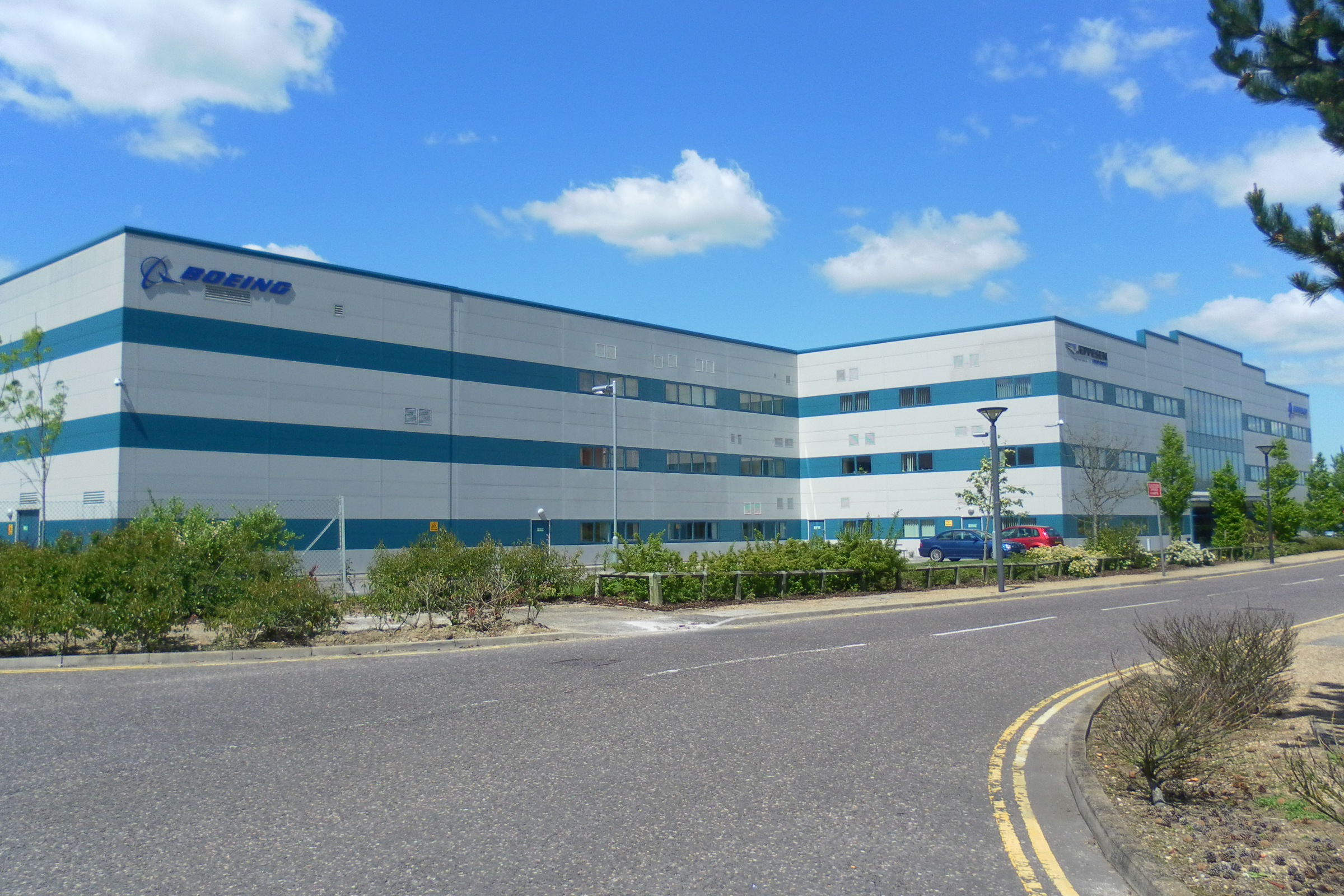
- Boeing Flight Services in Crawley
- Type: Subsidiary
- Industry: Aerospace
- Founded: 17 January 2002; 24 years ago
- Headquarters: London, England, UK
- Area served: United Kingdom, Ireland
- Key people: Martin Donnelly (managing director)
- Services: Support solutions; Flight simulators; Aircraft maintenance; IT services; Aircraft parts production
- Number of employees: ~2,500 (15 April 2019)
- Parent: Boeing
- Divisions: Boeing Sheffield; Boeing Commercial Aviation Services Europe; Boeing Flight Services; Boeing Technical Services
- Website: www.boeing.co.uk

Boeing United Kingdom Limited (/ˈboʊ.ɪŋ/; or simply Boeing UK) is a subsidiary of Boeing that operates in the United Kingdom and Ireland.

The managing director of Boeing UK & Ireland is Sir Martin Donnelly, a former British civil servant, who is also president of Boeing Europe. Donnelly succeeded Sir Michael Arthur who had been in the roles since 2014 after he was appointed president of Boeing International. Boeing UK has approximately 2,500 employees accounting for 54% of Boeing’s European workforce. The company operates in more than 65 locations across the United Kingdom and Ireland including Bristol, Fleet, Frimley, Farnborough, Gosport, Yeovil, Salisbury and Manchester, with its primary headquarters located in Westminster.

Boeing UK engages in educational projects related to aerospace, working alongside charity partners such as the Royal Aeronautical Society, The Air League and Royal Air Force. Outside of aerospace, Boeing UK has supported charities such as the Earth Restoration Service, The Prince's Trust and the Royal Academy of Engineering, funding environmental programmes and STEM-based projects. Boeing UK has more than 200 UK suppliers and strategic partnerships with six universities.

== History ==
=== 1930s to 1940s ===
In June 1939, Pan American Airways (Pan Am) introduced its first transatlantic northern mail service, using a Boeing 314 that would deliver mail from New York to Southampton in the UK. That same month, Pan Am also announced that it was using another Boeing 314 for its first regular passenger air service.

Boeing increased its cooperation with the British Government in 1941 by supplying three Boeing 314A aircraft which were allotted to The British Overseas Airways Corporation (BOAC) for use as transport aircraft. Winston Churchill was the first world leader to make a transatlantic air trip aboard BOAC's Boeing 314 "Berwick" in 1942. The Eighth Air Force, formed in the US in 1941, was equipped with Boeing B-17 Flying Fortress' which participated in bombing raids on German targets in Europe while based in England. Boeing built 380 of the Douglas-designed A-20 Havoc, an aircraft that served under the Royal Air Force during World War II.

=== 1980s to 1990s ===
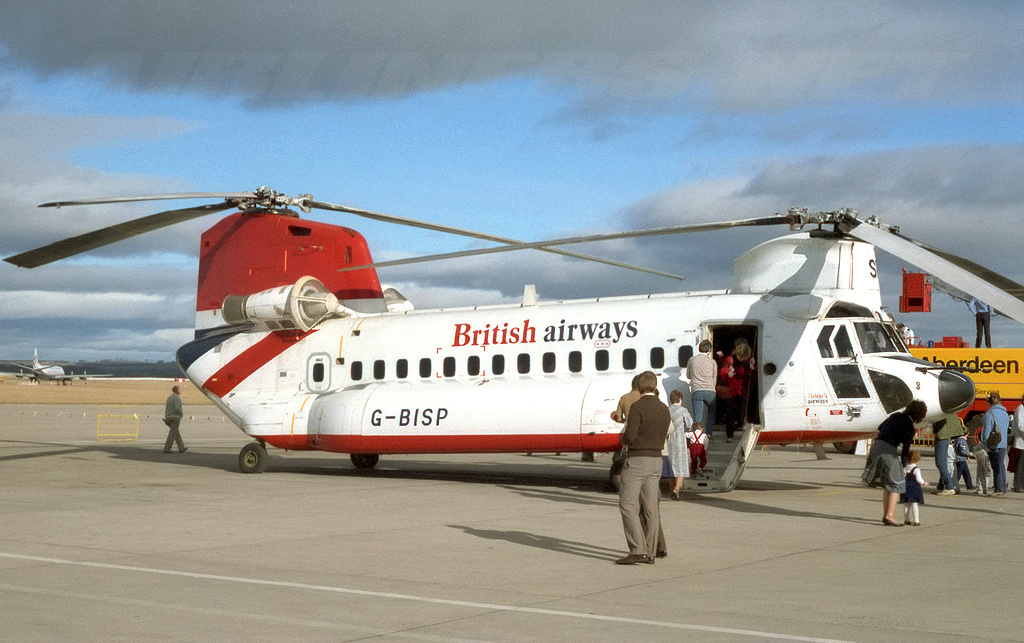
British Airways Helicopters' Vertol 234LR G-BISP at Aberdeen Airport, 1985.

After World War II, Boeing's business relationship with the UK did not begin again until the 1980s, with the exception of BOAC introducing the Boeing 707-436 to its aircraft line-up in 1960. The now defunct British Airways Helicopters bought six Vertol 234 Commercial Chinooks in 1981, providing services to offshore gas and oil platforms until the company was sold by British Airways in 1986. Rolls-Royce began testing and developing the RB211-534E4 turbofan engine in 1983 and was the engine used on the Boeing 757, generating over 40,000+ hours of on-wing life without removal. In 1988, Air United Kingdom became the first airline to operate the Boeing 737-400 outside of the US and later used the Boeing 767-300 ER series in 1993 for its subsidiary, Air UK Leisure.

=== 2000s to 2010 ===
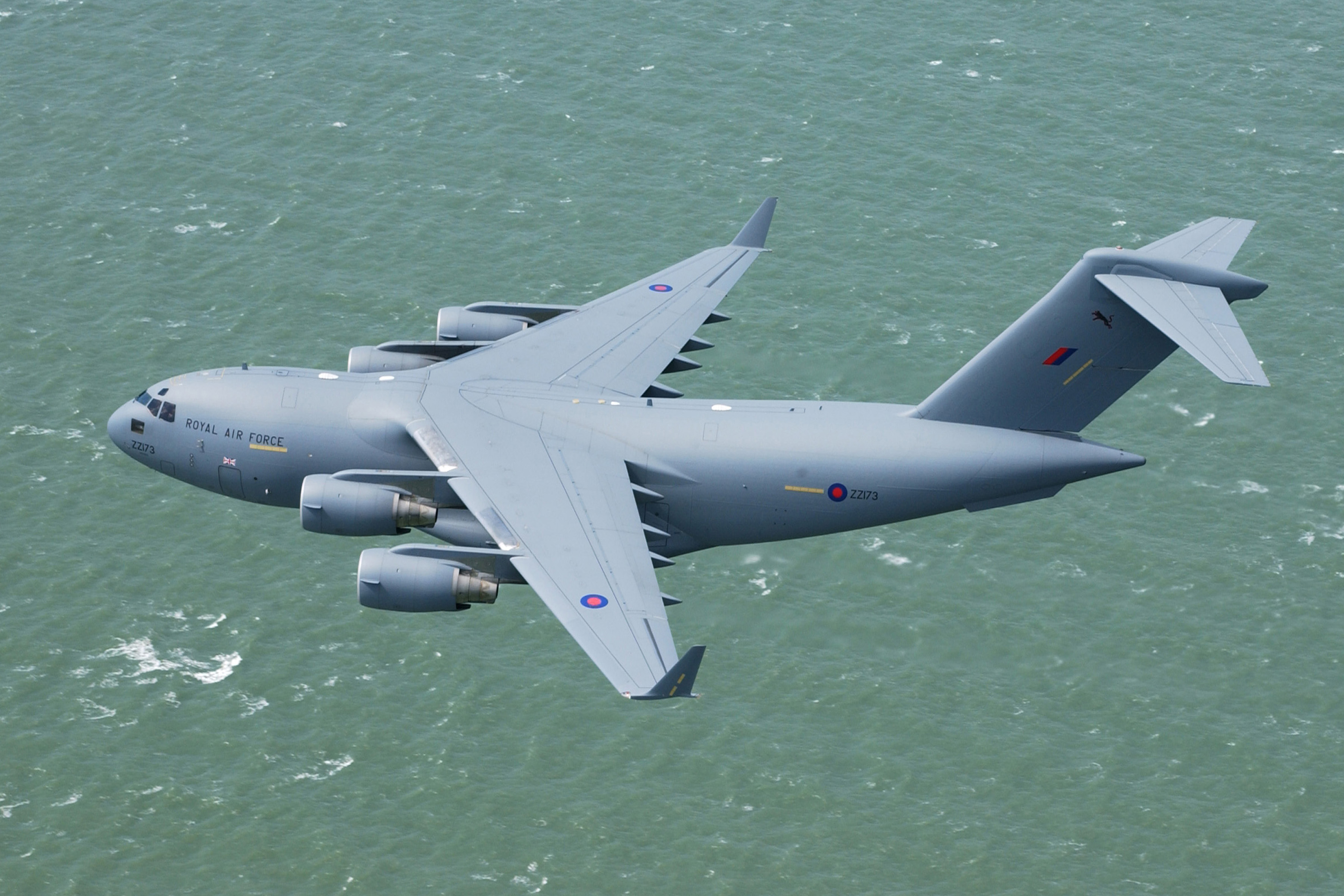
A C-17 Transport aircraft of No. 99 Squadron at RAF Brize Norton.

In 2001, the Royal Air Force received its first Boeing C-17 Globemaster III. It was delivered to Boeing's Long Beach facility before being flown to RAF Brize Norton by a crew from No. 99 Squadron, with the remaining C-17s being delivered shortly after. The C-17 was well received by the RAF and the Ministry of Defence (MOD) announced in 2004 that they had intended to buy the four C-17s at the end of the lease. Boeing received further orders from the MOD in 2006, 2007 and 2009.

Boeing founded Boeing United Kingdom Limited as a legal entity in January 2002 and in April 2003 Boeing named Sir Michael Jenkins as the first president of Boeing UK.

In 2004, Boeing began to expand its presence in the UK by announcing its £7 million investment to build a new training centre at Crawley, West Sussex, close to London Gatwick. The move was to allow more convenient travel for those who required training in Europe, instead of travelling to Seattle, U.S. In September 2005, Sir Roger Bone succeeded Michael Jenkins as president of Boeing UK. Boeing opened its European Sales and Marketing Headquarters at Heathrow House, moving further operations from the U.S. to the UK. In 2007, Boeing opened its Defence Systems Engineering and Integration facility in Bristol and in 2009 integrated all UK defence programs under one entity by establishing Boeing Defence UK (BDUK). This enabled defence operations in the UK to be localised and more efficient.

=== 2010 to present ===
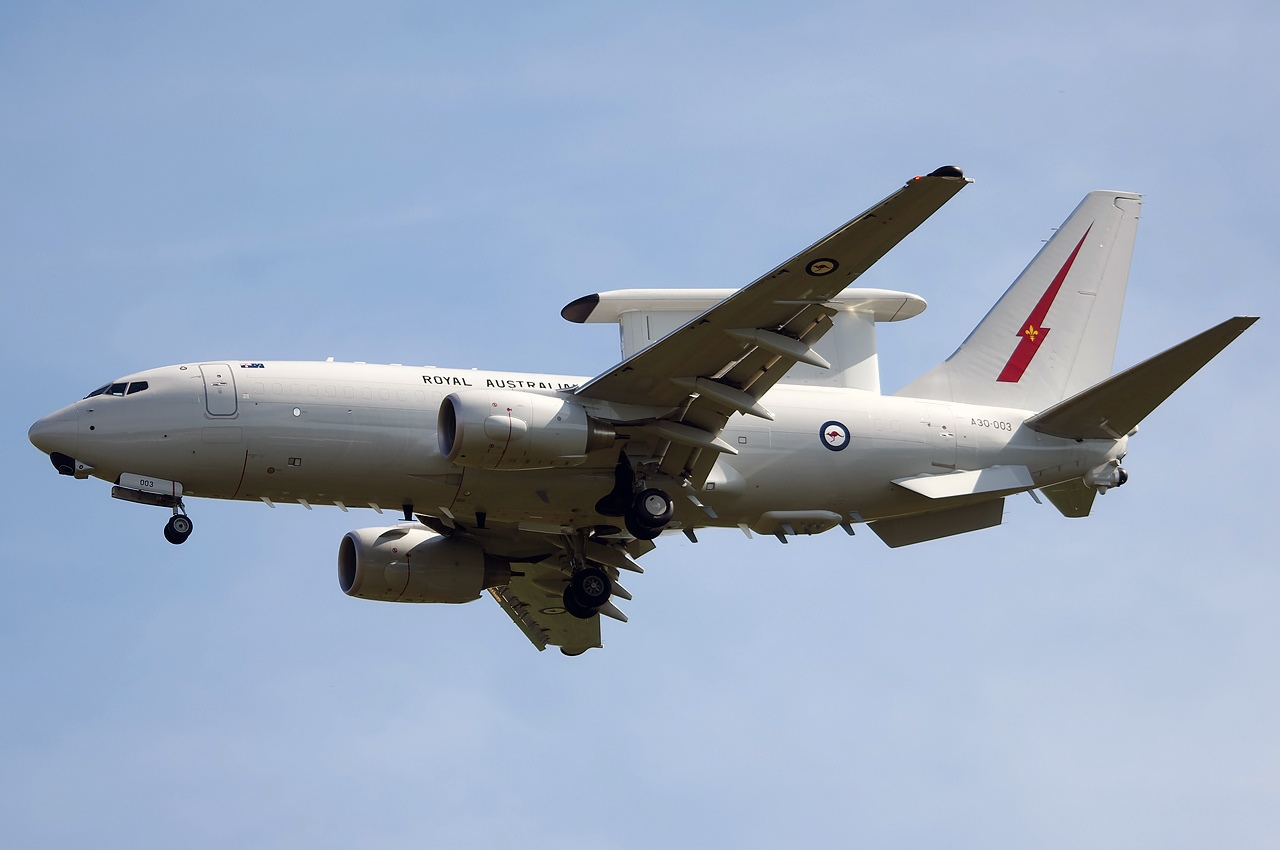
A Boeing E-7A Wedgetail of the Royal Australian Air Force. The UK ordered 5 of the aircraft in 2019 which will replace the Boeing E-3D Sentry which have been in service with the RAF since 1991.

In September 2014, Roger Bone retired as president of Boeing UK and was succeeded by Michael Arthur.

At the Farnborough Airshow in 2016, the UK government and Boeing announced a partnering initiative to advance growth and prosperity in the United Kingdom. The initiative required Boeing to increase overall bid opportunities offered to UK suppliers; make the UK its European base for training, maintenance, repair and overhaul across its defence fixed-wing and rotary platforms; and sign the Aerospace Growth Partnership Supply Chain Competitiveness Charter. In 2018, building on the partnering initiative, Boeing founded the Office of UK Industrial Capability (OUKIC), an enterprise team composed of representatives from St. Louis and the UK that promotes UK innovation and supply chain competitiveness around the world. Based in Seattle, United States, the OUKIC helps British companies increase bid opportunities across defence and commercial aerospace. The OUKIC is supported by a Steering Committee of senior leaders from across the British Government and Boeing.

In 2017 Boeing received planning permission to build a new hangar at London Gatwick, an investment of £88 million. Boeing UK opened its first European manufacturing site in 2018 in Sheffield, producing commercial aircraft components for its 737 and 767 aircraft.

HorizonX, Boeing's venture capital arm which invests in start-ups related to aerospace, made its first investment in the UK to Reaction Engines in April 2018, a hypersonic propulsion company developing a hybrid jet and rocket engine. In March 2019, HorizonX invested $14 million in London-based start-up Isotropic Systems, alongside granting the company access to Boeing experts, test labs, and other resources. The company develops modular antenna systems for satellite communications and its user terminals use electronics instead of mechanical dishes to link with satellites, enabling communications with two or more spacecraft simultaneously.

In March 2019, Boeing was selected to provide five Boeing 737 AEW&C to the Royal Air Force, replacing the Boeing E-3 Sentry aircraft currently in service

Michael Arthur succeeds Marc Allen as president of Boeing International in April 2019, becoming the first non-U.S. citizen to join the company's executive council. In June, Sir Martin Donnelly is appointed the new managing director of Boeing UK & Ireland and president of Boeing Europe.

== Boeing Defence UK ==
Boeing Defence UK
- Type: Subsidiary
- Industry: Defense
- Founded: 13 December 1976; 49 years ago
- Headquarters: Westminster, London, United Kingdom
- Area served: Great Britain, Northern Ireland
- Key people: Thomas Breckenridge (Managing Director)
- Products: C-17, P-8A, E-7; AH-64 Apache; CH-47 Chinook; E-3 Sentry
- Services: Leasing; Support solutions
- Number of employees: 1,400
- Parent: Boeing
- Divisions: Support Chain Information Services; Government Services; Training Services; Advanced Group UK

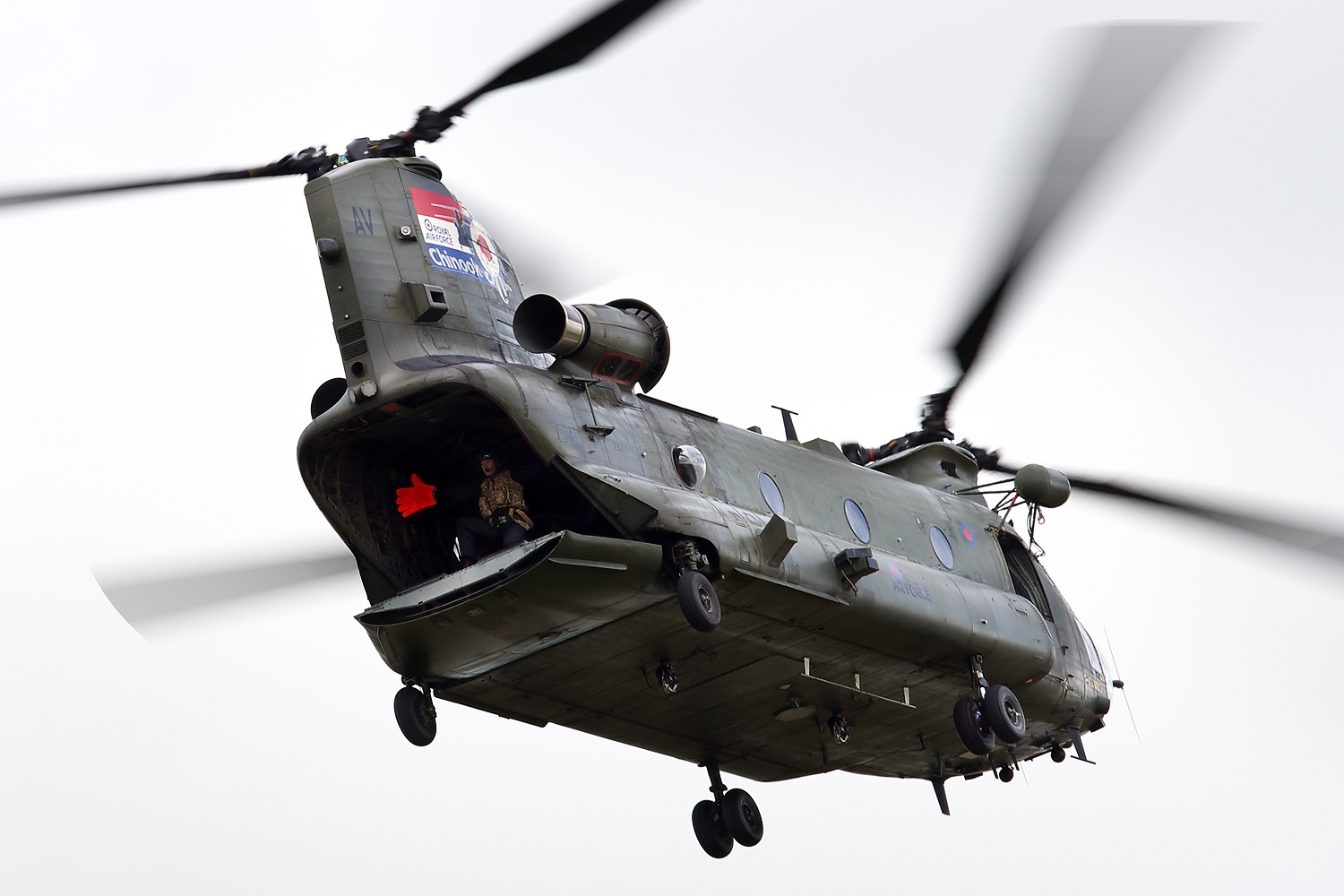
A Royal Air Force Chinook helicopter in Fairford, Gloucestershire, 2012.

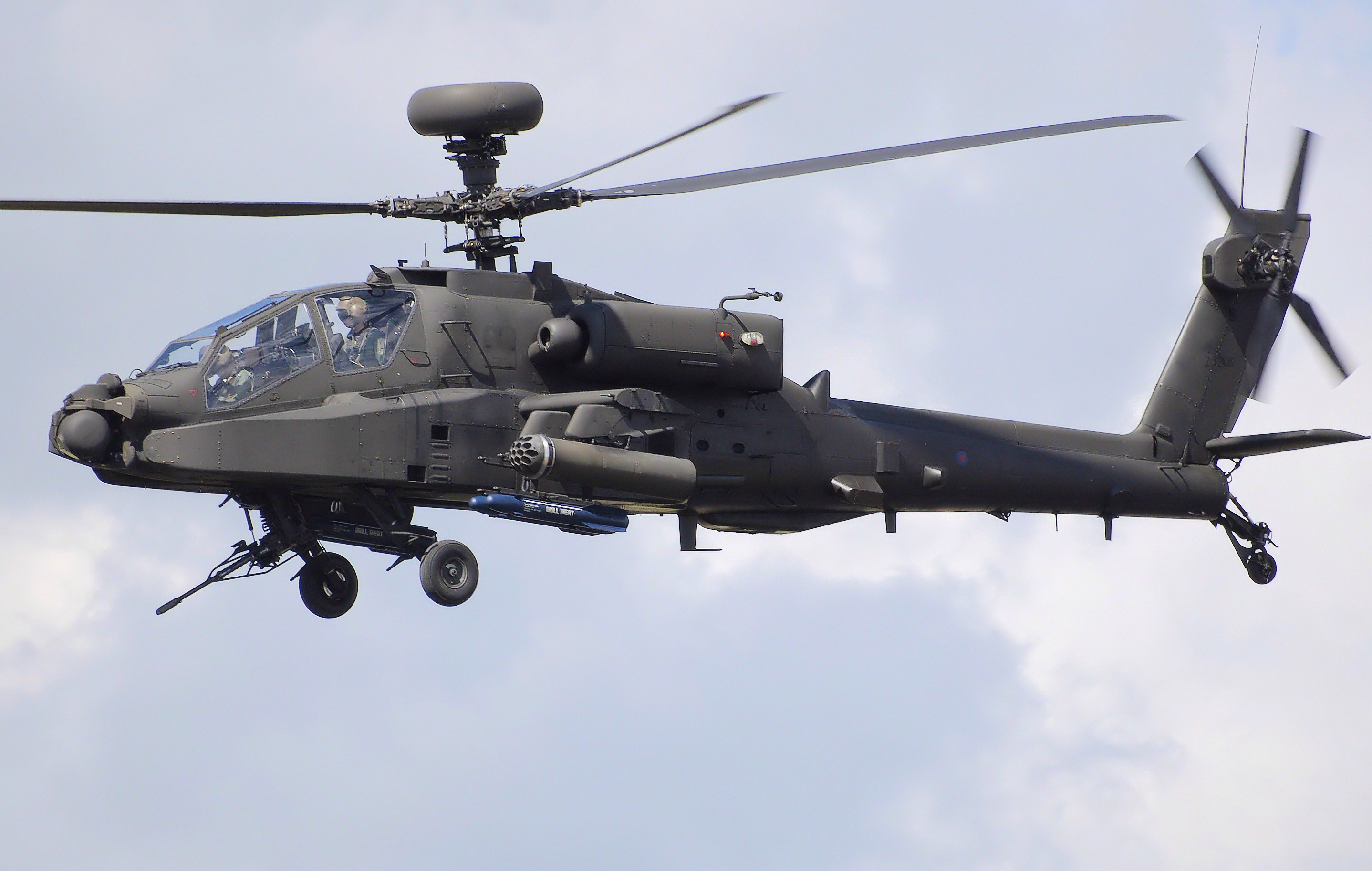
UK Army Air Corps Westland WAH-64D Apache Longbow displays at a UK airshow.

Boeing Defence UK (BDUK) is a subsidiary of Boeing that provides maintenance, support and training services. It has more than 1,400 employees at 25 locations supporting Ministry of Defence (MOD) programmes such as Apache attack helicopters, Chinook, C-17 and P-8A. Since 2019, Anna Keeling serves as the current managing director of BDUK. BDUK consists of four business units: MOD Services, training, government services and advanced programmes.

=== History ===
Boeing Defence UK (BDUK) was established in 1976 as a legal entity to localise the company's defence programmes and in 2008 Boeing fully integrated all of its defence programmes into BDUK.

Michael Kurth was named the first managing director of BDUK in 2007 upon the integration of Boeing's defence programmes and the restructuring of BDUK as a subsidiary.

In 2009, the company announced the establishment of UK Rotorcraft Support (RCS), an organisation focused on providing increased capability to the UK military rotorcraft fleet. RCS provides support for the UK’s fleet of 60+ Chinook helicopters with the Through Life Customer Support (TLCS), Digital Automatic Flight Control System (DAFCS) and Chinook Engine Support Arrangement (CESA).

In partnership with the American manufacturing company John Deere, BDUK developed the R-Gator A3 Assisted Carriage System (ACS) in 2011. The R-Gator A3 ACS is based on John Deere’s R-Gator robotic utility vehicle and was designed to help reduce the amount of weight soldiers have to carry in the field.

BDUK was the first company to sign up to the MOD new Defence and Security Industrial Engagement Policy in 2012, a policy encouraging overseas-based companies to make a firm commitment to continue business activities in the United Kingdom for the long term.

In 2013, the MOD contracted BDUK and Boeing's subsidiary Insitu for the supply of the ScanEagle unmanned aerial system as a maritime intelligence, surveillance and reconnaissance (ISR) asset. It was the first drone to be used by the Royal Navy and the contract was worth £30 million.

In April 2016 BDUK was awarded a contract to become strategic IT partner to Staffordshire Police. BDUK provided the sound effects of the interior helicopter cabin for the Virtual Reality Chinook project that was created to help train medical personnel of the UK Armed Forces in June 2016. The same year, BDUK was given a Gold Award by Sir Michael Fallon in recognition of supporting Armed Forces personnel and their families under the Employer Recognition Scheme (ERS). Boeing was awarded a contract for the purchase of 50 Apache AH-64Es in 2016.

== Boeing Global Services ==
BGS focuses on the company's commercial, defence and space customers and provides support to airlines across the world.

=== Boeing Commercial Aviation Services Europe ===
Boeing Commercial Aviation Services Europe (/biːˈkɑːsəl/; BCASEL) was established in January 2016, functioning as a support service to airline customers in the UK, Europe and countries worldwide who use Boeing's products or aircraft. The unit is located in Frimley, Surrey.

=== Boeing Flight Services ===
Boeing Flight Services (officially Boeing UK Training and Flight Services Limited) is a facility in Crawley near London Gatwick allowing pilots and technicians from airlines in Europe, Africa, and the Middle East to receive flight training. In 2018, Boeing invested £20 million in a new training facility on the Crawley campus providing four additional flight simulators. The move brought the total number of flight simulators at Manor House to 11, making the Boeing campus in Crawley the largest outside of the US. The flight simulators provide training to a range of Boeing aircraft including the 737 and the 787, while the Burgess Hill campus offers training for the 717 and 757-200.

=== Subsidiaries ===
Boeing UK has subsidiaries that operate in the United Kingdom offering services from flight planning software to attack helicopter training.

- Jeppesen UK - offers navigational information, operations planning tools and flight planning products and software.
- Continental Datagraphics (CDG) - provides technical lifecycle services, technical publications and software solutions.
- Aviall UK - provider of aftermarket supply-chain management services for the aerospace and defense industries.
- Aviation Training International Limited (ATIL) - provides air crew, ground crew and maintenance training to the UK Army Air Corps Apache.
- Tapestry Solutions - global provider of information management software and services for defence, government and commercial customers.
- AerData - offers integrated software solutions for lease management, engine fleet planning and records scanning.

== Main UK sites ==
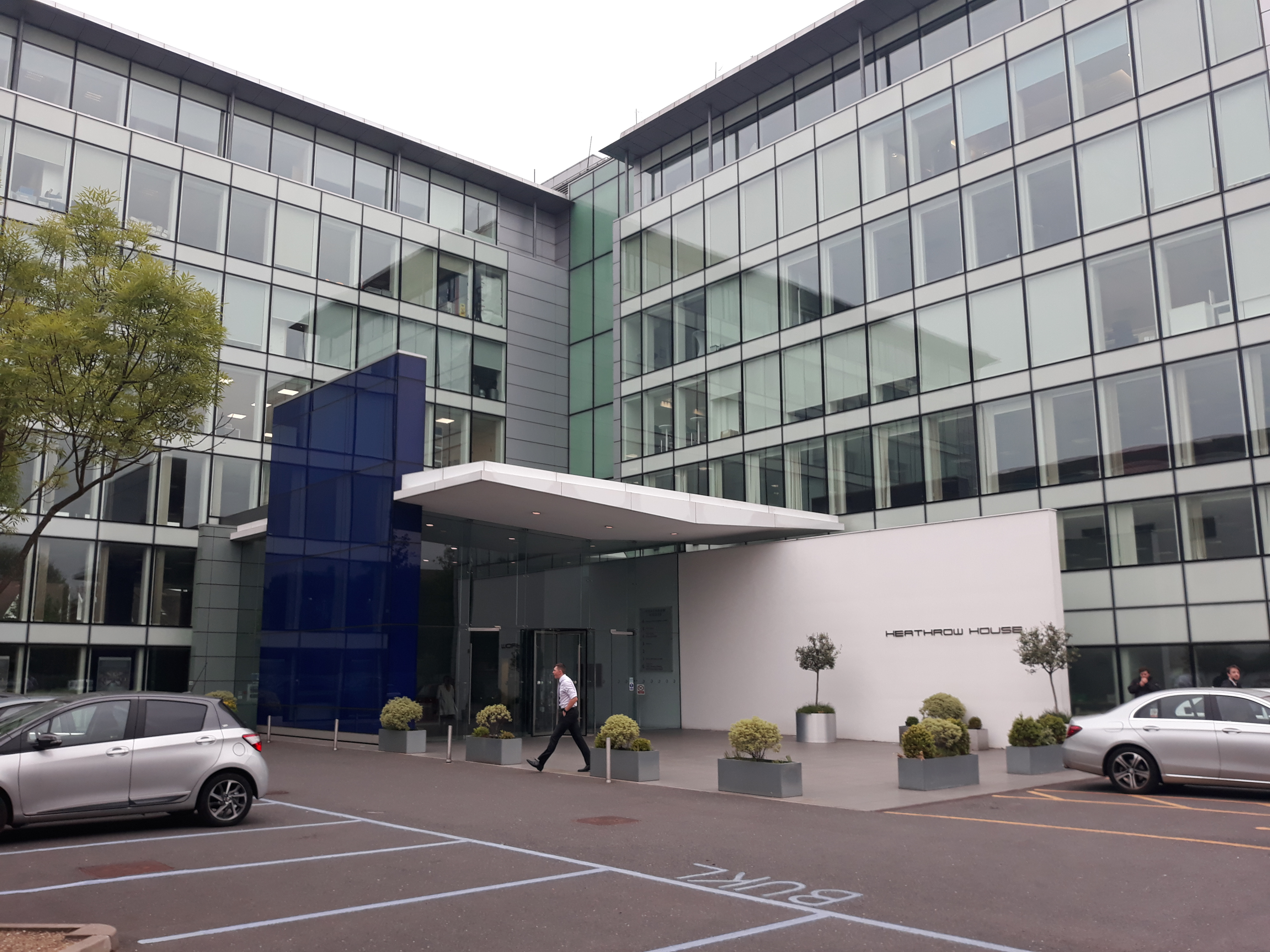
A Boeing office is located on one of the floors at this site in Hounslow near Heathrow Airport.

The company has 65 sites across the UK and Ireland.

Westminster

The site in Westminster is the registered office address of: Boeing UK, Boeing Defence UK, Boeing Commercial Aviation Services Europe, Boeing Distribution Services, Boeing UK Holdings, Boeing European Holdings and Boeing Operations International.

Sheffield

Known as 'Boeing Sheffield', the site is a manufacturing facility built in October 2018 near the Advanced Manufacturing Research Centre (AMRC). The facility is the first manufacturing site outside of the United States and it produces more than 100 different high-tech actuation system components for the 737 and 767 which are then sent back to the US for fitting. Actuation components are used on the trailing edge of the wings which extend and retract to deliver additional lift on take-off and, when landing, to slow the plane during its descent. The facility cost £40 million and 52 staff work in the 66,736 sq ft factory.

Lossiemouth

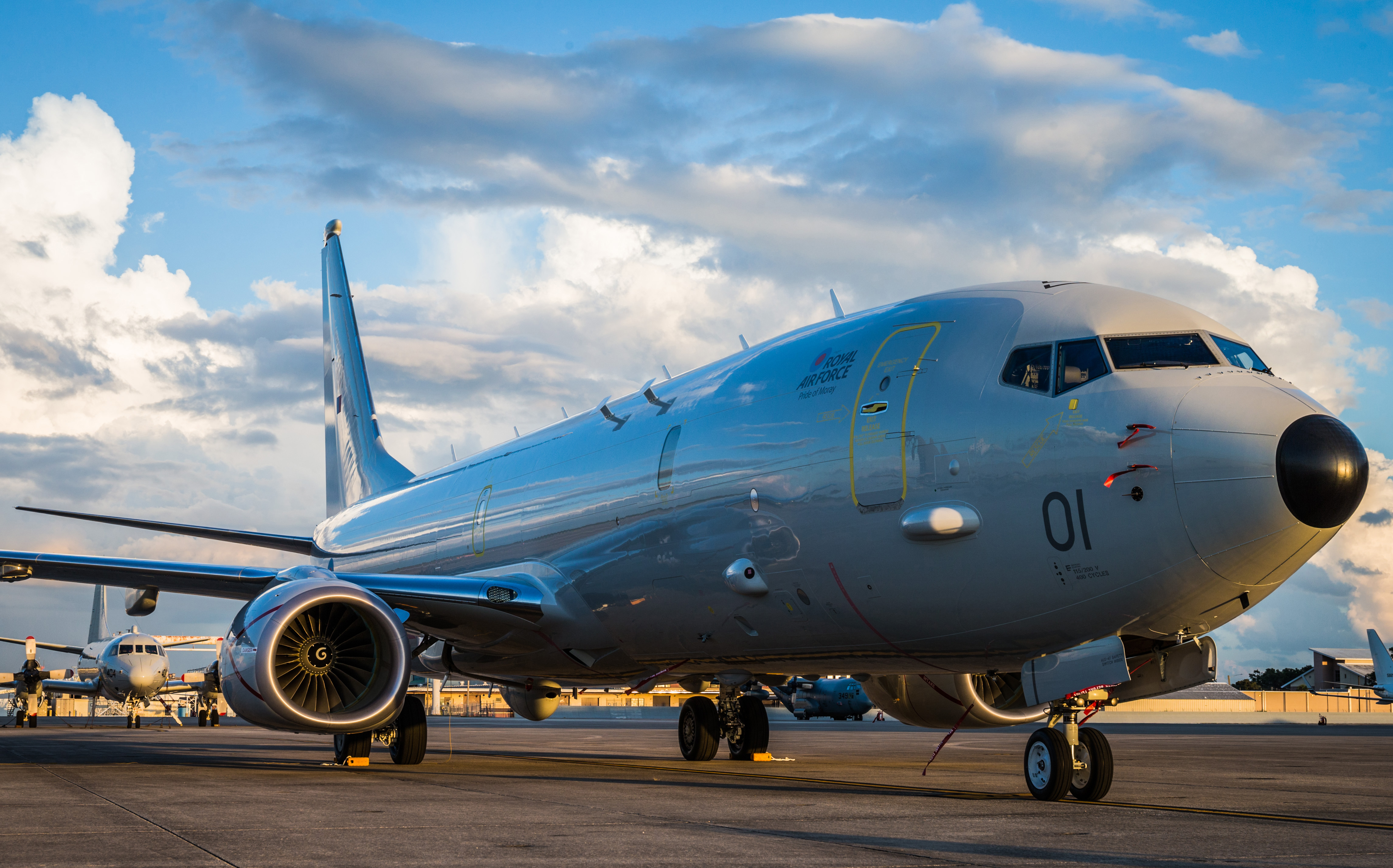
The first P-8 Poseidon delivered to the RAF. Boeing manufacturers the aircraft in the United States and supports its operation by the RAF in the United Kingdom.

As of 2024, the RAF Lossiemouth support base for 9 P-8A Poseidon maritime patrol and attack aircraft is fully operational following a £100 million investment made in 2016. The investment made by Boeing UK included contributing towards refurbishment of the runway, additional aircraft parking and hangar space and accommodation to meet US requirements.

Crawley

See: Boeing Flight Services

== Research and university partnerships ==
Boeing UK partners with six universities.

University of Bristol

Boeing has a partnership with the University of Bristol supporting engineering programs which focus on aerospace, civil and mechanical developments, including unmanned aerial vehicles (UAV). Engineering students in 2015 were developing an unmanned airborne system (UAS) as part of Boeing's UAS project. The UAS was to be used to collect atmospheric data and ash samples from the Fuego volcano in Guatemala. In 2016, Boeing awarded scholarships and £3000 to two engineering students for their academic performance in the fields of Aerospace Engineering and Electrical and Electronic Engineering. Boeing UK also offers a 'Boeing Project Prize'. The prize is given on the recommendation of the head of department in the faculty of engineering to a final year student who submits the best MSc Project in Integrated Aerospace Systems Design.

University of Cambridge

Boeing UK and Cambridge developed and tested the world's first parallel hybrid-electric plane that has the ability to recharge its batteries while it is flying and using 30% less fuel than an aircraft with a petrol-only engine. In its 2017 Supplier of the Year Awards, Boeing UK presented the university with the Boeing Innovation Award for its performance in research and development efforts that had been instrumental to Boeing's products and future business needs.

Cranfield University

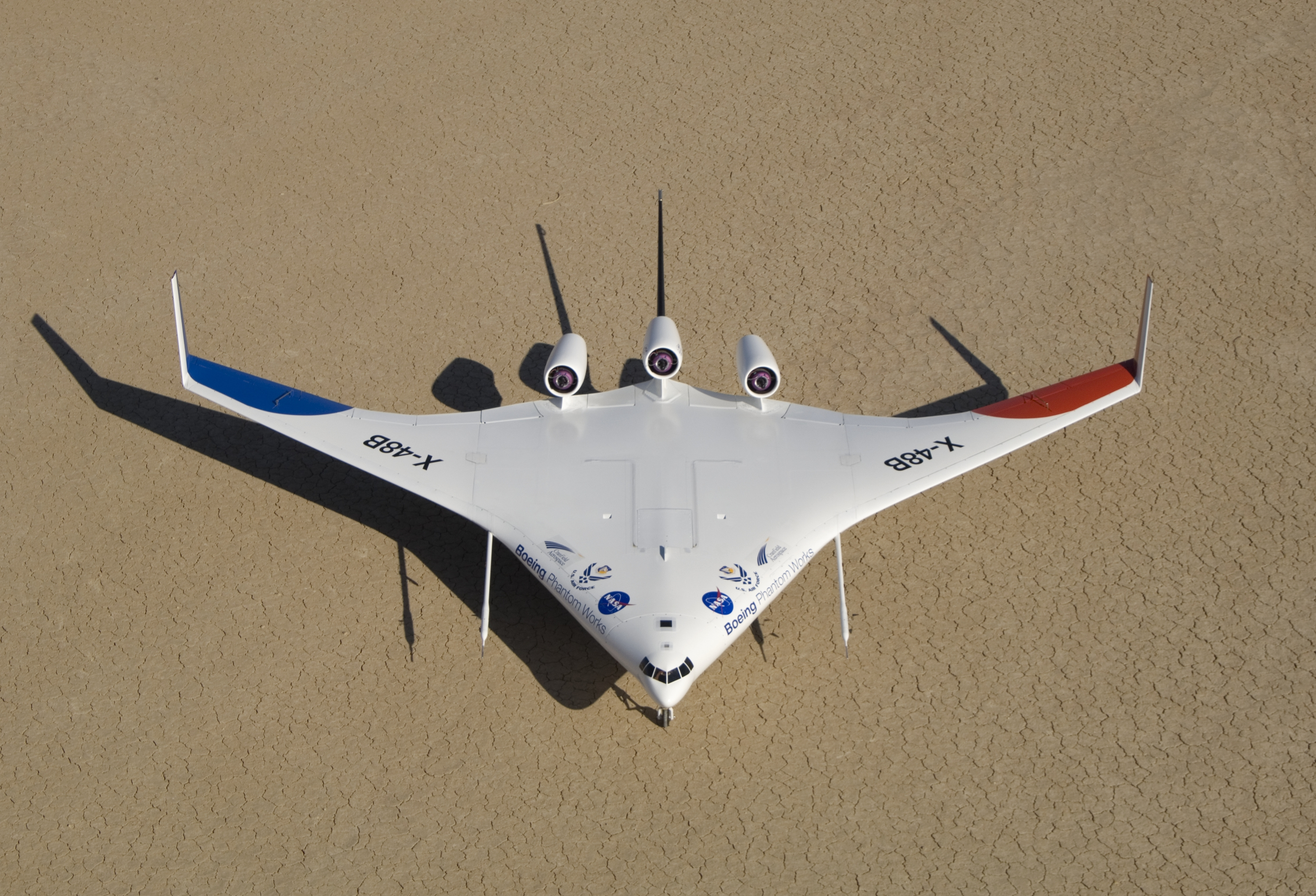
X-48 parked on Rogers Dry Lake. Boeing name and Cranfield Aerospace logo are visible.

Boeing's partnership with Cranfield began in 2002. Boeing designed the X-48 experimental unmanned aerial vehicle using a blended wing body type of flying and Cranfield’s wholly owned commercial subsidiary, Cranfield Aerospace Ltd, built two examples in the UK to Boeing's specifications. In 2008, Boeing and Cransfield announced the formation of the Integrated Vehicle Health Management Centre (IVHM). The centre develops key software for Boeing, enabling it to diagnose impending faults in aircraft environmental control systems (ECS). The university and Boeing signed a collaboration agreement to further extend its relationship and hosted the International Women in Engineering Day at the university's campus in 2017 and again in 2019.

University of Nottingham

Boeing UK and the University of Nottingham initiated a collaboration in carbon fibre recycling in 2011 to develop recycling solutions for Boeing aircraft. Boeing is said to have provided funding of $1,000,000 annually for three years but would continue with a rolling programme.

University of Sheffield

Boeing, in partnership with the University of Sheffield, founded the Advanced Manufacturing Research Centre (AMRC) in 2001. The AMRC develops advanced manufacturing technologies to help reduce the cycle time and cost of producing aerospace products while improving their quality and performance. Boeing's decision to build a manufacturing site in Sheffield is said to be a direct result of the relationship between the university and Boeing.

University of Southampton

Boeing UK extended its business relationship with the University of Southampton in 2009 by sponsoring scholarships for study in the Schools of Engineering Sciences and Management. Boeing UK is also said to have funded prizes for the highest achieving MSc students in Engineering, Operational Research and Management Science.

University of Strathclyde

Boeing partnered with engineering companies including Rolls-Royce and Mettis Aerospace, the University of Strathclyde and the Scottish Executive to establish the Advanced Forming Research Centre (AFRC), located near Glasgow Airport. The AFRC is developing forging technologies to support the design and manufacture of new products including components structures for airframes, aero engines, landing gear, power generation, cars, ships, medical devices and wind turbines.

== Community partnerships and projects ==
Boeing engages in community-let projects throughout the UK, supporting aerospace projects and charities in environmental and STEM-based activities.

=== Current partnerships ===
Royal Aeronautical Society

Boeing UK, in partnership with the Royal Aeronautical Society, initiated The Schools Build-a-Plane Challenge (SBAP) programme in 2008, aimed at motivating young people in the areas of science, technology, engineering and mathematics (STEM). The project provides students from secondary schools across the UK with the opportunity to build a light aircraft from a kit. The schools also have a chance to fly in their completed aircraft as well as engaging in public events around the programme. Four schools finished including Yateley, Marling, Ercall Wood Technology College and Ernesford Grange Community Academy.

Air League

Boeing's partnership with the Air League began in 2012 with the announcement of the Gliding to Solo programme. The programme sees young people from inner-city schools complete a two-week residential gliding course. Later that year, Boeing UK and The Air League announced they would provide flying scholarships for 14 wounded servicemen and women in 2013. The scholarships are made in collaboration with British charities Help for Heroes and Aerobility who provide flying lessons in specially modified aircraft. Boeing UK is also a sponsor of The Air League's scholarships in flying and ballooning for both disabled people and wounded former armed services personnel. Karl Hinnet, a soldier who was severely wounded in a battle in 2005, received a Boeing scholarship in 2013 which enabled him to learn to fly.

Centennial Wings

Centennial Wings is a programme by Boeing UK in partnership with the Air League and the Royal Air Force allowing children the ability to build an ultra-light aircraft. Launched at Farnborough in 2018, air cadets ATC in the Northern Ireland Wing assembled a Sting S4 ultra-light aircraft from kit which was then showcased at the Royal International Air Tattoo at RAF Fairford the same year. The completed Sting S4 will then be used for flight training, once it has been certified to fly by the Light Aircraft Association.

The Prince’s Trust

Boeing UK supports a personal development programme run by The Prince's trust, aimed at young people at risk of underachievement or exclusion from school. Boeing UK also supports the ‘Get Started with Product Design’ course at the Advanced Manufacturing Research Centre (AMRC) with Boeing, a week-long training course run by The Prince’s Trust with the aim of equipping young people with the skills to go onto education, training or work in the area of engineering.

Royal Academy of Engineering (RAEng)

The RAEng and Boeing UK launched the 'Mission to Mars', a STEM learning resource that provides students with technology, science, engineering and mathematics of exploring space via 50 state primary and secondary schools. The partnership allows for the recruitment of four to five specialist STEM teachers to work in these schools and provide support to staff teaching these disciplines. The Mission to Mars resource base consists of three sections: Launch, Landing and Life on Mars detailing the journey in getting to the planet Mars.

Royal Academy of Arts (RA)

Boeing UK's partnership with the RA involves supporting practical workshops for primary, secondary and further education students involving artistic expression and design skills. The workshops encourage students to experiment and think methodically in their approach to art by allowing them to use different materials and techniques by creating paintings, sculptures, collages, drawings or prints.

=== Previous partnerships ===
Boeing UK supported the non-profit organisation the Earth Restoration Service (ERS) via its Tree Nurseries Programme which involved children planting native trees in hundreds of schools across the UK.

The American Air Museum located at the Imperial War Museum in Duxford partnered with Boeing UK in an educational outreach and teacher training programme called 'Partners in Flight'. The programme was aimed at primary school children involving practical and theory sessions in model building and problem solving. The practical session required the children to re-assemble a 1/8 scale model of a Boeing B-29 Superfortress from its component parts while the theory session, in relation to STEM, involved navigating and calculating routes of an aircraft while also measuring optimum air pressure for sustainable human life.

In 2015, Boeing UK supported Stansted Airport's on-site education centre called Aerozone Stansted which sought to inspire children in engineering and STEM-based disciplines and showcase careers in the aviation industry.
