= Air Routing International =

- Type: Privately held company
- Industry: Business Aviation
- Founded: 1978
- Founder: Rudy Fabre, Tom Balousek, Richard Wilkens
- Defunct: 2010
- Fate: Acquired
- Successor: Rockwell Collins
- Headquarters: Houston, Texas, U.S.
- Services: Flight planning, aviation weather, Jet A fuel, and aircraft ground handling
- Parent: Rockwell Collins
- Website: www.airrouting.com

Air Routing International (commonly called Air Routing or ARI), was a worldwide provider of international trip support and corporate flight handling since 1978. Air Routing was acquired by Rockwell Collins in January 2010.

Air Routing International was founded by Rudy Fabre, Tom Balousek, and Richard Wilkens in 1978. The founders developed a network of agents in markets throughout the world.

The company's technical platform, Flight Manager, the cornerstone of Air Routing's client interface, was introduced in 1998. Flight Manager, in tandem with Air Routing's staff, is used by flight departments to obtain current flight details on their planned trip.

Air routing has been expanding its service offerings since its inception which, today, include arranging on-board catering, ground transportation, and hotel reservations for business, private, and government flight operations. Air Routing International and its associates, Wilkens Weather, Air Routing Fuel and Air Routing Card Services, maintain its corporate headquarters in Houston, Texas.

== Memberships and affiliations ==
- National Business Aviation Association, Inc. (NBAA)
- European Business Aviation Association (EBAA)
- Middle East Business Aviation Association (MEBAA)
- Asian Business Aviation Association (AsBAA)

== Other flight support providers ==
- Jeppesen
- Universal Weather and Aviation
