= Bravo Family Foundation =

U.S. nonprofit organization working in Puerto Rico

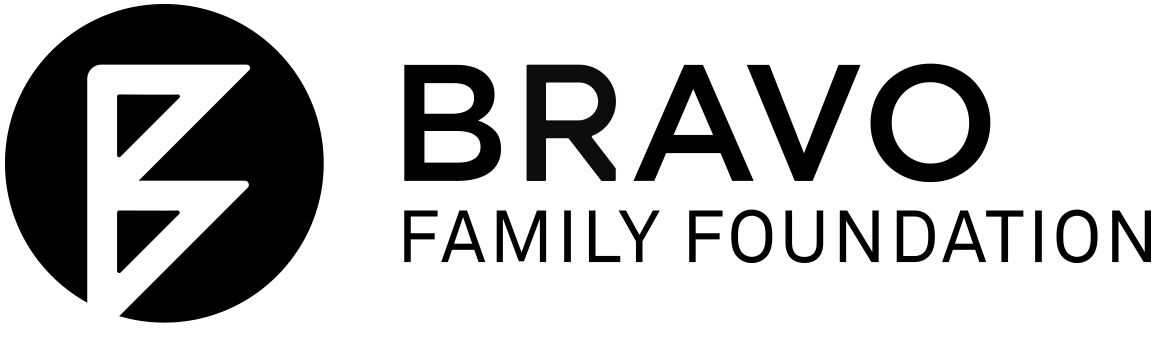
- Formation: 2017; 9 years ago
- Founder: Orlando Bravo
- Type: 501(c)(3)
- Tax ID no.: 82-3513069
- Legal status: foundation
- Headquarters: San Francisco, California
- Disbursements: $1,040,193 (Form 990)
- Website: www.bravofamilyfoundation.org

The Bravo Family Foundation is an American 501(c)(3) nonprofit organization whose mission is "to promote the basic principles of social justice in Puerto Rico". The organization was established in 2017 by Thoma Bravo founder Orlando Bravo in the wake of Hurricane Maria, the worst natural disaster in recorded history to affect Puerto Rico. Following the foundation's initial involvement in hurricane relief, it has continued to provide long-term education and entrepreneurship programs for young adults in Puerto Rico, as well as healthcare initiatives and early childhood education programs. The foundation also provides grants to entrepreneurs in Puerto Rico and has $37 million in assets, of which $1,040,193 had been disbursed as of 2020.

== History, programs and initiatives ==
The organization was established in 2017 by Thoma Bravo founder Orlando Bravo in the wake of Hurricane Maria. In September 2017, Hurricane Maria, a Category 5 hurricane, caused catastrophic damage to the northeastern Caribbean, killing an estimated 2,975 in Puerto Rico and causing approximately $90 billion in damage. In response to news of the lack of supplies in many Puerto Rican communities as a result of the hurricane, combined with the local government's professed inability to help, Thoma Bravo founder and Puerto Rico native Orlando Bravo used his personal resources to bring supplies to the island. Bravo used means such as a chartered cargo plane and two large container ships to transport over 600,000 pounds of supplies to Puerto Rico. The supply-chain solution established by the foundation helped bring humanitarian aid to the west coast of Puerto Rico.

Later that month, Bravo formed the Bravo Family Foundation and pledged $10 million to hurricane recovery efforts through a program called "Podemos Puerto Rico" ("We Can Puerto Rico").

In August 2018, the foundation launched the Exceptional Community Leaders program, with the goal of "increasing the number of youth in Puerto Rico who are running successful service-culture ventures". The program provides chosen nonprofit organizations with a $100,000 grant and a content facilitator and works to professionalize the organizations and improve their internal structures.

In May 2019, Orlando Bravo announced that he would be personally contributing $100 million to the foundation to start a program aimed at promoting entrepreneurship and economic development in Puerto Rico. The foundation is motivated to support, among others, the engineering students at the University of Puerto Rico at Mayagüez, on the west coast of Puerto Rico hoping to stop the brain drain.

In January 2020, the foundation launched the Rising Entrepreneurs Program in Mayagüez, Orlando Bravo's hometown. The program functions as a startup accelerator for early-stage Puerto Rican companies, with a mission of providing participants with "knowledge, access and capital as a means to create a more inclusive and sustainable ecosystem for tech companies in Puerto Rico". In that first edition of the program, ten Puerto Rico startup businesses were selected out of 32 entrants and each received a one-time seed grant of $30,000; three of the ten later received additional prizes.

In November 2020, the foundation launched the Puerto Rico Digital Education Access Initiative, gifting equipment that provides free internet access to public school students in poor communities throughout Puerto Rico and by March 2021 almost 6,700 students had been directly impacted by this specific foundation initiative.

In the years following Hurricane Maria, the foundation launched long-term programs focused on strengthening underserved communities in Puerto Rico by providing opportunities for young people and entrepreneurs, including the Exceptional Community Leaders program, the Rising Entrepreneurs Program and the Puerto Rico Digital Education Access Initiative.

The Bravo Family Foundation made a quarter of a million donation to help victims of the Surfside condominium building collapse, a tragic event that occurred on June 24, 2021, in Surfside, Florida. In 2022, the foundation pledged support for communities in Puerto Rico affected by Hurricane Fiona.

== See also ==
- Special Communities in Puerto Rico
