= Michael Jenkins (diplomat) =

British diplomat (1936–2013)

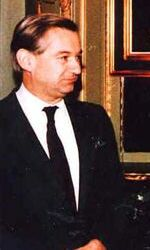
Michael Jenkins (1991)

Sir Michael Romily Heald Jenkins, KCMG (9 January 1936 – 31 March 2013) was a British diplomat.

Born in Cambridge and son of the Byzantine scholar, Romilly Jenkins, he was trained as a Russian interpreter during his National Service. He subsequently studied languages and history as an Exhibitioner at King's College, Cambridge (1956–59), from where he graduated and joined the Diplomatic Service in 1959. Following senior postings in Europe, including ten years at the European Commission, he became Minister at the British Embassy in Washington, and in 1988 Ambassador to the Netherlands. He retired from the Foreign Office in 1993 after which he joined the Board of Kleinwort Benson as an executive director, becoming Vice-Chairman of Dresdner Kleinwort Benson in 1996. For five years he was a non-executive director of Aegon, the Dutch-based insurance company. In 2003 he was appointed President of Boeing UK.

In 2007, he joined the Board of Geopark, the Aim listed oil and gas company, as a non-executive Director; and in March 2008, Sir Michael became Chairman of Matra Petroleum plc.

Sir Michael held several senior positions at the Marylebone Cricket Club (MCC) and was Chairman of the Club from 2000–2001. He was also a Commissioner at the Royal Hospital Chelsea.

While serving a tour of duty in Moscow, he researched a biography of Aleksey Arakcheyev which was published in 1969, and towards the end of his diplomatic career he wrote a memoir of his youth, A House in Flanders. He also edited a memoir by his aunt, the writer Elizabeth Jenkins, which was published in 2005, her 100th year.

Jenkins was made a Knight Commander of the Order of St Michael and St George in 1989 for his diplomatic services.

== Books ==
- Arakcheev: Grand Vizier of the Russian Empire (Faber and Faber, and The Dial Press, 1969) ISBN 0-571-08222-X
- A House in Flanders (Souvenir Press 1992, Meulenhoff 1992, Minerva 1993, Viking 1993, Clausen 1994 & La Table Ronde 1996) ISBN 0-670-84780-1
- The View from Downshire Hill (Editor) (Michael Russell 2005)
