= Elrey Borge Jeppesen =

American aviation pioneer

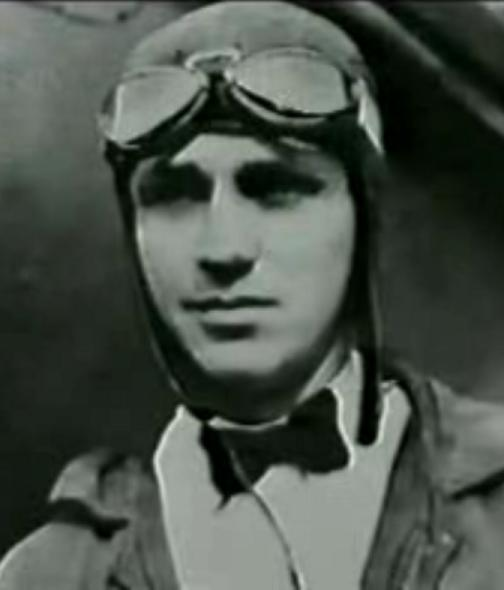
Jeppesen, before 1923

Elrey Borge Jeppesen (January 28, 1907 – November 26, 1996) was an American aviation pioneer noted for his contributions in the field of air navigation. He worked as a pilot and began making detailed notes about his routes at a time when aviators had to rely on little more than automobile road maps and landmarks for navigation. He created manuals and charts that enabled pilots to fly much more safely. Finding a demand existed for his work, he founded the Jeppesen company in 1934 to sell what he had developed.

== Biography ==
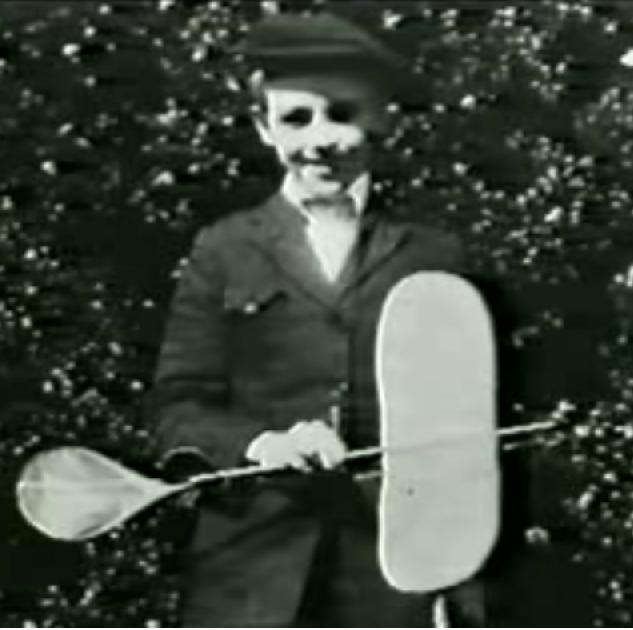
Jeppesen at age 13 or less (picture taken no later than 1920)

Jeppesen was born on January 28, 1907, in Lake Charles, Louisiana, United States. His parents were immigrants from Denmark. His father, Jens Hans Jeppesen, was an architect and builder trained in Denmark. Elrey grew up on a farm that his father had cleared and homesteaded in Odell, Oregon, before moving to Portland.

As a child, Jeppesen spent hours watching eagles fly, and flying became his obsession. In 1921, 14-year-old Jeppesen got his first taste of flying when a barnstormer took him up in a Curtiss JN-4 "Jenny" for a 10-minute flight for US$4 (very roughly equivalent to $72 in 2025).

In 1925, at the age of 18, he joined Tex Rankin's Flying Circus "as a ticket taker, a prop turner, a wing walker, and an aerial acrobat". He soloed after two hours and 10 minutes of flying lessons and purchased his own Jenny for $500, using money borrowed from customers on his newspaper route. For two years beginning in 1928, he worked for Fairchild Aerial Surveys, flying photographers to map Mexico in a de Havilland DH-4. That same year, the United States government issued its first pilot's licenses; Jeppesen had Oregon's 27th license. His pilot license number is 7034 and was signed by Orville Wright. His Mexican pilot license number is 33.

In 1930, Jeppesen joined Boeing Air Transport as an airmail pilot. On May 15, 1930, he was the pilot of the flight carrying the first stewardess, Ellen Church. (Heinrich Kubis had been the first male flight attendant in 1912.)

While airway beacons assisted aerial navigation on specific routes, most pilots at that time depended on dead reckoning, generally using automobile road maps (such as those from oil companies or commercial mapmakers), railroad tracks, and landmarks to find their way. Jeppesen purchased a 10-cent notebook and started writing down detailed notes about his routes. He even climbed hills to determine their height and collected telephone numbers of farmers willing to provide weather reports. Word got around about his "little black book", and soon he was giving copies to his fellow pilots. Jeppesen was the first to design en-route procedures, let-down procedures, approach procedures, and the all-important, missed-approach procedure. If the weather were bad and visibility dropped to zero, if the Jeppesen Airway Manual had a missed approach procedure for that particular airport, the pilot could use it to determine what heading to turn, how to miss any mountains, and how high to climb. Today, many airlines use the Jeppesen Airway Manual for navigation. In 1934, as demand picked up, Jeppesen founded Jeppesen & Co. in the basement of his Salt Lake City home to sell his information for $10 (equivalent to $241 in 2025) a copy.

On September 24, 1936, Jeppesen married his flight attendant, Nadine Liscomb. She helped him run his company, working as secretary and treasurer until the company was sold in 1961.

On June 10, 1941, Jeppesen was involved in an accident at Denver Municipal Airport. While landing in a rainstorm, the United DC-3 aircraft overran the landing area, traveling through the airport boundary lights and into a 3 ft (1 m) ditch where the right landing gear failed. Neither the crew nor any of the 15 passengers were injured, but the aircraft itself sustained major damage.

In the 1940s, with the onset of World War II, the United States Army and Navy kept Jeppesen busy supplying them with his charts. Jeppesen retired from United Airlines (into which Boeing Air Transport had merged) in 1954.

In 1961, Jeppesen sold his company, staying on as chairman.

On November 26, 1996, Jeppesen died at the age of 89.

== Legacy ==
The Jeppesen Company continues to exist today, formerly as a subsidiary of Boeing Commercial Airplanes, which acquired the business in October 2000.

A 16-foot (4.9 m) statue of Jeppesen, by artist George Lundeen, was in the center of the main terminal at Denver International Airport. Around the base of the statue was the accolade: "Airmail Pilot - Airline Captain - Wing Walker - Air Navigation Pioneer - Barnstormer - Air Safety Pioneer - Businessman - Instructor". The main terminal is also named in his honor. Jeppesen was the first passenger to disembark from the first flight to arrive at the new airport, United Flight 1474 from Colorado Springs on February 28, 1995.

The Museum of Flight holds the Elrey B. Jeppesen Collection in its archives. A facsimile of the Little Black Book is also on display in the museum's galleries.

== Honors ==
- International Air & Space Hall of Fame in 1995
- National Aviation Hall of Fame in 1990
- Colorado Aviation Hall of Fame in 1970
- Oregon Aviation Hall of Honor
- OX5 Aviation Hall of Fame
- National Business Aviation Association Meritorious Service to Aviation Award in 1965
- Edward Warner Award in 1995
- Tony Jannus Award in 1975
