= Inverness, Colorado =

Census-designated place in Arapahoe County, CO, USA

- Census-designated place
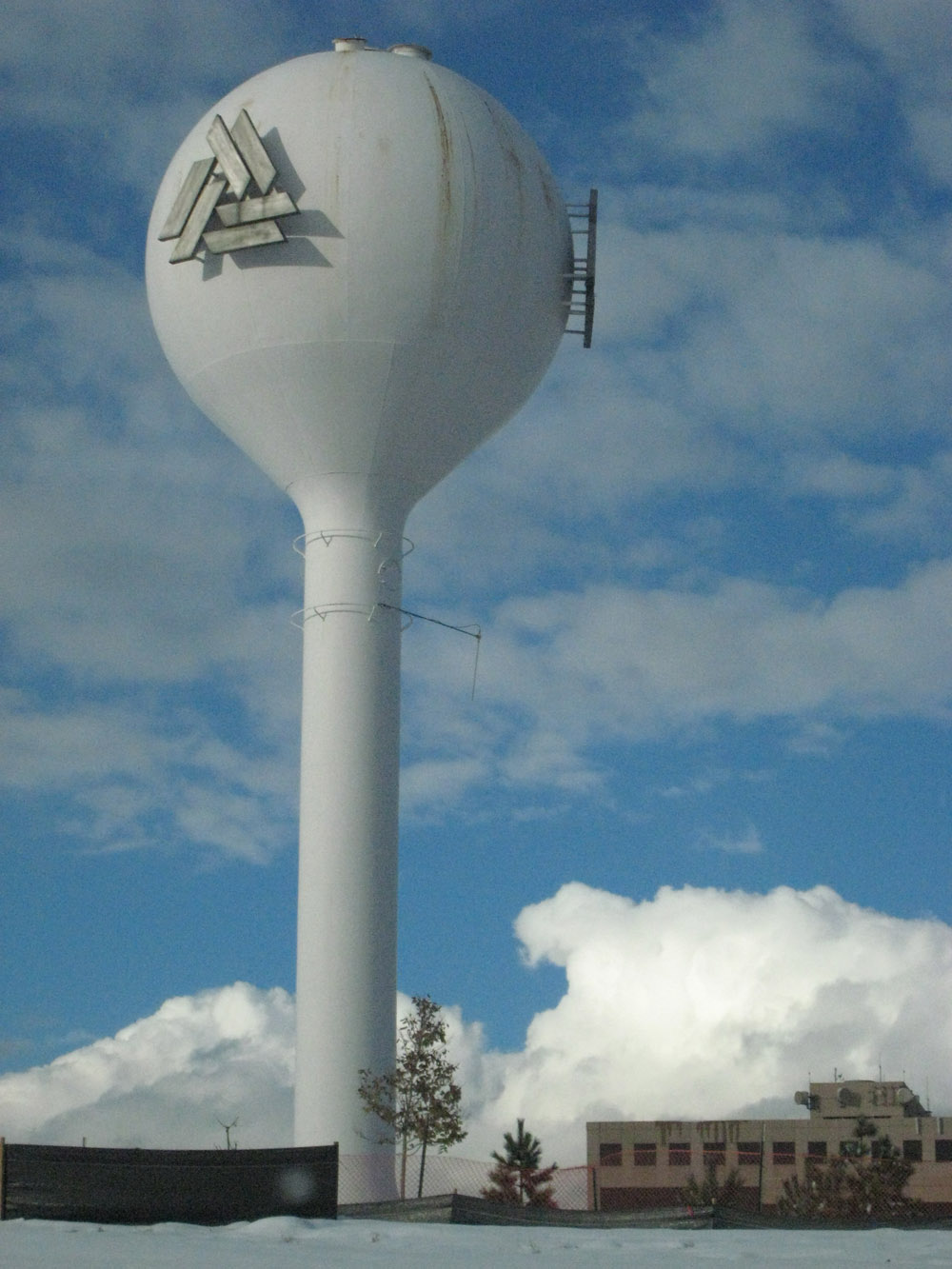
- Water tower at the Inverness Exchange

- Location of the Inverness CDP in Arapahoe County, Colorado
- Coordinates: 39°34′45″N 104°52′18″W
- Country: United States
- State: Colorado
- County: Arapahoe County

Government
  - Type: unincorporated community

Area
  - Total: 1.117 sq mi (2.893 km^{2})
  - Land: 1.117 sq mi (2.893 km^{2})
  - Water: 0 sq mi (0.000 km^{2})
- Elevation: 5,804 ft (1,769 m)

Population (2020)
  - Total: 2,226
  - Density: 1,993/sq mi (769.4/km^{2})
- Time zone: UTC-7 (MST)
  - Summer (DST): UTC-6 (MDT)
- ZIP Code: 80112
- Area codes: 303 & 720
- GNIS feature ID: 2629990

Inverness is an unincorporated community and a census-designated place (CDP) located in and governed by Arapahoe County, Colorado, United States. The CDP is a part of the Denver–Aurora–Lakewood, CO Metropolitan Statistical Area. The population of the Inverness CDP was 2,226 at the United States Census 2020. The Inverness Metropolitan Improvement District and the Inverness Water & Sanitation District provide services to the area, which lies in ZIP code 80112.

== Geography ==
The Inverness CDP has an area of 715 acres (2.893 km^{2}), all land.

== Economy ==
Inverness is the location of Inverness Exchange, where aerospace company Jeppesen and electronics wholesaler Arrow Electronics, the largest company in Colorado in terms of revenue, are headquartered.

== Demographics ==
Inverness CDP, Colorado
Year	Pop.	±%
2010	1,532	—
2020	2,226	+45.3%
Source: United States Census Bureau

=== 2020 census ===
As of the 2020 census, Inverness had a population of 2,226. The median age was 34.6 years. 9.5% of residents were under the age of 18 and 10.5% of residents were 65 years of age or older. For every 100 females there were 107.3 males, and for every 100 females age 18 and over there were 111.2 males age 18 and over.

100.0% of residents lived in urban areas, while 0.0% lived in rural areas.

There were 1,311 households in Inverness, of which 11.4% had children under the age of 18 living in them. Of all households, 29.5% were married-couple households, 33.8% were households with a male householder and no spouse or partner present, and 27.4% were households with a female householder and no spouse or partner present. About 46.8% of all households were made up of individuals and 5.9% had someone living alone who was 65 years of age or older.

There were 1,478 housing units, of which 11.3% were vacant. The homeowner vacancy rate was 2.8% and the rental vacancy rate was 10.3%.

Racial composition as of the 2020 census
Race	Number	Percent
White	1,511	67.9%
Black or African American	121	5.4%
American Indian and Alaska Native	12	0.5%
Asian	317	14.2%
Native Hawaiian and Other Pacific Islander	0	0.0%
Some other race	75	3.4%
Two or more races	190	8.5%
Hispanic or Latino (of any race)	260	11.7%

=== 2010 census ===
The United States Census Bureau initially defined the Inverness CDP for the United States Census 2010.

== See also ==
- Front Range Urban Corridor
