= Nadine Jeppesen =

American publisher

Nadine Liscomb Jeppesen (September 14, 1914 – June 10, 1996) was an American flight attendant who became a publisher of flight maps.

== Early life and education ==
Nadine Audrey Liscomb was born in Dunlap, Iowa, the daughter of Georgia Ferrill Liscomb and Chauncey Ettinger Liscomb. Her father died in the epidemic and her mother remarried to Donald Prentiss Liscomb, a cousin. She graduated from nursing school in 1934, then trained as a stewardess in Omaha, Nebraska.

== Career ==
Liscomb was a 21-year-old stewardess in 1936, when she married a pilot, Elrey Borge Jeppesen, and was required to stop flying. She remained interested in aviation, and in 1939 was voted one of the directors of the Salt Lake City chapter of the Women's National Aeronautic Association.

The Jeppesens started a business publishing flight charts, with first-hand knowledge of what was useful and necessary in such documents. The Jeppesen Airway Manual was first published from their home in Salt Lake City, and later from a storefront in Denver, Colorado, with Nadine Jeppesen overseeing the publication's design and hiring cartographers. The manuals were an established resource for pilots before the start of World War II, which increased demand for them. Nadine Jeppesen was responsible for marketing, publicity, and accounting at the company, while Elrey Jeppesen continued to fly for United Airlines until 1954. The Jeppesens sold their company in 1961, to the Times Mirror Corporation. The company, still known as Jeppesen, has been a subsidiary of Boeing since 2000.

Nadine Jeppesen received the National Aeronautic Association's Katharine Wright Award in 1994, for significant contributions to aviation. She was inducted into the Women in Aviation International Pioneer Hall of Fame in 1995. She died the following year, at age 81. Elrey Jeppesen died several months later; they were survived by their two sons.
