= Olo (online ordering) =

Restaurant-focused business-to-business software as a service company

Olo Inc.
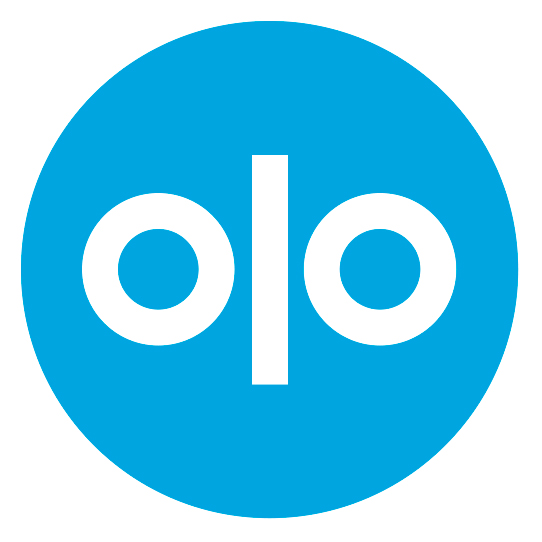
- Type: Private
- Traded as: NYSE: OLO
- Industry: Internet, Mobile, Restaurants
- Founded: June 2005; 21 years ago in New York City, U.S.
- Founder: Noah Glass
- Headquarters: One World Trade Center, New York City, U.S.
- Key people: Noah Glass (CEO)
- Revenue: ▲US$285 million (2024)
- Operating income: ▲US$−19 million (2024)
- Net income: ▲US$−897,000 (2024)
- Total assets: ▲US$754 million (2024)
- Total equity: ▲US$683 million (2024)
- Owner: Thoma Bravo
- Number of employees: 617 (2024)
- Website: olo.com

Olo Inc. is an American business-to-business software as a service company that develops digital ordering and delivery programs for restaurants.

Based in New York City, the company’s platform allows customers to place restaurant orders from multiple origination points – from a brand’s own website or app, third party marketplaces, social media platforms, smart speakers, and home assistants. It also provides restaurants with order analytics and other services.

== History ==
Olo was founded as GoMobo in 2005 by Noah Glass in New Haven. The company's initial product was a mobile phone app that allowed users to pre-order food via text message from coffee shops for pick-up.

In 2010, the company changed its name to Olo ("online ordering") to reflect its change from being a customer-facing application to being a B2B software company, "invisible" to customers, used by restaurants to manage mobile device orders.

Fortune reported in 2015 that restaurants using Olo software had served approximately 10 million customers.

In 2017, Shake Shack launched the Shake App created by Olo; other restaurant brands using Olo software include Denny's and Wingstop.

In 2019, Olo formed a partnership with Google to provide the interface between Google Search and other Google applications to connect customers with local restaurants, allowing them to place orders directly, without using third-party ordering apps such as DoorDash and Postmates. ChowNow, a competitor B2B restaurant order-management SaaS company, has a similar arrangement with Google.

On March 17, 2021, Olo went public on the New York Stock Exchange and its IPO raised approximately $450 million. In October, Olo announced its acquisition of Wisely, a customer intelligence platform that uses consumer data to personalize online ordering.

In February 2022, the company launched a service called Olo Pay which enables customers to make one-click online purchases from any restaurant in Olo’s network. In the same month, the firm acquired Omnivore, a company that developed technology services for restaurants.

Starting in August 2022, Olo stock plunged as restaurants delayed deploying their ordering software. Following the drop in Olo's share price, several law firms filed what Restaurant Business described as "stock-drop suits", a common type of lawsuit following a substantial drop in a public company's share prices where lawyers for investors attempt to show that the company intentionally withheld information related to the price fall from its shareholders.

In July 2023, Jo Lambert was named the chief operating officer (COO). Two years later, private equity firm Thoma Bravo agreed to take Olo private in an all-cash deal valued at approximately $2 billion. On September 12, 2025, Thoma Bravo announced that it had completed the purchase of Olo.

== Funding ==
The company has raised funds from Founder Collective, RRE Ventures, Core Capital, PayPal, Staley Capital, The Raine Group, Danny Meyer (CEO of Union Square Hospitality Group), and private investors.

In January 2020, Bloomberg News reported that Olo might be seeking an IPO with a valuation of $1 billion. Those plans were put on hold due to COVID-19. The company went public in March 2021 with a valuation of $3.6 billion.
