= Thoma Bravo =

American private equity firm

Thoma Bravo, LP
- Type: Private
- Industry: Private equity
- Predecessors: Golder Thoma & Co.; Golder Thoma Cressey Rauner (GTCR); Thoma Cressey Equity Partners; Thoma Cressey Bravo
- Founded: 2008; 18 years ago
- Founders: Carl Thoma; Orlando Bravo
- Headquarters: Chicago, Illinois, U.S.
- Number of locations: 5
- Key people: Seth Boro (Managing Partner); Scott Crabill (Managing Partner); Lee M. Mitchell (Managing Partner); Holden Spaht (Managing Partner)
- Products: Investments, private equity funds, private credit funds
- AUM: US$183 billion (2026)
- Number of employees: 212 (2023)
- Website: thomabravo.com

Thoma Cressey Equity Partners logo in use before 2007 when the firm changed its name

Thoma Bravo, LP is an American private equity and growth capital firm based in Chicago, Illinois. It is known for being particularly active in acquiring enterprise software companies and had over $183 billion in assets under management as of 2026.

It is the successor to the firm Golder Thoma & Co., which was established in 1980 by Stanley Golder and Carl Thoma. Thoma Bravo is led by managing partners Seth Boro, Orlando Bravo, Scott Crabill, Lee Mitchell, Holden Spaht and Carl Thoma.

The company focuses on the application, infrastructure and cybersecurity software and technology-enabled business service sectors, and uses a "consolidation" or "buy and build" investment strategy.

== Investments ==
As of 2026, the company had completed over 565 software and technology transactions and oversaw a portfolio of over 77 software companies.

=== Software investments ===
Thoma Cressey Equity Partners began investing in the enterprise software sector in 2002 with the acquisition of Prophet 21, a provider of software for durable goods distributors.

In 2014, the company acquired Riverbed Technology for $3.6 billion. Riverbed later filed for Chapter 11 Bankruptcy in December 2021.

In 2016, the company acquired Imprivata for $19.25 per share, estimated at a total of $544 million, under Imprivata´s CEO Omar Hussain.

In 2019, Thoma Bravo acquired ConnectWise, a complete business automation platform for managed service providers (MSPs) founded by technology entrepreneur Arnie Bellini.

After the purchase of edtech company Instructure in 2020, the purchase was accused of being "rushed" and "riddled by conflicts of interest" by a large shareholder at the time. In July 2024, it was announced that Thoma Bravo would sell Instructure in a take-private transaction valuing the company at approximately $4.8 billion.

In October 2021, Thoma Bravo took enterprise software company Medallia private for $6.4 billion. In June 2026 Business Wire reported that Medallia has entered an agreement which changes ownership from Thoma Bravo to an investor group led by Blackstone, Apollo, and FS KKR Capital Corp (FSK).

In September 2021, Thoma Bravo completed the acquisition of Stamps.com, an e-commerce shipping service provider, for approximately $6.6 billion in cash, and subsequently rebranded the company as Auctane. In March 2026, Thoma Bravo announced an agreement to acquire third-party logistics provider WWEX Group, with plans to merge WWEX and Auctane.

In March 2022, Thoma Bravo acquired the enterprise cloud software company Anaplan for $10.7 billion (€9.6bn). The acquisition completed in June 2022 following Thoma Bravo cutting the takeover offer down to $10.4 billion after alleging that the company had violated the acquisition terms by overpaying new hires.

In August 2022, the company agreed to buy Nearmap, its first Australian acquisition, for A$1.06 billion (US$730 million). it has done over 300 software deals since 2003 and oversees a portfolio of over 40 software companies.

In December 2022, the company outbid Vista Equity Partners to announce its acquisition of Coupa Software for $6.15 billion in cash, and a total enterprise value of $8 billion.

In September 2023, Arlington Capital Partners announced it had bought Exostar, a software company headquartered in Herndon, Virginia, from Thoma Bravo for an undisclosed amount.

In November 2023, the company acquired health-records software company NextGen Healthcare for a total enterprise value of $1.8 billion.

In March 2024, the company agreed to take Everbridge, a provider of critical event management software, private for approximately $1.8 billion.

In December 2024, Thoma Bravo completed the acquisition of a majority stake in USU Product Business, an IT management solutions provider. It said it has invested as a new major shareholder and plans to invest additionally in the company to accelerate business growth and product innovation.

In April 2025, Thoma Bravo agreed to purchase portions of Boeing's Digital Aviation Solutions business from its Boeing Global Services division, including its Jeppesen, ForeFlight, AerData and OzRunways assets for $10.55 billion. In November that year, Boeing announced that it had closed the sale to Thoma Bravo in an all-cash transaction, with the acquired businesses combined into the standalone Jeppesen ForeFlight company. In January 2026, the acquired companies laid off a reported 40% to 50% of their staff.

In July 2025, the company announced its acquisition of the restaurant software provider Olo in an all-cash deal valued at approximately $2 billion. The following month, Thoma Bravo agreed to take human capital management software provider Dayforce private in a $12.3 billion deal that also included a significant minority investment from the Abu Dhabi Investment Authority. The acquisition was completed in February 2026.

Also that month, August 2025, the company agreed to take Verint Systems private in a $2 billion deal. Thoma Bravo intended its portfolio company Calabrio to partner with Verint on automating CX workflows with AI, once the acquisition is approved.

In September 2025, Thoma Bravo agreed to acquire PROS Holdings, a provider of AI-powered software for pricing and selling, for approximately $1.4 billion. The transaction was completed in December 2025. Following the acquisition, Thoma Bravo separated PROS's travel business as a standalone portfolio company and combined its business-to-business operations with its existing portfolio company Conga.

In August 2026, Thoma Bravo agreed to acquire specialty insurance technology company Accelerant for $4.4 billion. Under the agreement, shareholders would receive $20.25 per share in cash, representing a 49% premium to Accelerant's share price before the announcement. The transaction is expected to close in the first half of 2027, subject to customary conditions.

=== Security investments ===
In 2018, Thoma Bravo took cloud-first security provider Barracuda Networks private for $1.6 billion. In April 2022, it sold Barracuda to KKR for about $4 billion.

In January 2019, Thoma Bravo acquired Imperva for $2.1 billion. In July 2023, it then sold the company to Thales Group for $3.6 billion.

In March 2020, Thoma Bravo completed its $3.9 billion acquisition of Sophos.

On August 31, 2021, Thoma Bravo completed its $12.3 billion acquisition of Proofpoint.

In 2022, Thoma Bravo made a series of security related investments. In April, it announced the acquisition of identity security company SailPoint for $6.9 billion with financing from private lenders. In August, it agreed to buy Ping Identity for $2.8 billion in an all-cash transaction. In October, it agreed to buy ForgeRock for $2.3 billion.

Thoma Bravo acquired Canada-based digital investigation software maker Magnet Forensics for CA$1.8 billion (US$1.34bn) in 2023, and merged it with Grayshift, a digital forensics firm in its existing portfolio that it gained majority control the previous year.

In April 2024, Thoma Bravo agreed to acquire Darktrace, a UK-based cybersecurity company, in a private transaction valued at $5.3 billion.

=== Fintech investments ===
In June 2021, Thoma Bravo invested $125 million into FTX. Following the collapse of FTX, in February 2023, Thoma Bravo, Paradigm Operations and Sequoia Capital were sued for allegedly making “materially false and misleading statements" while promoting FTX and "aided and abetted the misconduct that led to the collapse of the FTX Entities.” In 2024, Orlando Bravo stated that the firm would cease making further cryptocurrency investments due to the fallout.

In July 2021, Thoma Bravo acquired clinical payment technology provider, Greenphire LLC.

In May 2022, Thoma Bravo acquired Bottomline Technologies for $2.6 billion.

In June 2023, Thoma Bravo agreed to divest Adenza to Nasdaq, Inc. for $10.5 billion in a cash-and-stock deal. As part of the deal, it would get a 15 percent stake in Nasdaq. In May 2025, Thoma Bravo sold its remaining stake in Nasdaq for approximately $3.4 billion in two separate transactions.

== History ==
In 1980, Stanley Golder and Carl Thoma established Golder Thoma & Co, a company that has been credited as creating the "consolidation" or "buy and build" investment strategy. In 1984, Bryan Cressey was recruited to join the firm from First Chicago, and the firm's name was changed to Golder Thoma Cressey. With the promotion of Bruce Rauner to partner, it became Golder, Thoma, Cressey, Rauner, Inc. (GTCR).

In 1998, the firm split into two firms: GTCR Golder Rauner and Thoma Cressey Equity Partners.

In 2008, Thoma Cressey Bravo was renamed Thoma Bravo after Bryan Cressey left the company.

The firm closed its 12th fund in September 2016, with $7.6 billion. Thoma Bravo raised $12.6 billion for its 13th fund, which was announced in January 2019. It raised $17.8 billion for its 14th fund which launched in October 2020. In December 2022, it raised $24.3 billion for its 15th fund, which Preqin called the largest tech-focused buyout fund raised by an independent private-equity firm.

In 2017, the firm launched a private credit platform, which focuses on investments in software and technology companies.

The company moved its operations to Miami, Florida, at the end of 2020.

In June 2023, Private Equity International placed Thoma Bravo fourth on the PEI 300 ranking of the largest private equity firms.

In February 2024, Fortune published an analysis of the top ten private equity investors in tech of 2021 by amount invested. Thoma Bravo made the highest number of acquisitions valued at over $58 billion that year, at a time when tech valuations peaked before the market correction in 2022. Two of Thoma Bravo's most recent 14th and 15th funds were among the lowest performing funds in Fortune's list, posting an internal rate of return of 4% and −2% respectively, while the 13th fund saw some big exits and was among the highest on the list with 27%.

In June 2025, Thoma Bravo was ranked fourth on Private Equity International's PEI 300 ranking. That same month, Thoma Bravo announced the completion of fundraising for its buyout funds totaling more than $34.4 billion in fund commitments, which Private Equity International called "one of the largest buyout funds in history." This included Thoma Bravo Fund XVI, a $24.3 billion fund, Thoma Bravo Discover Fund V, an $8.1 billion fund, and the firm's first dedicated Europe Fund, with approximately €1.8 billion in capital commitments. Each fund exceeded its target.

In June 2026, Thoma Bravo lost control of customer-experience software company Medallia after a restructuring transferred ownership to a consortium led by Blackstone, Apollo Global Management, and HHR. Thoma Bravo had acquired Medallia for approximately $6.4 billion in 2021, and its roughly $5 billion equity investment was effectively wiped out in the restructuring. The new owners provided $150 million to reduce Medallia's debt.

== See also ==
- Carl and Marilynn Thoma Art Foundation
- Bravo Family Foundation
