= Electronic flight bag =

Flight Information management device

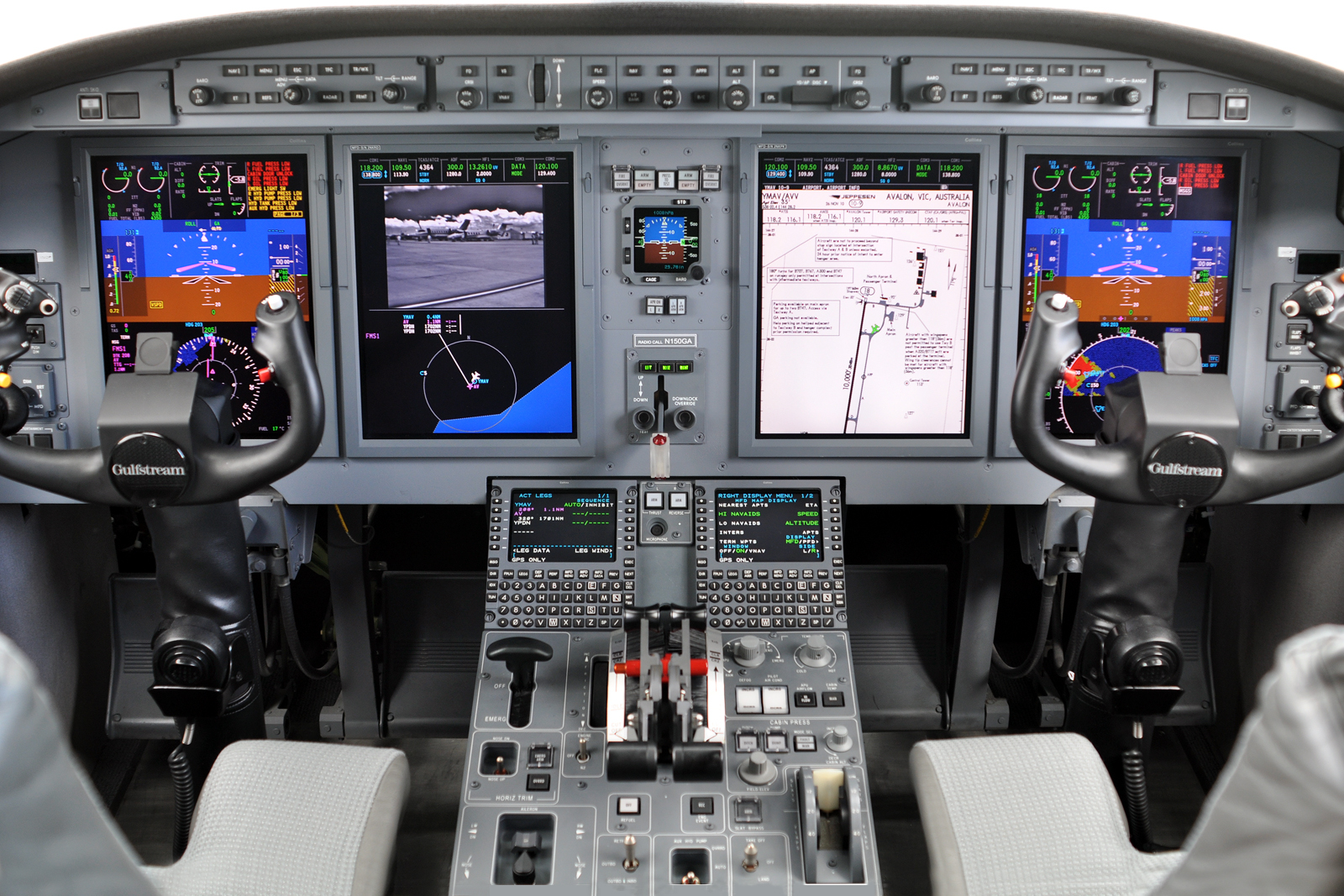
Electronic flight bag showing the airport diagram of Avalon Airport

An electronic flight bag (EFB) is an electronic information management device that helps flight crews perform flight management tasks more easily and efficiently with less paper providing the reference material often found in the pilot's carry-on flight bag, including the flight-crew operating manual, navigational charts, etc. In addition, the EFB can host purpose-built software applications to automate other functions normally conducted by hand, such as take-off performance calculations. The EFB gets its name from the traditional pilot's flight bag, which is typically a heavy (up to or over 18 kg or 40 lb) documents bag that pilots carry to the cockpit.

An EFB is intended primarily for cockpit/flightdeck or cabin use. For large and turbine aircraft, FAR 91.503 requires the presence of navigational charts on the airplane. If an operator's sole source of navigational chart information is contained on an EFB, the operator must demonstrate the EFB will continue to operate throughout a decompression event, and thereafter, regardless of altitude.

== History ==
The earliest EFB precursors came from individual pilots from FedEx in the early 1990s who used their personal laptops, referred to as Airport Performance Laptop Computers, to carry out aircraft performance calculations on the aircraft (this was a commercial off-the-shelf computer and was considered portable).

The first true EFB, designed specifically to replace a pilot's entire kit bag, was patented by Angela Masson as the Electronic Kit Bag (EKB) in 1999. In October 2003 KLM Airlines accepted the first installed EFB on a Boeing 777 aircraft. The Boeing EFB hardware was made by Astronautics Corporation of America and software applications were supplied by both Jeppesen and Boeing. In 2005, the first commercial Class 2 EFB STC was issued to Avionics Support Group, Inc. with its Constant Friction Mount (cfMount) as part of the EFB. The installation was performed on a Miami Air Boeing B737NG.

In 2009, Continental Airlines successfully completed the world’s first flight using Jeppesen Airport Surface Area Moving Map (AMM) showing “own ship” position on a Class 2 Electronic Flight Bag platform. The AMM application uses a high resolution database to dynamically render maps of the airport.

As personal computing technology became more compact and powerful, EFBs became capable of storing all the aeronautical charts for the entire world on a single three-pound (1.4 kg) computer, compared to the 80 lb (36 kg) of paper normally required for worldwide paper charts. Using EFBs can increase safety and enhance crew access to operating procedures and flight management information, and allow aircrews to calculate aircraft performance for departures and arrivals as well as aircraft weight and balance for loading-planning purposes.

The Air Force Special Operations Command (AFSOC) purchased an initial supply of over 3,000 iPad-based EFBs which were launched in December 2011. In a similar acquisition, Air Mobility Command initiated a contract for up to 18,000 iPad-based EFBs. The Air Force Special Operations Command internally developed a secure method of transferring the National Geo-Spatial Intelligence Agency's (NGA) monthly Flight Information Publications (FLIP) dataset to all its users worldwide.

After trialing cockpit iPads as EFBs in 2011, Delta Air Lines announced in August 2013 it would replace a policy allowing pilots to use personal tablets as EFBs. Delta planned to provide new certified EFBs to all of its pilots by May 2014, after FAA approval in February. Early risk of breakage to iPads used as EFBs was addressed through rugged case design. However, the purchase of iPad from AFSOC was cancelled in February 2012 due to security concerns, where Russian-made software procurement issues may cause potential risks to expose end users.

EFBs were initially divided into a number of hardware classes and software types.

Legacy EFB hardware classes were:

- Class 1 – Standard commercial-off-the-shelf (COTS) equipment such as laptops or handheld electronic devices. These devices are used as loose equipment and are typically stowed during critical phases of flight (below 10,000 feet). A Class 1 EFB is considered a Portable Electronic Device (PED). Class 1 EFBs, such as Cockpit iPads, may be used to display Type B applications in critical phases of flight provided that they are 'secured and viewable'.
- Class 2 – Portable Electronic Devices, and range from modified COTS equipment to purpose-built devices. Mounting, power (ship's power as primary) or data connectivity of an EFB typically requires the application of an STC, Type Certificate or Amended Type Certificate. (ref: FAA Order 8900.1)
- Class 3 – Considered "installed equipment" and subject to airworthiness requirements and, unlike PEDs, they must be under design control. The hardware is subject to a limited number of RTCA DO-160E requirements (for non-essential equipment—typical crash safety and Conducted and Radiated Emissions testing). Class 3 EFBs are typically installed under STC or other airworthiness approval.

EFB may host a wide array of applications, initially categorized in three software categories.

- Type A
  - Static applications, such as document viewer (PDF, HTML, and XML formats);
  - Flight Crew Operating Manuals, and other printed documents like airport NOTAM;
- Type B
  - Static or dynamic electronic "charts" to include (though not requiring) panning, zooming, and scrolling;(AC120-76(), Appendix B)
- Type C
  - use as a Multi-function display (MFD); in at least one case as part of an Automatic Dependent Surveillance-Broadcast system. Type C applications must run only on Class 3 EFB.

Type C applications were considered as subject to airworthiness requirements and as such must be developed in conformance with DO-178/ED-12 objectives and run on Class 3 EFB.

== Design features ==
Currently, EFBs categorized as "Portable" (PEDs) or "Installed".[19] Portable can be considered to consolidate the previous Class 1 and 2 distinctions, while Installed is equivalent to legacy Class 3. These simplifications made to reduce confusion and to harmonize with already-released EASA and ICAO guidance.

Many contemporary electronic flight bags are implemented as mobile applications running on tablet computers and smartphones, synchronised through cloud services and integrated with operator dispatch systems. These applications typically combine aeronautical charts, performance calculations, aircraft weight and balance, NOTAM and weather information, and may be connected to panel-mounted avionics or portable GPS receivers to display moving-map position and georeferenced procedures.

With release of AC 120-76D in 2017, references to Type C applications were removed, and such functionality is no longer an EFB functions.[20]

Carrying a 40+ pound kitbag that holds all of the navigation charts is a cause of personal injuries of the pilots themselves. According to Patrick O’Keeffe, American Airlines’s vice president of Airline Operations Technology, “[iPads used as EFBs have] reduced the single biggest source of pilot injuries: carrying those packs.”

== Cockpit iPad ==
Cockpit iPads are iPads used in the aviation industry as part of an EFB. Early in 2011, the FAA authorized charter company Executive Jet Management to use iPad records without the backup paper charts. This helped make way for the iPad to become an aviation instrument for the rest of the industry. Alaska Airlines, Delta Air Lines, and American Airlines planned test programs.

The main motive to use the iPad as a navigation tool is the practicality of the product. The iPad would replace about 25 pounds (11 kg) of paper charts used by pilots that include aircraft flight manuals, approach plate, navigation charts, policy manuals, minimum equipment list and taxi charts. Major airlines based in the United States are mainly paper based, which includes some who have fleets of 900 plus planes. This translates to a lot of paper in the form of charts that could be saved by the iPad. The switch to an electronic system would also make life easier on the pilot. No longer would pilots carry around a heavy flight bag. It would be replaced by the much lighter, more compact tablet. When used in conjunction with a specially designed strap, this small size allows them to be used in place of kneeboards. Flight planning is also made easier by the iPad. The pilot would be able to use one device to check everything from the weather to other airport facilities and flight plans. All this makes a pilot's life a lot easier.

A number of potential issues have been brought up including distractions in the cockpit, but the iPads are prohibited from being used for non-flight purposes and pilots are still using onboard GPS instruments. Other potential safety issues included application failure and system failure, but in the three-month test Executive Jet Management conducted, not once did the application shut off or have a failure. Tests did show that if a failure did take place, the program could reboot in four to six seconds. Extra iPads in the cockpit are also being talked about as a backup to a system failure. Airlines are also looking into the safety of the placement of the iPads in the cockpit. The most popular placement is on a pilot's kneeboard, a strap that connects to the pilot's upper thigh and makes the device hands free, but many commercial airlines are looking into a dock that is connected to the plane itself.

== Regulations ==
=== United States Federal Aviation Administration ===
While FAR Part 91 Operators (those not flying for hire, including private and corporate operators) can use their pilot-in-command authority to approve the use of EFBs which are PEDs, operator with OpSpecs (Part 135, Part 121) must seek operational approval through the OpSpecs process based on the following requirements:

- PEDs used as EFB configuration must meet the rapid decompression testing requirements of standard RTCA DO-160E.
- Any mounting or attachment or data connectivity of PEDs used as EFB to aircraft systems shall be performed in accordance with an approved data (such as Supplemental Type Certificate, Type Certificate or Amended Type Certificate).

=== European Aviation Safety Agency ===
For guidance on airworthiness and operational considerations for Electronic Flight Bags (EFB) for operators within Europe, EASA AMC 20-25 applies.

=== United Kingdom Military Aviation Authority ===
The UK Ministry of Defence takes the approach of clearing the airworthiness of EFB on specific aircraft types as 'Equipment Not Basic to Air System (ENBAS)' as described in Regulatory Article 1340. The Type Airworthiness Authority (TAA) and supporting Delivery Teams are responsible for this clearance to ensure that the EFB device in and of itself does not negatively impact the airworthiness of the aircraft in question. Regarding the approval of use of specific applications, this is the responsibility of the Aviation Duty Holder (ADH) chain.

== See also ==
- Index of aviation articles
- Moving map display
- Quick Reference Handbook (QRH)
- Flight Management System (FMS)
- ForeFlight
