= ForeFlight =

Electronic flight bag for pilots

- Platform: iOS, iPadOS, Web
- Website: foreflight.com

ForeFlight is an electronic flight bag for iOS and iPadOS devices designed to assist pilots and corporate flight departments with flight planning. It includes information about facilities such as airports, NAVAIDs, and air traffic control facilities. It also aids pilots in tasks including flight planning, weather monitoring, and document management, as well as an electronic logbook to help pilots record flight time. The United States, Canada, and Europe are supported regions. The company was founded in 2007 and has since been purchased by the private equity firm Thoma Bravo.

== Overview ==
The app provides airport information such as chart supplement entries, taxi diagrams, instrument approach plates, departure and arrival procedures, and both temporary and permanent NOTAMs. It also provides weather reports and forecasts for the airport or, if no reports are available, nearby airports. It also makes it possible to search for airports, procedure diagrams, or regulatory aspects of these procedures.

The app also supports a wide range of general and business aviation aircraft to allow pilots to assess performance in both hypothetical and real-time conditions. Examples include calculating weight and balance figures and runway performance. ForeFlight Runway Analysis, a subfeature of the app, allows pilots to judge runway length and weather conditions to determine necessary takeoff and landing distances.

ForeFlight provides access to maps and navigation charts. The app supports flight planning features including letting pilots select routes based on IFR waypoints or using waypoints, checkpoints, or geographic features for VFR flight. Pilots can factor instrument departure, arrival, and approach procedures into their route as well as traffic pattern entries to airports. ForeFlight will calculate metrics such as distance, time en route and to each waypoint, true and magnetic courses, and fuel burn considering current weather conditions and aircraft profiles entered by the user. ForeFlight also makes it possible to receive pre-departure clearances through the app.

Enroute weather is also available in the app. Official current reports and forecast information from the National Weather Service is provided in both textual and graphical formats. The app provides approved weather briefings. The briefings include information relative to a pilot's flight and are timestamped and stored. The aircraft tail number is also recorded to ensure that the briefing is considered legally valid.

ForeFlight also displays information about airspace and special use airspace. It displays information about the locations, operating hours, dimensions, and more of uncontrolled and controlled airspaces, airspaces designated for airports, and special airspaces such as Temporary Flight Restrictions.

== History ==
In 2016, the app helped to develop a self-service flight planning system for drones to allow schedulers, dispatchers, and flight crews to plan each aspect of flight.

The app began offering to Jeppesen Charts in 2017 during a partnership with Boeing, who purchased ForeFlight in 2019.

In the 2020s, ForeFlight began rapidly expanding its business aviation offerings, adding new supported aircraft and trying to convince flight departments to change to their software. The company also manages a service called ForeFlight Dispatch to encourage collaborative flight planning.

In November 2022, the app faced a "cyber incident" that caused the outage of its NOTAM system. The app was unable to add new NOTAMs to its system.

ForeFlight is partnered with flight tracking service FlightAware to provide real-time flight tracking and automatically display the filed routes of aircraft on IFR flight plans. This service is provided over Wi-Fi, and pilots in-flight need external ADS-B receivers to see traffic.

In 2024, ForeFlight developed an app for the Apple Vision Pro to allow users to explore airports in three dimensions.

In 2025, Boeing divested its ownership of ForeFlight, selling it to the private equity firm Thoma Bravo.

== See also ==
- Index of aviation articles
- Moving map display
