= Orlando Bravo =

Puerto Rican billionaire businessman (born 1970)

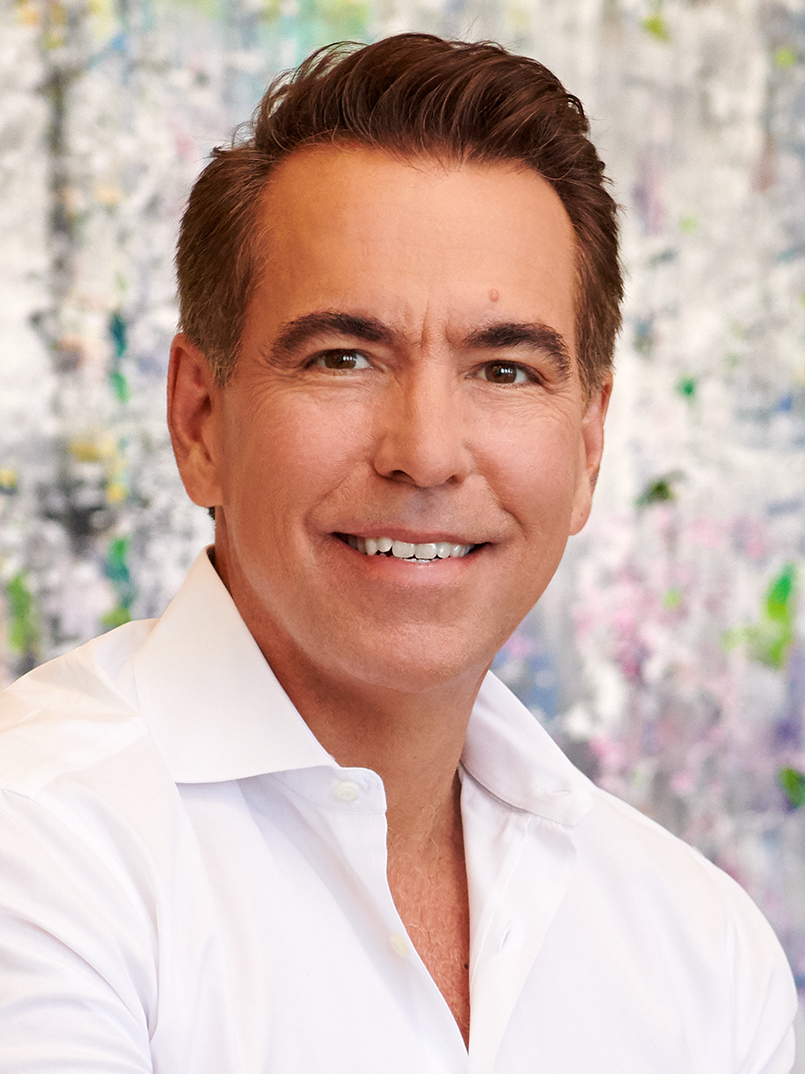
- Bravo in 2021
- Born: 1970 (age 55–56); Mayagüez, Puerto Rico
- Education: Brown University (BA); Stanford University (JD, MBA)
- Known for: Co-founder and managing partner, Thoma Bravo
- Spouse: Katy Bravo
- Children: 4

Orlando Bravo (born 1970) is a Puerto Rican billionaire businessman. He is the co-founder and managing partner of Thoma Bravo, a private equity investment firm that specializes in enterprise software and technology-enabled services sectors. The 2019 Forbes 400 listed Bravo as the first Puerto Rican-born billionaire, debuting at No. 287. As of August 2025, his net worth is estimated at US$12.8 billion.

== Early life and education ==
Bravo was born in Mayagüez, Puerto Rico. When Bravo was in his early teens he moved to Florida to pursue a possible career in tennis, studying at the Nick Bollettieri Tennis Academy, which counts Andre Agassi and Maria Sharapova as alumni. He returned to Puerto Rico to attend high school at the Academia de la Inmaculada Concepción in his hometown. In 1987 he competed in the Omega Easter Bowl tennis tournament held in Miami. After graduating high school Bravo left Puerto Rico to attend Brown University, where he graduated with a B.A. in economics and political science in 1992. Bravo enrolled in graduate school at Stanford University, earning a J.D. from Stanford Law School and an M.B.A. from Stanford's Graduate School of Business.

== Career ==
Bravo began his professional career working in mergers and acquisitions for Morgan Stanley. In 1997, he joined Thoma Bravo's predecessor firm, Thoma Cressey Equity Partners, Inc. (TCEP.) Crain's Chicago Business called Carl Thoma's hiring of Bravo "the smartest investment....Thoma ever made."

In the early 2000s Carl Thoma, a co-founder of the firm, allowed Bravo to lead the acquisition of product distribution software provider Prophet 21. It was the first software deal TCEP had ever done, and one of the earliest take-private transactions in the sector. At the time, Bravo noted it fit TCEP's strategy of buying strong franchises in large and fragmented industries. Because the deal happened when lenders were hesitant to provide capital for such deals, the deal took place with almost no dependence on leverage. Bravo brought in the firm's first operating partner to address the issue of the software companies' running on high gross margins with the potential of decent profitability, but were instead often losing money. After three years Prophet 21 produced a return of 4.7x at exit.

This and other deals led Bravo to become a partner at TCEP, when he was 30 years old. At that time he ran the software group at the company.

TCEP became Thoma Cressey Bravo in 2007, in recognition of Bravo's contribution to the firm's success.

In 2008, Orlando Bravo helped form Thoma Bravo, LLC, when the firm changed its name and investment focus.

In September 2017, in the days and weeks after Hurricane Maria hit Puerto Rico, Bravo traveled to the island and coordinated the shipment of supplies via private jet, cargo planes and container ships. In 2019, Bravo committed $100 million to the Bravo Family Foundation's Rising Entrepreneurs Program with the goal of fostering entrepreneurship on the island.

=== Board Memberships ===
Bravo served as a trustee on the Brown University Corporation from 2019-2023. In 2019, Brown University founded the Orlando Bravo Center for Economics Research to support "innovative research, collaboration and training" for faculty and students in the Department of Economics. Bravo is a member of the Board of Trustees at Memorial Sloan Kettering Cancer Center.

== Personal life ==
Bravo, his wife, Katy Bravo, and their four children live in Miami, Florida.

== See also ==
- List of Puerto Ricans
