= Jeppesen =

American company

- Type: Subsidiary
- Industry: Aerospace
- Founded: 1934; 92 years ago
- Founder: Elrey Borge Jeppesen; Nadine Jeppesen
- Headquarters: Inverness, Colorado, United States
- Number of employees: 3,200
- Parent: Thoma Bravo
- Website: www.jeppesen.com

Jeppesen (also known as Jeppesen Sanderson) is an American company offering navigational information, operations planning tools, flight planning products and software. Jeppesen's aeronautical navigation charts are often called "Jepp charts" or simply "Jepps" by pilots, due to the charts' popularity. This popularity extends to electronic charts, which are increasingly favored over paper charts by pilots and mariners as mobile computing devices, electronic flight bags, integrated electronic bridge systems and other display devices become more common and readily available.

Jeppesen is headquartered in Inverness, Colorado, a census-designated place in Arapahoe County. The postal designation of Englewood is used in the company's mailing address. Jeppesen has offices in locations around the world, including Neu-Isenburg (Germany), Massa (Italy), Crawley (United Kingdom), Gothenburg (Sweden), Canberra (Australia) and Gdańsk (Poland). The company employs approximately 3,200 people.

== History ==
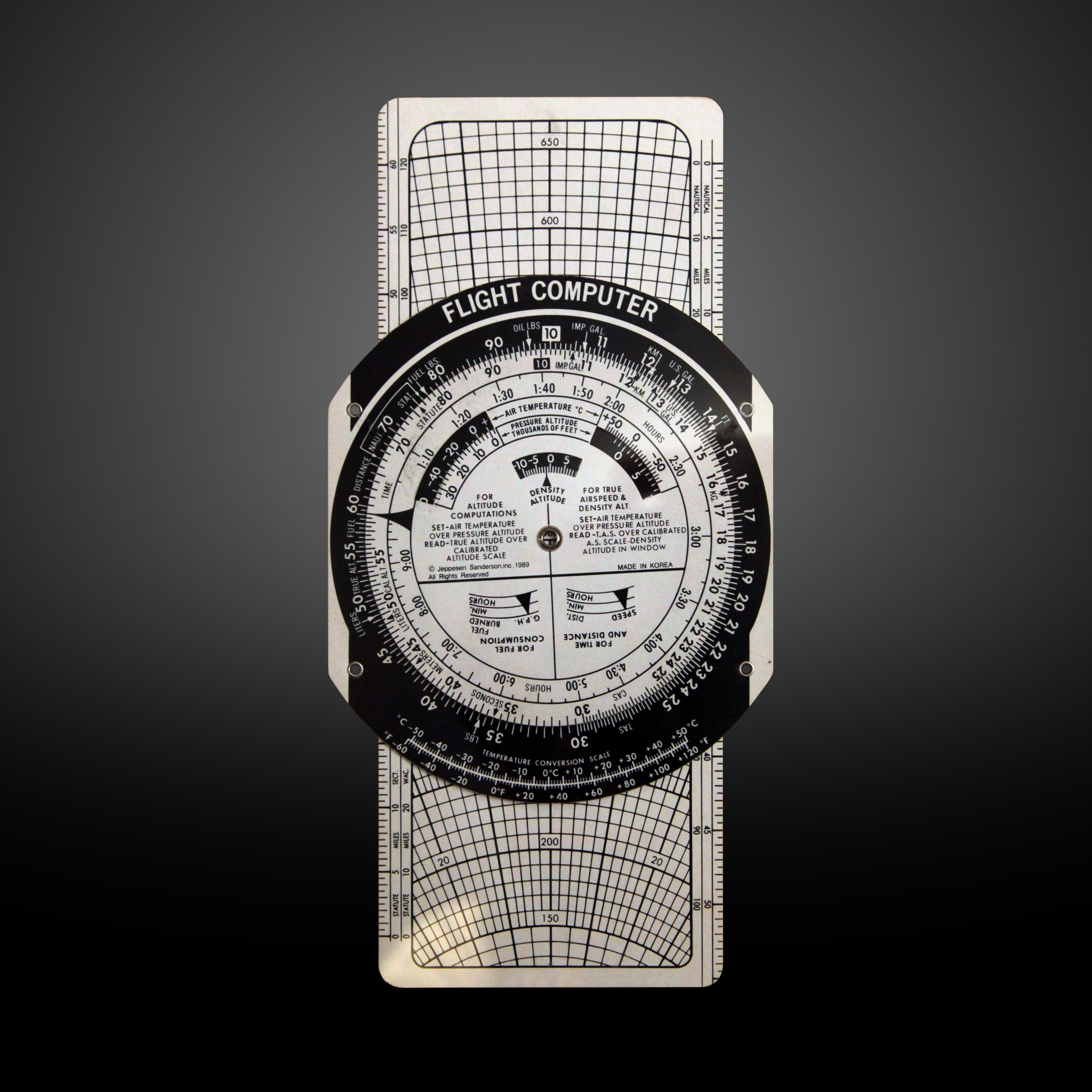
A Jeppesen Sanderson flight computer, on display at the MIT Museum.

The company was founded in 1934 by Elrey Borge Jeppesen, a pilot working for Varney Air Lines, who was the first to make aeronautical charts for pilots to navigate in flight. The information that he collected and the charts that he drew were at first only for personal use, but fellow pilots quickly saw the benefits of using these charts, and Jeppesen started selling copies of his chart book for $10. Other pilots started to collect data on their own routes and gave it to Jeppesen for him to include in his navigation book. Jeppesen's wife, former flight attendant Nadine Jeppesen, was also important to the company's early years.

United Airlines, the airline for which Jeppesen worked in the late 1930s, was one of the first airlines to start using Jeppesen's charts. After a while, the chart business started taking up so much of Jeppesen's time that he quit his job as a captain and focused his energy on making charts.

The terminal at the then-under-construction Denver International Airport was named in honor of Jeppesen in February 1991.

1940s

In 1941, Jeppesen moved the company from Salt Lake City, Utah, to Denver, Colorado.

In 1947, Jeppesen and the Civil Aeronautics Administration (CAA) collaborated to introduce standard instrument approach procedures and to establish the National Flight Data Center.

1957, Jeppesen expanded to Europe by opening an office in Frankfurt, Germany to provide services to customers in Europe and beyond.

1961, The company was purchased by the Times-Mirror Company (parent company of the Los Angeles Times).

1970s

In 1973, Jeppesen NavData® was first used commercially in flight management computer guidance systems (FMCGS).

In 1974, Jeppesen entered the flight training business when Times-Mirror merged it with Sanderson Films.

1980s

Jeppesen began a series of acquisitions that added to its product and service offerings:

- Bottlang Airfield Manual added visual flight rules (VFR) approach and airport information for Europe;
- Icarus, which became OpsData, added runway and performance analysis, used to plan and optimize aircraft takeoff and landing performance.

In 1989, Jeppesen purchased Lockheed DataPlan, a flight planning and weather services company.

=== 1990s ===
Between 1990 and 1995, Jeppesen expanded globally by opening offices in Australia and China to serve customers in the Asia-Pacific region, and continued to expand through acquisition by purchasing TannGuide, which became the JeppGuide airport directory; Aircraft Performance Unlimited (APU), which became part of OpsData; and International Aviation Publishers, which created aviation maintenance training manuals;

In 1996, Jeppesen introduced JeppView, which provided a complete, worldwide library of terminal aeronautical charts on CD-ROM;

In 1996, Jeppesen acquired MentorPlus, a maker of PC-based aviation and marine moving map and flight planning applications;

In 1998 Jeppesen introduced Internet-based delivery of NavData updates.

=== 2000s ===
In 2000, Jeppesen purchased Nobeltec, Inc., a Portland, Oregon-based company that provides marine navigation software and charts;

In 2000, Jeppesen was acquired by The Boeing Company. Boeing bought Jeppesen from the Tribune Company, which had acquired Times-Mirror and was selling off its non-core assets;

In 2002, Jeppesen's first commercial electronic flight bag and Internet-based chart delivery were introduced;

In 2003, Jeppesen became the first commercial organization to be certified by the Federal Aviation Administration as a Qualified Internet Communications Provider (QICP);

In 2004, Jeppesen acquired SBS International, a New York City-based provider of crew scheduling services. Jeppesen acquired SBS through an arrangement with Boeing, which had purchased SBS in 2001;

In 2006, Jeppesen purchased Carmen Systems, a provider of crew scheduling and disruption management software. The company was headquartered in Gothenburg, Sweden, and had some 300 employees. Jeppesen quickly consolidated Carmen and SBS product offerings and locations;

In 2007, Jeppesen purchased C-MAP, a provider of digital maritime cartography, data services and other navigational information. C-MAP became part of Jeppesen's marine division. It has operations in Italy, the United Kingdom, Norway, Greece, Poland, Russia, India, Japan, South Korea, Singapore, Malaysia, Australia and the United States;

In 2008, Jeppesen purchased Ocean Systems, Inc., an Alameda, California-based provider of vessel and voyage optimization solutions for commercial marine operations;

In 2008, Jeppesen received FAA approval for its Airport Moving Map application for Class 2 electronic flight bags;

In 2009, Jeppesen received FAA approval to design and validate required navigation performance (RNP) procedures in the United States;

In 2009, Jeppesen sold its Nobeltec product line to Signet USA.

=== 2010s ===
In 2010, Jeppesen received approval from the Civil Aviation Safety Authority of Australia to design, validate and maintain both required navigation performance and conventional instrument approach procedures;

In 2010, Jeppesen was named the 2010 INFORMS Prize winner for its organization-wide use of operations research.

In 2012, Jeppesen-designed arrival procedures are rolled out for Denver International Airport.

In 2013, Jeppesen introduces Mobile FlightDeck VFR for general aviation pilots.

In 2013, Jeppesen concludes sale of journey planning business to SilverRail Technologies.

In 2014, Jeppesen rolls out FliteDeck Pro for Windows 8.

In 2016, Jeppesen sold its Marine Division to Digital Marine Solutions. This includes the C-Map brand name and all products and services. This effectively ends Jeppesen's investment in the Marine Industry.

In 2017, Jeppesen announced an alliance with ForeFlight to integrate electronic Jeppesen charts with ForeFlight Mobile, a leading electronic flight bag application.

=== 2020s ===
In late 2022, Jeppesen was one of two Boeing subsidiaries affected by a cyber attack. Jeppesen's services were down for 8 days.

In April 2025, Jeppesen was sold to the private equity firm Thoma Bravo.

== Alleged involvement with CIA extraordinary rendition flights ==
On October 23, 2006, The New Yorker reported that Jeppesen handled the logistical planning for the CIA's extraordinary rendition flights. The allegation was based on information from an ex-employee who quoted Bob Overby, the company's managing director, as saying, "We do all of the extraordinary rendition flights—you know, the torture flights. Let's face it, some of these flights end up that way. It certainly pays well." The article went on to suggest that this may make Jeppesen a potential defendant in a lawsuit by Khalid El-Masri.

Jeppesen was named as a defendant in a lawsuit filed by the American Civil Liberties Union (ACLU) on May 30, 2007, on behalf of several others who were allegedly subject to extraordinary rendition. The suit was dismissed in February 2008 on a motion from the United States government on the basis that proceeding with the case would reveal state secrets and endanger relations with other nations that had cooperated.

On May 16, 2011, the Supreme Court declined to review the decision of the Ninth Circuit to dismiss the case.

== Other flight support providers ==
- Air Routing International
- Lufthansa Systems
- Universal Weather and Aviation
- Navblue
