= Everbridge =

American enterprise software company

Everbridge, Inc.
- Formerly: 3n Global, Inc. (2002–2009)
- Type: Private
- Traded as: Nasdaq: EVBG
- Industry: Enterprise software
- Founded: 2002; 24 years ago
- Headquarters: Burlington, Massachusetts, U.S.
- Area served: Worldwide
- Key people: David Wagner (CEO)
- Products: Critical Event Management; Mass Notification; Safety Connection; Public Warning; IT alerting Smart Security; Travel Protector xMatters; SnapComms; RedSky
- Revenue: ▲US$449 million (2023)
- Owner: Thoma Bravo
- Number of employees: 1,593 (2023)
- Website: everbridge.com

Everbridge, Inc. is an American enterprise software company that offers applications which provide information about critical events to help with personal safety and business continuity. Formerly known as 3n Global and the National Notification Network, Everbridge began operations in 2002. In an emergency, Everbridge sends messages via telephone, text message and email, but stop once they know that a person has read a message. An app allows emergency managers to track geotagged tweets that contain specific hashtags and use this information to respond to incidents as they occur.

Their system was used in 2012 to send over 10 million messages to residents during Hurricane Sandy. During the Boston Marathon bombings in April 2013, the city of Boston used Everbridge for its critical communications. Everbridge relayed information to business operators, employees, firefighters, hospital staff, police and residents after the explosions and during the lockdown of Boston, Watertown, Waltham and surrounding areas. It was also used during the COVID-19 pandemic to provide updates to Boston residents.

In 2016, Everbridge raised $90 million in an Initial public offering, becoming a publicly traded company (EVBG) on the Nasdaq stock exchange. In 2017, its revenues totaled $104 million. Three years later, that figure rose to $271 million. In 2024, the company was taken private by Thoma Bravo.

The company's customers include the University of Mississippi, the U.S. Army, West Virginia, Hartsfield-Jackson Atlanta International Airport, and the countries of Norway, Peru, and Australia.

== History ==
Formerly known as 3n Global, a wholly owned subsidiary of the National Notification Network, the company was founded in 2002 in response to the September 11 attacks to assist with crisis coordination. It changed its name to Everbridge in April 2009.

In addition, Everbridge has been used to alert residents and first responders during Hurricanes Sandy and Dorian.

The company saw an increase in users during the COVID-19 pandemic.

Everbridge products rely on sources such as threat data, social media, traffic cameras, and 9-1-1 data.

Private equity firm Thoma Bravo agreed to acquire Everbridge for approximately $1.8 billion in March 2024. Thoma Bravo's offer of $1.5 billion a month earlier was increased since Everbridge said it received a better offer during the 25-day "go-shop" period. The acquisition closed in July 2024.

=== Acquisitions ===
The following is a list of acquisitions by Everbridge:

- Nixle (2015)
- IDV Solutions (2017)
- Svensk Krisledning AB (2017)
- Unified Messaging Systems (2018)
- NC4 (2019)
- one2many (2020)
- Techwan SA (2020)
- SnapComms (2020)
- xMatters (2021)
- RedSky Technologies (2021)
- Anvil (2022)

== Leadership ==
The four founding partners of Everbridge are: Cinta Putra, Steve Kirchmeier, Patrick Stuver, and James Keene.

Current Leadership: Everbridge is led by David Wagner as new CEO, successor to David Meredith. Other notable executives include Chief Product Officer Bryan Barney, Chief Information Officer Shiela Carpenter, Chief Security Officer Pamela Larson, and Chief Technology Officer Imad Mouline.

== See also ==
- Emergency management
