= Universal Weather and Aviation =

American Aviation Company

Universal Weather and Aviation, Inc.
- Company type: Privately held company
- Industry: Business aviation
- Founded: 1959
- Founder: Tom Evans
- Headquarters: Houston, Texas, United States
- Key people: Ralph Vasami (CEO); Greg Evans (Chairman)
- Services: Flight planning, aviation weather, aircraft ground handling, and aviation security
- Owner: Greg Evans
- Number of employees: 700
- Website: universalweather.com

Universal Weather and Aviation, Inc. (commonly called Universal or Universal Weather) is a privately held company headquartered in Houston, Texas that provides products and services for the general aviation industry. Its customers include owners and operators of business jets for corporate and personal air travel. The company offers products and services including international flight planning and scheduling, weather briefings, aircraft ground handling, and aviation security. It is the oldest company in the corporate flight planning industry.

Universal Weather was founded in 1959 by Tom Evans. Greg Evans, his son, is Universal Weather's chairman and owner. Ralph Vasami serves as the company's chief executive officer. The company operated in 50+ locations in 20 countries as of 2015.

== History ==
Universal Weather was founded in Dallas, Texas in 1959 by Tom Evans, a former United States Air Force officer and meteorologist. Universal Weather was originally based out of Dallas Love Field in Dallas, Texas and was the first company to provide customized weather forecasting for business aviation. The company moved to Houston, Texas a year later. For its first ten years Universal Weather was only involved in weather forecasting. New services were added gradually as the business aviation industry grew.

Greg Evans, son of founder Tom Evans, became company president and chief executive officer in 2001. He had worked at the company for the previous 22 years and was responsible for the company's prior expansion into Europe and Asia. Ralph Vasami became president of the company in 2004. Vasami had worked at Universal Weather since he had interned at the company's New York City weather office and had most recently served as its chief operating officer. He would later become chief executive officer of the company.

In 2007, Universal Weather donated flight planning and weather to Barrington Irving's then-world record solo flight around the world. Universal Weather's services assisted in preparing Irving before his trip as the youngest person to fly solo around the world, and also monitored his travels during the expedition, tracking his location and storms, and coordinating with foreign airports for permission to land.

Universal Weather acquired Air Chef Holdings, an American in-flight catering and concierge firm, in 2011. The company launched its mobile application, Universal Mobile, for free in 2012, later updating it to be current with industry trends and making it accessible for iPads.

In 2014, Universal Weather assisted Irving again providing complete flight logistics to Irving's Flying Classroom endeavor, a nine-week program of aviation expedition and education spanning over three continents. The program also involves scheduled informational stops to Universal Weather's ground support locations.

In 2020, Universal Weather sold its UVair fuelling division to Word Fuel Services.

== Company brands ==
Universal Weather and Aviation Inc. owns and operates two brands that specialize in various services related to the aviation transport industry:

=== Universal Aviation ===
Universal Aviation is the ground support division of Universal Weather. Universal Weather opened its first ground handling offices in the mid-1970s in Mexico and Spain. In the late 1990s, Universal Weather began opening a network of ground handling offices. By 2016, the brand operates over 50 locations in 20 countries.

=== Air Culinaire Worldwide ===
Air Culinaire Worldwide is the in-flight catering provider owned by Universal Weather. The culinary brand operates 21 catering kitchens around the world.

== Memberships and affiliations ==
- National Business Aviation Association, Inc. (NBAA)
- European Business Aviation Association (EBAA)
- Middle East Business Aviation Association (MEBAA)
- Asian Business Aviation Association (AsBAA)
