= Pilot's kneeboard =

Aviation accessory

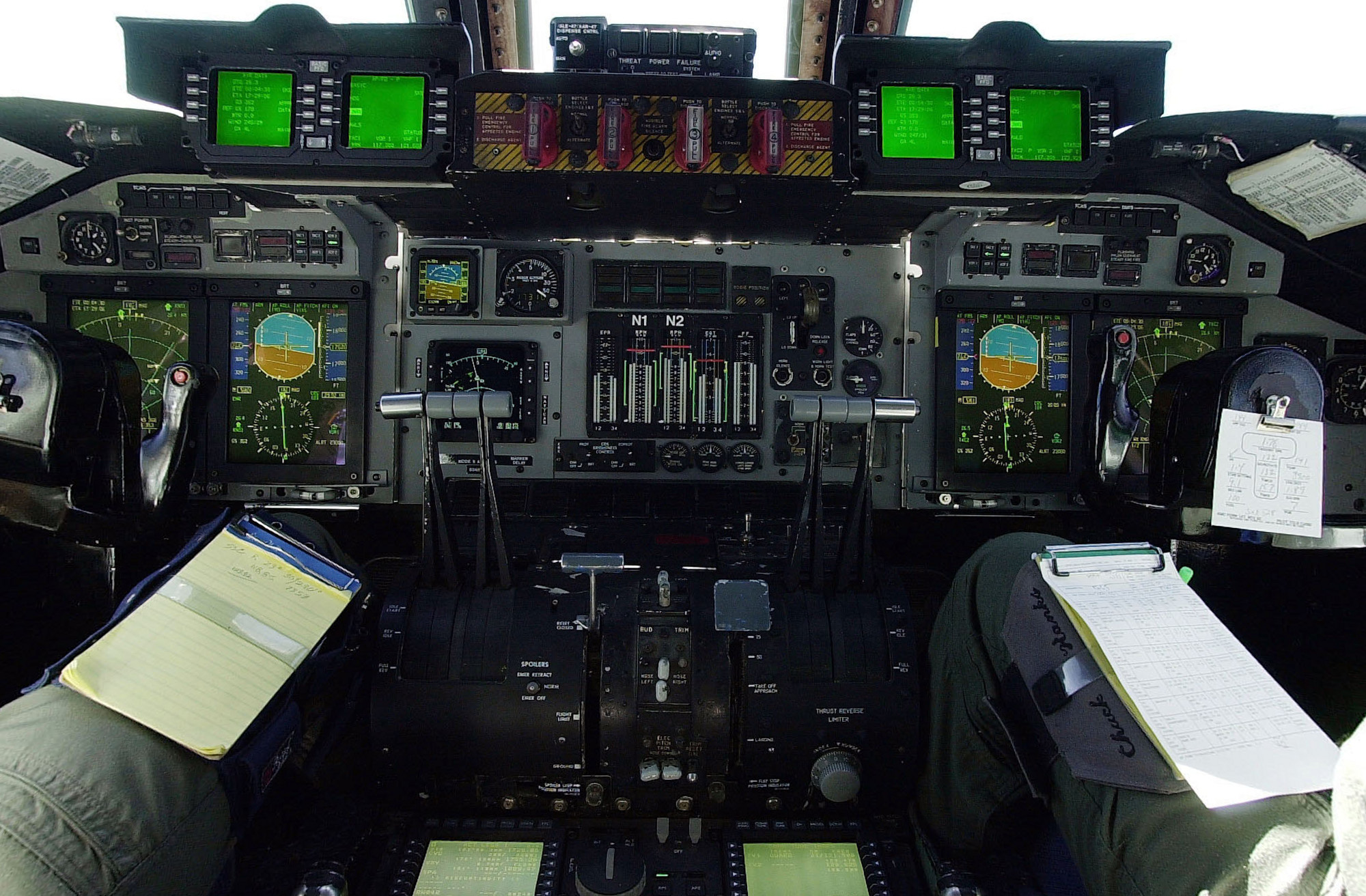
Two pilots wearing kneeboards in the cockpit of a Lockheed C-141 Starlifter

A kneeboard is an accessory (usually made from cloth, plastic or metal) with various types of clips or mounts to hold objects for pilots during flight.

While their dimensions, material and specifics vary from model to model, a kneeboard, by definition, includes the following components:

- flat plate, approximately 4 to 6 inches in width, 8 to 11 inches in length.
- an elastic strap, attached to the plate, to hold fast to the pilot's upper thigh.
- a binder clip, mounted to the plate, for holding items.

Models vary from a small clipboard with thigh straps to more elaborate designs with multiple panels that fold much like a wallet (usually with a means to hold the folded board closed such as a snap or velcro.) As the kneeboard is designed to keep flight-pertinent information close at hand, it may have charts and information (such as IFR references) printed directly on it, or include pockets and clips to hold maps, approach plates, and aids to calculation such as the E6-B flight computer. The popularity of cockpit iPads has necessitated kneeboards designed to hold tablets.

== See also ==
- Lap desk
