= Index of aviation articles =

Aviation is the design, development, production, operation, and use of aircraft, especially heavier-than-air aircraft. Articles related to aviation include:

== A ==
Aviation accidents and incidents – Above Mean Sea Level (AMSL) – ADF – Accessory drive – Advance airfield – Advanced air mobility – Advanced technology engine – Adverse yaw – Aerial ramming – Aerial reconnaissance – Aerobatics – Aerodrome – Aerodrome mapping database (AMDB) – Aerodynamics – Aerofoil – Aerodrome beacon – Aeronautical Information Manual (AIM) – Aeronautical chart – Aeronautical Message Handling System – Aeronautical phraseology – Aeronautics – Aeronaval – Aerospace – Aerospace engineering – Afterburner – Agile Combat Employment (ACE) – Aileron – Air charter – Air defense identification zone (ADIZ) – Air freight terminal – Air traffic flow management – Air-augmented rocket – Airband – Airbase (AFB) – Airborne collision avoidance system – Airborne lifeboat – Air combat maneuvering (ACM) – Aircraft approach category – Aircraft canopy – Aircraft flight dynamics – Aircraft maintenance engineer (AME) – Aircraft maintenance technician (AMT) – Aircraft registration – Aircraft – Aircraft catapult – Aircraft engine controls – Aircraft fairing – Aircraft lavatory – Aircraft marshalling – Aircraft noise – Aircraft ordnance – Aircraft periscope – Air data boom – Airfoil – Airline transport pilot license – Airline – Airliner – Airmiss – Air navigation – Air observation post – Airport/Facility Directory (A/FD) – Airpark – Airport - Airports Commission – Aviation safety – Air route – Airship – Airshow – Airspace classes – Airspeed – Airspeed indicator – Air-start system – Air traffic control – Air traffic controllers' strike of 1981 – Air-to-ground communication – Air turborocket – All-Weather Airfield – Altimeter – Altiport – Altitude – Angel Flight – Angle of attack – Angle of incidence – Anhedral – Anti-collision light – Anti-torque pedals (helicopter rudder pedals) – Arresting gear – Aspect ratio (wing) – Assisted take-off – Asymmetrical aircraft – Astrodome – Attitude indicator – Autoflare – Autoland – Automatic Carrier Landing System (ACLS) – Automatic dependent surveillance – broadcast – Automatic terminal information service (ATIS) – Autorotation (helicopter) – Autorotation (fixed-wing aircraft) – Autopilot – Autothrottle – Aviation – Aviation archaeology – Aviation communication – Aviation history – Aviation light signals – Aviation medical examiner (AME) – Aviation parts tag – Aviation safety – Aviation system – Aviator – Aviator call sign – Avionics – Auxiliary power unit

== B ==
Balloon (aircraft) – Ballute – Basic fighter maneuvers (BFM) – Bird strike – Blast pad – Blimp – Blown flap – Blow-in door – Blue ice – Bolter – Boundary layer – Brevity code – Brodie landing system – Bubble canopy – Bush plane – Bypass ratio – Bypass turbojet

== C ==
Canard – Carrier-based aircraft – Carrier onboard delivery (COD) – Catapult hook – Centre of gravity (CG) – Chine – Chord – Chosen instrument – Circuit (airfield) – Circulation control wing (CCW) – Civil Air Patrol (US Air Force Auxiliary) – Civil Aviation Authority (CAA) – Clear-air turbulence – Cloaking device – Cockpit – Cockpit culture – Cockpit voice recorder – Coefficient of lift – Coefficient of moment – Cold temperature airport – Collective – Commercial pilot license – Common-use self-service (CUSS) – Compass – Compression lift – Compressor stall – Constant speed drive (CSD) – Contour flying – Controlled airspace – CVFR – Convergent Exhaust Nozzle Control (CENC) – Convertiplane – Cowling – Crab landing – Crash position indicator – Cross control – Cruise – CTAF – Cyclic

== D ==
Deep stall – Delta wing – Dihedral – Dilbert Dunker – Dissymmetry of lift – Distance measuring equipment (DME) – Distributed propulsion – Downwash – Drag – Drag curve – Drag-reducing aerospike – Dream Airplanes – Drop tank – Drogue parachute – Drop zone – Dual control – Ducted fan – Dutch roll

== E ==
Elevator – Elevon – Emergency locator beacon – Emergency locator transmitter ELT – Empennage (tail section) – Endless runway – Enhanced flight vision system (EFVS/EVS) – Escape pod – ETOPS – Exhaust mixer – Exoskeletal engine (ESE) – Experimental aircraft – External vision system (XVS) – Eurocontrol (European Organisation for the Safety of Air Navigation) – Empty weight – Environmental and climate impacts of aviation – Exint pod

== F ==
Fail-safe – Federal Aviation Administration (FAA – US authority) – Ferri scoop – Ferry flying – Ferry range – Fixed-base operator – Flame damper – Flame holder – Flameout – Flap – Flapback – Flap position indicator (FPI) – Flight – Flight computer – Flight control surfaces – Flight data recorder – Flight deck – Flight envelope protection – Flight helmet – Flight information region – Flight instruments – Flight length – Flight level – Flight management system (FMS) – Flight plan – Flight planning – Flight simulator – Flight test – Flight training – Flight time – Floating airport – Forward-looking infrared (FLIR) – Fly-by-wire (FBW) – Flying – Flying car – Flying families – Fly-in – Flying Platform – Flying wing – Folding wing – Form drag – Formation light - Flight information service – Fuel control unit – Fuel dumping

== G ==
Geared turbofan – General aviation – g-LOC – G-suit – Glass cockpit – Glide path – Glider aircraft – Glider (sailplane) – Glider pilot certificate – Glider snatch pick-up – Gliding – Gluhareff Pressure Jet – Go around – GPS – Gravel kit – Great-circle distance – Ground Air Emergency Code – Ground carriage – Ground effect – Ground support equipment – Gust lock – Gyrodyne – Gyro gunsight

== H ==
Hard deck – Hard landing – Hardstand – Heading indicator – Head-up display (HUD) – Hold (aviation) – History of aviation – Helicopter – Helicopter flight controls – Helocast – High-lift device – Horseshoe vortex – Hush kit – Hypermobility – Hypersonic flight

== I ==
ICAO spelling alphabet – Inertia coupling – Inertial Navigation System – Infrared (IR) – Infrared search and track (IRST) – Infrared signature – Instrument flight rules (IFR) – Instrument landing system (ILS) – Instrument rating – Indicated airspeed – Inlet cone – Intake/Inlet blank – Intake ramp – Interception procedure – International Air Transport Association (IATA) – International Civil Aviation Organization (ICAO) – Integrated drive generator (IDG) – Integrated engine pressure ratio (IEPR) – Intelligence, surveillance, target acquisition, and reconnaissance (ISTAR) – International Fighter Pilots Academy (IFPA) - Instrument meteorological conditions – Ion-propelled aircraft – Iron bird

== J ==
Jet airliner – Jet blast deflector (JBD) – Jet engine – Jetliner – Jettison – Jet wash – Jetway – Joint-use airport – Joystick

== K ==
Kneeboard – Krueger flap

== L ==
Landing – Landing gear – Landing gear extender – Landing lights – Landing mirror – Landing signal officer – Landing T – Landing zone – Laser induced cavitation – Laser supported detonation wave – Lateral control system (LCS) – Launch and recovery cycle – Leading-edge extension (LEVCON) – Lift (force) – Lift-induced drag – Light-sport aircraft – Longitudinal stability – Low-altitude parachute-extraction system – Lower Airspace Radar Service (LARS)

== M ==
Machmeter – Mach tuck – Magnetic chip detector – Maintenance – Master jet base – METAR – Meteorology – Maintenance, repair and overhaul – Minimum interval takeoff (MITO) – Mobility – Mobile Air Traffic Control Tower (Mobile ATC/MATC) – Mobile Electric Power Plant (MEPP) – Moving map display (MMD) – Multi-function display (MFD)

== N ==
NACA duct – Nacelle – Nanolight – Nautical airmile – Naval air station (NAS) – Naval outlying landing field – Naval aviation (NAV-AV) – Navalised aircraft – Navigation - Navigation light – Night aviation regulations in the US – No-fly zone – Non-directional beacon (NDB) – Non-towered airport – Nose bullet – NOTAM

== O ==
Obstacle departure procedure – Obstacle-free zone (OFZ) – Oleo strut – Operational Readiness Platform (ORP) – Oshkosh Airshow – Overhead join

== P ==
Parasitic drag – Parts departing aircraft – Performance and weather minima – Performance envelope – Personal air vehicle – P-factor – Phugoid – Pickle switch – Pilot controlled lighting – Pilot direction indicator (PDI) – Pilot decision making – Pilot licenses – Pilot licensing and certification – Pilot logbook – Pilot reports (PIREPS) – Pilot's Projected Display Indicator (PPDI) – Plane guard – Plasma cavitator leading edge – Podded engines – Powered lift – Power push-over – Precision approach path indicator – Precooled jet engine – Private pilot license – Prone pilot – Propeller – Propelling nozzle – Propfan – Propulsion-controlled aircraft (PCA) – Pulsejet – Pushback (aviation)

== Q ==
Quick access recorder – QFE – QNH – Q code – QTOL

== R ==
Radar – Radar intercept officer – Radio beacon – Radar blip – Radar cross-section – Radar gunsight – Radar lock-on – Radar picket – Radar warning receiver – Ram air turbine – Ramjet – Reaction engine – Reaction propulsion – Ready room – Rearward visibility panels – Reciprocating engines – Red square – Reduced-gravity aircraft – Reduced take-off and landing (RTOL) – Rejected takeoff – Relaxed stability – Remove before flight tag – RIAT – Roadable aircraft – Rocket turbine engine – Rogallo wing – Rotating detonation engine – Rough-field capability – Route structure – Rudder – Ruddervator – Rule of three (aviation) – Runway – Runway Awareness and Advisory System (RAAS) – Runway excursion – Runway incursion – Runway safety area (RSA) – Run-up (aviation)

== S ==
Satellite airfield – Scramjet – Seaplane base – Second line – Sectional chart – Self-sealing fuel tank – Shock diamond – Shcramjet – Short-field landing – Side-Looking Airborne Radar (SLAR) – Signal square – Simultaneous approach – Skid – Skin friction drag – Spatial disorientation – Spar – Spin (flight) – Spoiler (aeronautics) – Spy basket – Slats – Slip landing – Soft deck – specific fuel consumption (propeller engines) – Specific fuel consumption (jet engines) – Sport pilot certificate – Stabilator – Stagger – Stall – Standard day – Stealth aircraft – Stick shaker – STOLport – Sto-wing – Strike package – Student pilot certificate – Supercruise – Supermaneuverability – Supine cockpit – Swedish Civil Aviation Administration – Swing-wing – Synthetic cockpit – Synthetic vision system (SVS)

== T ==
T-tail – Tactical Camera System (TCS) – Tabletop runway – Tactical beacon (TACBE) – Tailess aircraft – Tail-dragger – Tailhook – Tail-sitter – Takeoff – Takeoff/go-around switch (TOGA) – Tankering – Target blip – Taxiing – Taxiway – Terrain-following radar (TFR) – Ten-code – Terminal area chart – Testbed aircraft – Three-surface aircraft – Thrust lever – Thrust reversal – Thrust vectoring – Track while scan – Traffic pattern indicator – Trailing cone – Transatlantic flight – List of transponder codes – Trim tab – True airspeed – Turbine engine – Turn and bank indicator – Twin-boom aircraft – Twin-fuselage aircraft – Twin tail

== U ==
Uncontrolled airport (see Non-towered airport) – Uncontrolled airspace – Underground hangar – Unequal rotor lift distribution – UPRT (Upset prevention and recovery training) – Urban Air Mobility – Usable fuel

== V ==
V speeds – V-tail – Valveless pulsejet – Variable cycle engine – Variable-pitch propeller – Venturi effect – Versatile Digital Analyzer (VERDAN) – Vertical situation display (VSD) – Vertical speed indicator – Vertical stabilizer (fin) – VFR-on-top – VFR over-the-top – Very light jet (VLJ) – Visual approach – Visual approach slope indicator (VASI) – Visual flight rules (VFR) – V_{NE} – VOR VHF omni-range (type of navigational beacon) – Visual meteorological conditions – Vortex generator

== W ==
Wake turbulence – Wake turbulence category – War emergency power – Water landing – Wave off – Waverider – Waypoint – Wayport – Wheel chock – Whiz Wheel – Wide-body aircraft – Wind shear – Wind tunnel – Wing – Wingman – Wingtip vortices – Wingbox – Wingless Electromagnetic Air Vehicle – Winglet – Wire strike protection system – World aeronautical chart

== Y ==
Yaw angle – Yaw string – Yehudi lights

== Z ==
Zero-fuel weight – Zero-length launch

== See also ==
- Lists of aviation topics
- List of aviation, avionics, aerospace and aeronautical abbreviations
- List of aviation mnemonics
- List of aircraft weapons
- Glossary of gliding and soaring
