= Golden Rule (disambiguation) =

The Golden Rule describes a "reciprocal" or "two-way" relationship between one's self and others that involves both sides equally and in a mutual fashion.

Golden Rule may also refer to:

== Economics ==
- Golden Rule (fiscal policy), a rule adopted in the UK by HM Treasury to provide guidelines for fiscal policy
- Golden Rule savings rate, the savings rate which maximizes consumption in the Solow growth model

== Science ==
- Fermi's golden rule, a formula of quantum mechanics
- Ronen's golden rule for cluster radioactivity, in nuclear physics

== Business ==
- Golden Rule Airlines, an airline in Kyrgyzstan that ceased operations in 2011
- Golden Rule Insurance Company, an American health insurance company that was acquired by UnitedHealth Group in 2003
- Golden Rule Store, the original name of J. C. Penney, an American department store chain

== Entertainment ==
- Golden Rule (album), the seventh studio album by Australian rock band Powderfinger
- Golden Rule (EP), an EP by Golden State
- "That Golden Rule," a song by Biffy Clyro
- "3-Way (The Golden Rule)," a song by The Lonely Island
- "Golden Rule," a space habitat in The Cat Who Walks Through Walls a science fiction novel by Robert A. Heinlein
- The Golden Rule, a 1961 magazine cover painting by Norman Rockwell

== Miscellaneous ==
- Golden rule (law), or the British Rule, a form of statutory construction traditionally applied by English courts
- Golden Rule (ship), a boat skippered by Albert Bigelow used in a nuclear-weapons protest
- Samuel M. Jones (1846–1904), a.k.a. "Golden Rule" Jones, mayor of Toledo, Ohio
- Rule of three (mathematics), also known as Golden Rule, a particular form of cross-multiplication in elementary mathematics
- Goldwater rule, an ethics related rule on commenting individuals' mental status without examining them personally or exposing them publicly without consent.

== See also ==
- Great Commandment, cited by Jesus
- Golden ratio (disambiguation)
- Rule of thirds (disambiguation)
