= All American Turbo-Cat =

The Turbo-Cat was a jet aircraft catapult launch system powered by six jet engines. It was invented by Don Doolittle, and manufactured by the All American Engineering Co. of Wilmington, Delaware, USA. Six Allison J33 engines in a capstan arrangement provided 50,000 horsepower directly to the launching cable. It was developed for expeditionary use by the U.S. Marine Corps, and it was to be air transportable.

Six jet engines are arranged in a circle with the exhausts facing the center where the mass flow of hot exhaust gasses is vented through a diffuser into a pair of large launching turbines. The launching turbines are connected by a main shaft to a cable drum from which an endless tensioned cable shunts underground to a launching track. Then down the track and around a pulley and back to the cable drum. By diverting the flow of exhaust gasses into a launching turbine, the cable drum and its tensioned cable can be accelerated to very high speeds.

== See also ==
- Index of aviation articles
- Rocket sled
- Rocket sled launch
- Dolly (trailer)
- Ground carriage
