= Law of Three =

Law of Three may refer to:

- For Gurdjieff's Law of Three see Fourth Way#Basis of teachings
- For the Wiccan concept see Rule of Three (Wiccan)

== See also ==
- Rule of Three (disambiguation)
