= OFZ =

OFZ may refer to:

- Obstacle-free zone, the protected airspace around an airport runway
- OFZ (bond), Russian government bonds
- Owen fracture zone, a transform fault in the northwest Indian Ocean
