= Canada Flight Supplement =

Canadian airport directory

The Canada Flight Supplement with its current blue cover since Nav Canada took over publication

The Canada Flight Supplement (CFS; French: Supplément de vol Canada) is a joint civil/military publication and is a supplement of the Aeronautical Information Publication (AIP Canada). It is the nation's official airport directory. It contains information on all registered Canadian and certain Atlantic aerodromes and certified airports.

The CFS is published, separately in English and French, as a paper book by Nav Canada and is issued once every 56 days on the ICAO AIRAC schedule.

The CFS was published by Natural Resources Canada on behalf of Transport Canada and the Department of National Defence until 15 March 2007 edition, at which time Nav Canada took over production.

== Contents ==
The CFS presents runway data, arrival and departure procedures, air traffic control (ATC) and other radio frequencies and services such as fuel, hangarage that are available at each listed aerodrome. As well, the CFS contains useful reference pages, including interception instructions for civil aircraft, chart updating data and search and rescue information. Most pilots flying in Canada carry a copy of the CFS in case a weather or mechanical diversion to another airport becomes necessary.

=== Sections ===
The Canada Flight Supplement is made up of seven sections:

- Special Notices – list of new or amended procedures.
- General Section – glossary, legends, airport code listing, list of abandoned aerodromes, and other introductory information.
- Aerodrome/Facility Directory – list all aerodromes alphabetically by the community in which they are located. A sketch of the airport is included showing runway layout, taxiways, locations of buildings and tower (if present). Also included in the sketch is an obstacle clearance circle (OCC).
- Planning – general flight planning information, including flight plans and position reports, airspace, lists of significant new towers and other obstructions, chart updating, preferred IFR routes, and similar information.
- Radio Navigation and Communications – listing of radio navigation aids and communication outlets, together with all known commercial AM broadcasters and their locations and frequencies.
- Military Flight Data and Procedures – military flight and reporting procedures for Canada and the U.S.
- Emergency – emergency procedures and guidelines for hijacks, fuel dumping, search and rescue, etc.

== Legal requirements ==
Carrying "current aeronautical charts and publications covering the route of the proposed flight and any probable diversionary route" is a requirement under CAR 602.60 (1) (b) for night VFR, VFR over-the-top and instrument flight rules (IFR) flights. This Canadian Aviation Regulation (CAR) does not specifically require carriage of a copy of the CFS, but that is one way to satisfy the regulation.

== NOTAMs ==
Because information in the CFS may be out of date, particularly with regard to such issues as runway closures and fuel availability, pilots should check NOTAMs before each flight. NOTAM information in Canada can be obtained from the Nav Canada Collaborative Flight Planning Services (CFPS) or by contacting the appropriate regional Nav Canada Flight Information Centre.

== Other similar publications ==
While Nav Canada's CFS has the monopoly on paper-version airport directories in Canada, there are several competing internet publications, including the Canadian Owners and Pilots Association's Places to Fly user-editable airport directory.

Nav Canada also publishes the Water Aerodrome Supplement (WAS) (French: Canada Supplément hydroaérodromes), as a single volume in English and French. This contains information on all Canadian water aerodromes as shown on visual flight rules (VFR) charts and other information such as navaids. The WAS is published on an annual basis.

== See also ==
- Airport/Facility Directory – U.S. publications roughly equivalent to the Aerodrome/Facility and Planning chapters of the CFS, but divided into several volumes covering different regions.
