= Rule of three =

Rule of three or Rule of Thirds may refer to:

== Science and technology ==
- Rule of three (aeronautics), a rule of descent in aviation
- Rule of five (C++), a rule of thumb about class method definitions, prior to C++11 known as the "rule of three"
- Rule of three (computer programming), a rule of thumb about code refactoring
- Rule of three (hematology), a rule of thumb to check if blood count results are correct
- Rule of three (mathematics), a method in arithmetic
- Rule of three (medicinal chemistry), a rule of thumb for lead-like compounds
- Rule of three (statistics), for calculating a confidence limit when no events have been observed

== Arts and entertainment ==
- Rule of three (writing), a principle of writing, storytelling, and rhetoric
- Rule of Three, a podcast by Jason Hazeley and Joel Morris
- Rule of Three, a series of one-act plays by Agatha Christie
- The Bellman's Rule of Three in The Hunting of the Snark, a poem by Lewis Carroll
- The Rule of Thirds, a 2008 album by Death In June
- Rule of 3, alternate title of Canadian 2019 TV movie All my husband's wives
- Rule of Three (film), an upcoming Temple Hill Entertainment horror film based on Sam Ripley's novel of the same name

== Other uses ==
- Rule of threes (survival), a mnemonic for the priorities of survival
- Rule of Three (Wicca), a religious tenet
- Celebrity death rule of threes, a superstition regarding the deaths of celebrities

== Variations ==
- Rule of thirds, a rule of thumb for composing visual images
- Rule of thirds (diving), a rule of thumb for divers
- Rule of thirds (military), a rule of thumb in military planning

== See also ==
- Three-sigma rule, for a normal distribution in statistics
- Triumvirate, a political regime dominated by three powerful individuals
