= Flight engineer =

Air crew member responsible for systems monitoring

External videos
- B-29 Flight Engineer

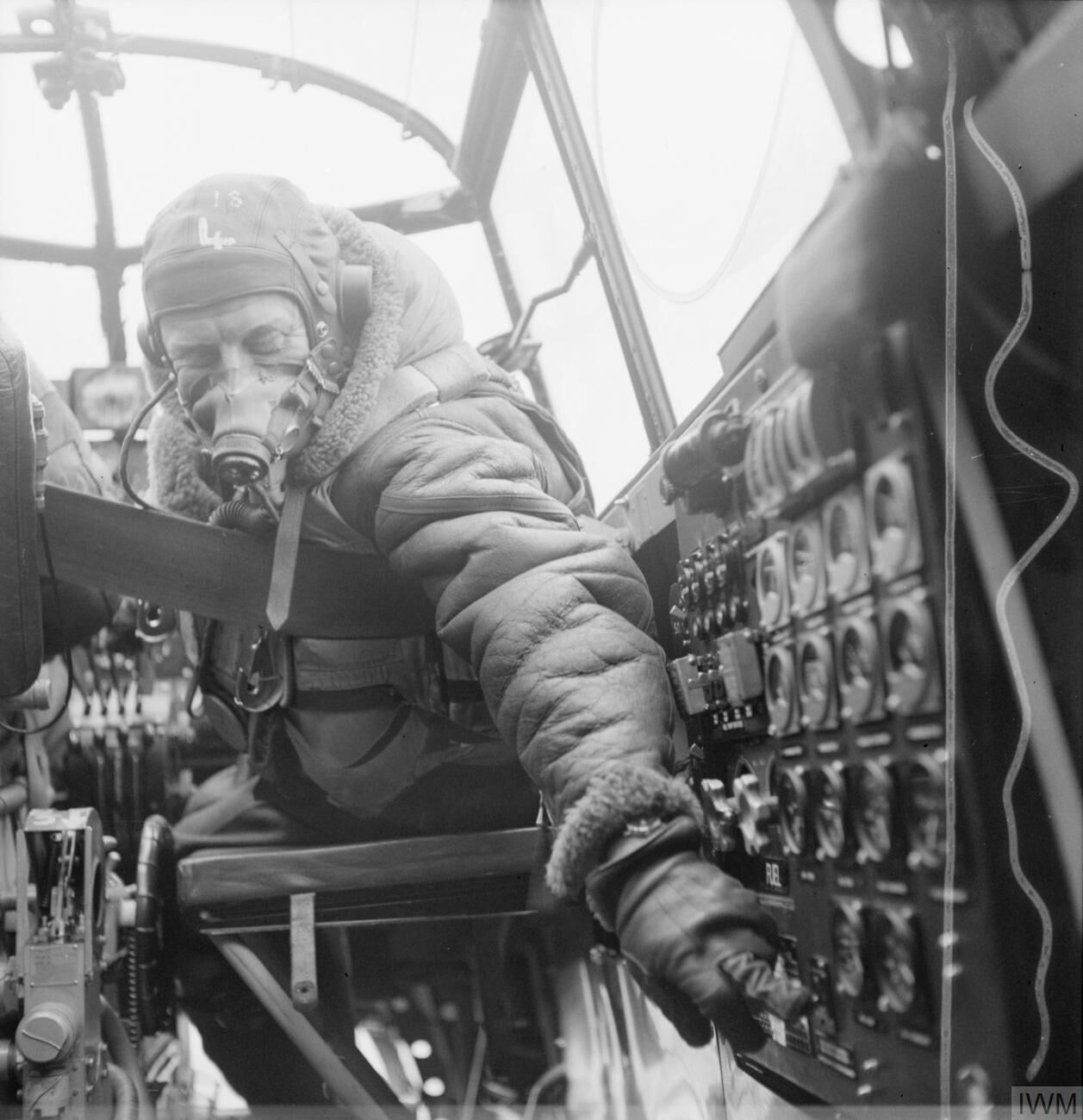
A flight engineer on an Avro Lancaster checks settings on the control panel from the fold down seat he used for take off in the cockpit - Imperial War Museum Image CH 12289

A flight engineer (FE), also sometimes called an air engineer, is a member of an aircraft's flight crew who is responsible for monitoring and operating its complex aircraft systems. In the early era of aviation, the position was sometimes referred to as the "air mechanic". Flight engineers can still be found on some larger fixed-wing airplanes and helicopters. A similar crew position exists on some spacecraft. In most modern aircraft, complex systems are monitored and adjusted by electronic microprocessors and computers, resulting in the elimination of the flight engineer's position.

In earlier days, most larger aircraft were designed and built with a flight engineer's position. For U.S. civilian aircraft that require a flight engineer as part of the crew, the flight engineer must possess an FAA Flight Engineer Certificate with reciprocating, turboprop, or turbojet ratings appropriate to the aircraft. Whereas the four-engine Douglas DC-4 did not require a flight engineer, the FAA type certificates of subsequent four-engine reciprocating engine airplanes (Boeing 307 and 377, DC-6, DC-7, Constellation) and early two-, three- and four-engine jets (Boeing 707, 727, early 747s, DC-8, DC-10, L-1011, early A300s) required them. Smaller twinjets (DC-9, 737, BAC 1-11, Caravelle) were never complex enough to require a flight engineer, while later large two, three, and four-engine jets (Airbus A310, A300-600, Boeing 767, MD-11, 747-400, and later) were designed with sufficient automation as to eliminate the need for the position.

== History ==
In order to dedicate a person to monitor an aircraft's engines and its other critical flight systems, the position of "flight engineer" (FE) was created. The FE did not actually fly the airplane; instead, the FE's position had a specialized control panel allowing for the monitoring and control of various aircraft systems. The FE is therefore an integrated member of the flight deck crew who works in close coordination with the two pilots during all phases of flight.

Traditionally, the FE station has been usually placed on the main flight deck just aft of the pilot and copilot, and close to the navigator. Earlier referred to as a "flight mechanic" on the four-engine commercial seaplanes like the Sikorsky S-42, Martin M-130 and the Boeing 314 Clipper, the FE's role was referred to as an "engineer" (much like a ship's engineer) on the first very large flying boat, the Dornier Do X. On the Do X the FE operated a large and complex engineering station similar to later large transport aircraft to monitor the twelve engines.

The first US military aircraft to include a FE was the Consolidated PBY which was introduced into naval service in 1936. The FE panel was located in the pylon between the fuselage and the wing. The FE did not have ignition, throttle and propeller controls, thus a person in the cockpit was also required to start the engines.

During the war the Avro Lancaster and Handley Page Halifax bombers employed FEs, as these large aircraft employed only a single pilot. The first Allied military operation during the Second World War involving FEs occurred in February 1941 with a Short Stirling; it was the first four-engined bomber-raid of the war by the RAF.

== Duties ==
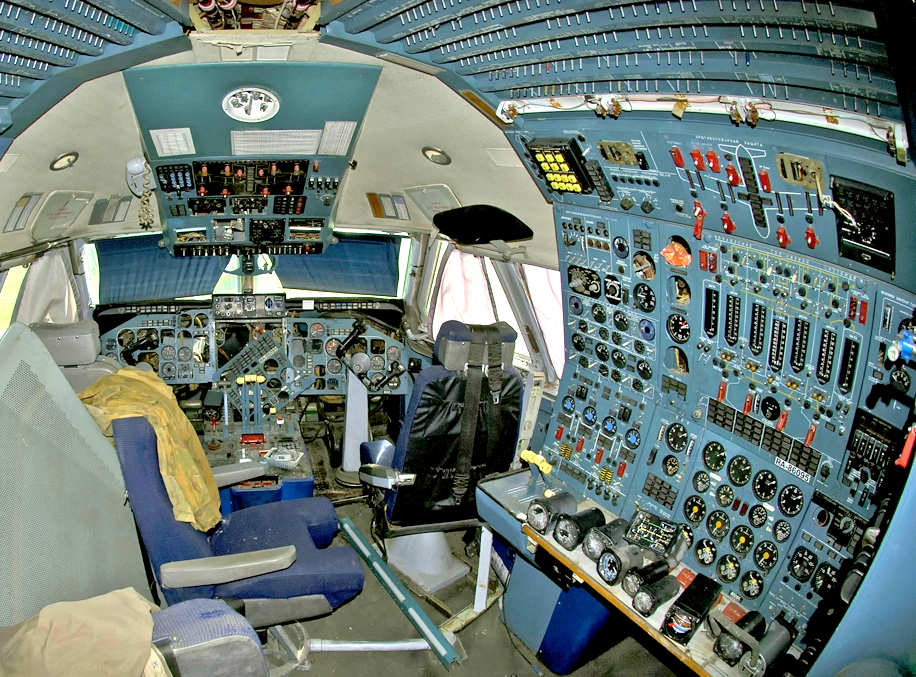
The cockpit of a non-operational four-engine Ilyushin Il-86, with its flight engineer's station at right

The flight engineer ("air engineer" in the Royal Air Force) is primarily concerned with the operation and monitoring of all aircraft systems, and is required to diagnose, and where possible rectify or eliminate, any faults that may arise. On most multi-engine airplanes, the FE sets and adjusts engine power during takeoff, climb, cruise, go-arounds, or at any time the pilot flying requests a specific power setting to be set during the approach phase. The FE sets and monitors major systems, including fuel, pressurization and air conditioning, hydraulic, electrics (engine driven generators, auxiliary power units), gas turbine compressor/air turbine motor (APU, GTC, ATM), ice and rain protection (engine and nacelle anti-ice, window heat, probe heater), oxygen, fire and overheat protection of all systems, liquid cooling system, draw through cooling system, forced air cooling system, and powered flying controls.

FEs are also responsible for preflight and postflight aircraft inspections, and ensuring that the weight and balance of the aircraft is correctly calculated to ensure the centre of gravity is within limits. On airplanes where the FE's station is located on the same flight deck just aft of the two pilots (all western three- and four-man deck airplanes), they also monitor an aircraft's flight path, speed, and altitude. A significant portion of their time is spent cross checking pilot selections. The FE is the systems expert of the airplane with an extensive mechanical and technical knowledge of aircraft systems and aircraft performance. On some military airplanes (Lockheed C-5 Galaxy, Boeing E-3 Sentry, McDonnell Douglas KC-10) the FE sits behind the co-pilot in the cockpit, facing outboard to operate a panel of switches, gauges and indicators or forward to operate throttles, lighting controls, flight controls. On the Tupolev Tu-134 the FE sits in the nose of the aircraft. On other western military airplanes, such as on the Lockheed P-3 Orion and Lockheed C-130H Hercules, FEs sit between, slightly aft of (and, in the case of the C-130A-H models, slightly higher than) the pilots. On the P-3 Orion, E-6B Mercury and E-3 Sentry the FE is responsible for starting and shutting down engines at the start and end of each flight, and also during in-flight shutdowns which are carried out to save fuel on long range operations. In some militaries, the aircraft's FE is also authorised to make and certify repairs to the aircraft when it is away from its base. This can eliminate the need for technical repair crews to accompany the aircraft on short deployments.

On civilian airplanes the FE is positioned so that they can monitor the forward instruments, pilot selections and adjust the thrust levers located on the centre pedestal; the FE's chair can travel forward and aft and it can swivel laterally 90 degrees, which enables them to face forward and set the engine power, then move aft and rotate sideways to monitor and set the systems panel. The FE is the aircraft systems expert onboard and responsible for troubleshooting and suggesting solutions to in-flight emergencies and abnormal technical conditions, as well as computing takeoff and landing data. The FE's seat on modern aircraft has a complete range of motion (side to side, forward to aft, swivel, up and down) to accommodate the many positions required to monitor and operate the aircraft systems.

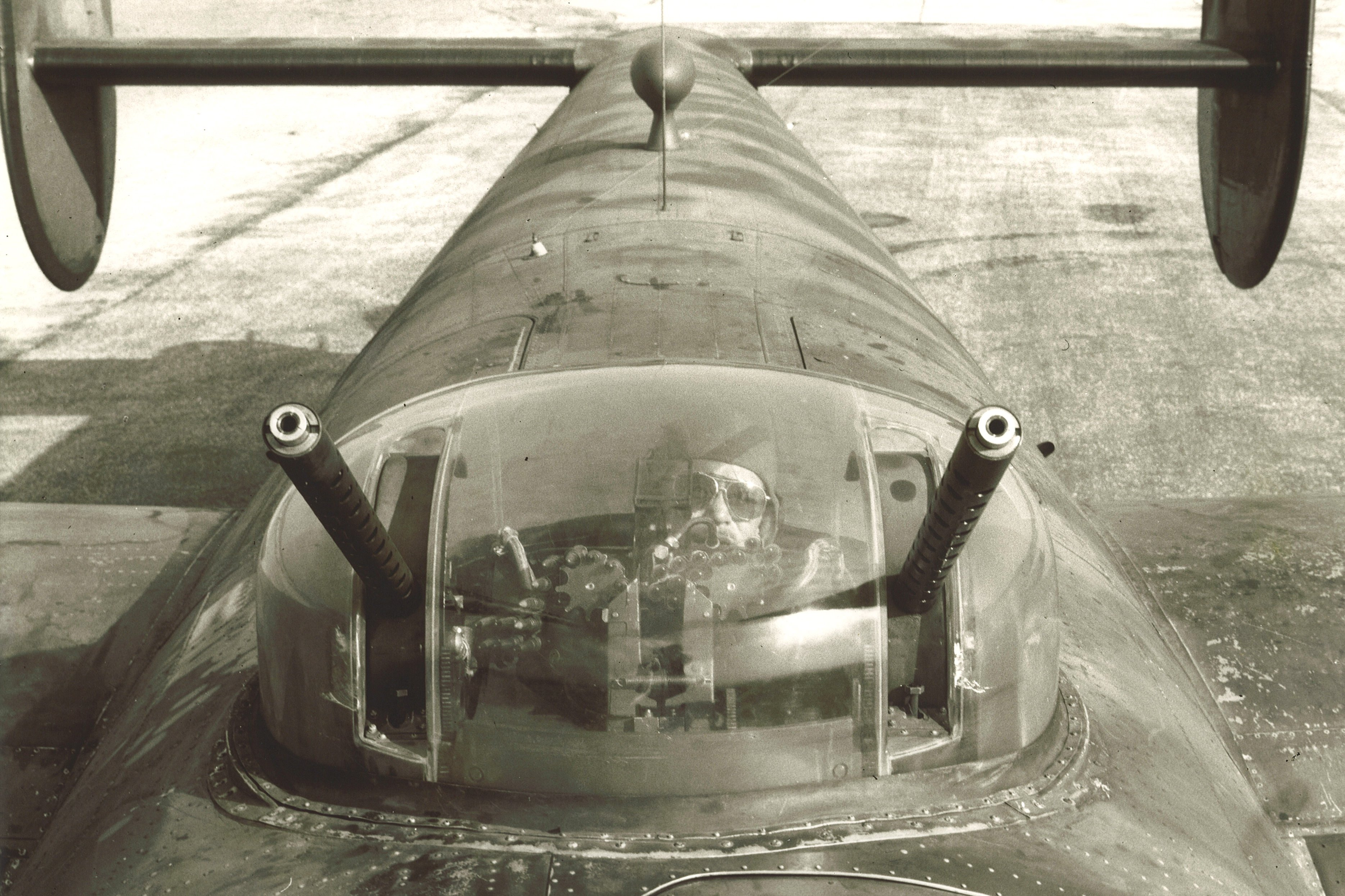
Flight engineers on military aircraft are sometimes responsible for operating weapons systems like the top turret on this Consolidated B-24 Liberator.

The basic philosophy of a three-person flight deck in many flight operations, should an abnormality or emergency arise, is for the captain to hand over the actual flying of the aircraft to the first officer (co-pilot). The captain and FE together review and carry out the necessary actions required to contain and rectify the problem. This spreads the workload and ensures a system of cross-checking which maximizes safety. The captain is the manager and decision maker (pilot not flying, PNF), the first officer, or co-pilot, is the actual flier of the aircraft (pilot flying, PF), and the FE reads the check-lists and executes actions required under the auspices of the captain. There can be occasions when the roles of the pilots during an emergency are reversed, i.e. the copilot becomes the PNF and the captain becomes the PF; one such example was on the A300 B-Series aircraft when there was a complete loss of generator-supplied electrical power, whereupon the standby instruments that were powered were on the captain's side only, requiring the captain to be PF and the PNF and FE to resolve the issue.

During World War II many U.S. bomber aircraft incorporated a flight engineer's position. However, this position also doubled as a gunner, usually operating the upper turret, as was the case of the Boeing B-17 Flying Fortress. On some commercial airliners with a flight engineer, the FE is the third in command, after the captain and first officer.

== Regulation ==
Unlike commercial pilots, the Federal Aviation Administration never set a mandatory retirement age for flight engineers. As a result, some pilots would voluntarily downgrade themselves when turning 60. This policy was the subject of two U.S. Supreme Court cases in 1985, when it ruled against Western Airlines that forced retirement of flight engineers based on the regulations for pilots was a violation of the Age Discrimination in Employment Act. Earlier in the year it had rejected a policy that prevented pilots from "bumping" flight engineers from their positions upon the former reaching retirement age.

== Elimination ==
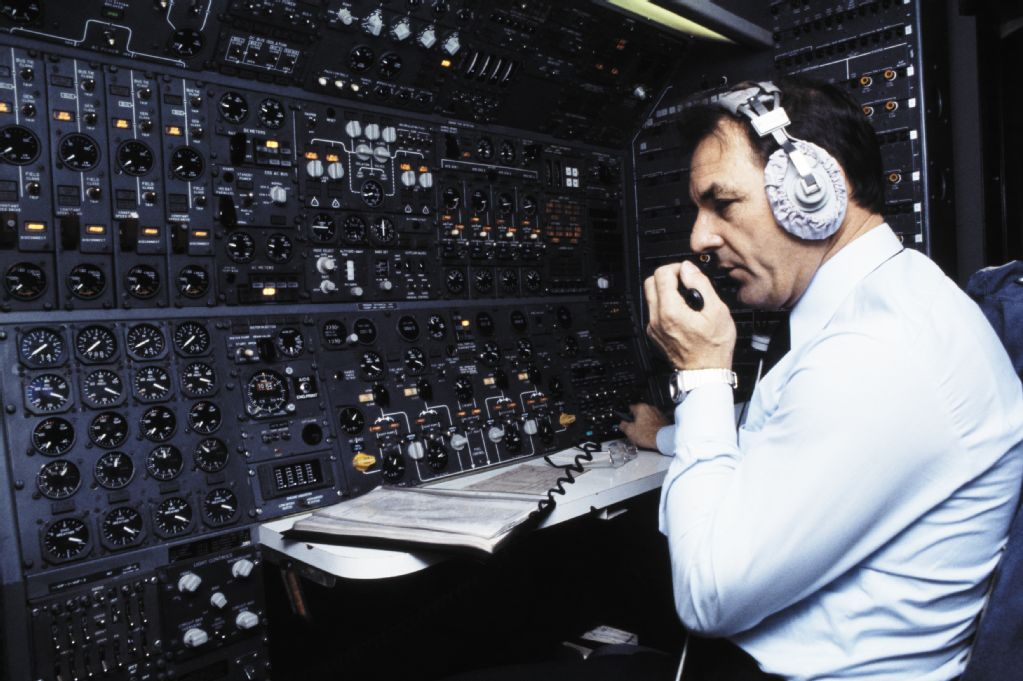
Flight engineer's station in a Boeing 747-200 of Swissair. Early 747 models were among the last commercial airliners to utilize a flight engineer.

Starting in the 1980s, the development of powerful and small integrated circuits and other advances in computers and digital technology eliminated the need for flight engineers on airliners and many modern military aircraft.

On two-pilot flight deck airplanes, sensors and computers monitor and adjust systems automatically. There is no onboard technical expert and third pair of eyes. If a malfunction, abnormality or emergency occurs, it is displayed on an electronic display panel. One pilot does the flying while the other pilot starts reading and executing the quick reference handbook (QRH) to resolve the problem. Modern technological advancements in today's aircraft have reduced the dependence upon human control over systems.

The most recent aircraft built with FE stations include military variants of the Boeing 707, such as the E-3 Sentry and E-6 Mercury, both built through 1991, the Tupolev Tu-154, the final example of which was delivered in 2013, and the Scaled Composites Stratolaunch whose sole example first flew in 2019. The last major US passenger airline to fly aircraft equipped with a flight engineer's station was Northwest Airlines, who retired their final 747-200s from charter service in 2009. The final major cargo operator to employ flight engineers was FedEx Express when they retired the last of their 727s in 2013. FedEx continued to operate the DC-10 until the end of 2022, all of which were originally delivered with a flight engineer's station, however all examples that were still in the fleet had been converted to MD-10 standard, which provided for a two-crew cockpit. FedEx officially retired its final MD-10 aircraft and closed out scheduled operations of the type at the end of 2022, parking the last of its remaining MD-10-30(F)s. They were replaced by highly efficient wide-body twins like the Boeing 767-300F.

== See also ==
- Flight management system
