= AMDB =

AMDB may refer to:

- Askar Melayu Diraja Brunei (Malay for Royal Brunei Malay Regiment), the forerunner of the Royal Brunei Armed Forces
- Aerodrome mapping database
- Arab Malaysian Development Banking Group, founded by Hussain Najadi
