= Airport/Facility Directory =

United States pilot's manual

The Airport/Facility Directory (abbreviated A/FD), now identified as Chart Supplement in the U.S., is a pilot's manual that provides comprehensive information on airports, large and small, and other aviation facilities and procedures.

== Description ==
The directory is published in seven volumes that cover the continental United States, Puerto Rico, and the U.S. Virgin Islands. Each volume is updated every 56 days by the United States Department of Transportation (DOT) with information from the Federal Aviation Administration (FAA) and the National Aviation Charting Office (NACO). Information is provided on public-use and joint-use airports, heliports, and seaplane bases. The directory includes data that cannot be readily depicted in graphic form, including airport hours. In addition, each A/FD contains information such as parachute jumping areas and facility telephone numbers.

The Airport/Facility Directory also provides a means for the FAA to communicate, in text form, updates to visual navigation charts between their revision dates — VFR Sectional and Terminal Area Charts are generally revised every six months.

Volumes are side-bound at 5 3/8 by 8 1/4 inches (140 mm × 210 mm), and colored a distinctive green.

As technology has improved, several vendors have started to offer some or all of the information from these guides in electronic form (see links below).

== Chart Supplement (A/FD) sections ==
The seven volumes the A/FD is published in are:

- Northeast U.S.
- Southeast U.S. (includes Puerto Rico and the Virgin Islands)
- East Central U.S.
- North Central U.S.
- South Central U.S.
- Northwest U.S.
- Southwest U.S.

The facility descriptions in each book are ordered by state, and then by city within the state. Separate A/FDs are contained in the Alaska Supplement and the Pacific Chart Supplement.

== Chart Supplement (A/FD) sample ==
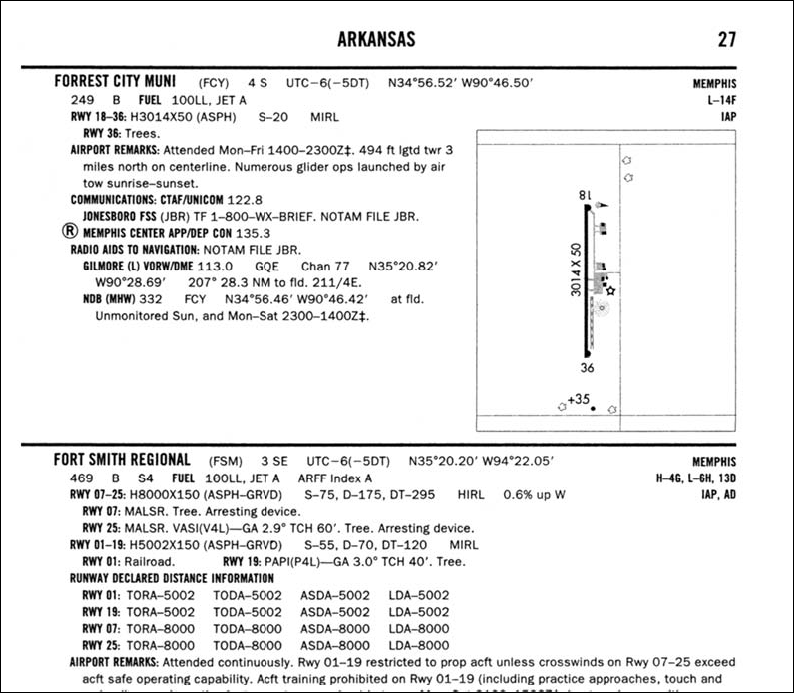
Sample A/FD entry

This sample page shows the entry for a small airport, Forrest City Municipal, in Arkansas (click on the image for a clearer view).

The airport's FAA location identifier is FCY. It is 4 nautical miles (7.4 km) south of the city, its time zone is UTC-6 (UTC−5 in summer), and the geographical coordinates of its Airport Reference Point (ARP) are 34°56.52′N 90°46.50′W. It can be found on the Memphis VFR Sectional chart, and the low-level en route chart 14F. It has at least one Instrument Approach Procedure, which is described elsewhere.

The airport's elevation (at the ARP) is 249 feet (76 m), it has a rotating beacon at night ("B"), and both 100-octane avgas ("100LL") and jet fuel are available although there is no mechanical servicing facility. There is one runway, 18–36 (that is, approximately magnetic north–south); it is hard-surfaced using asphalt, 3,014 feet (919 m) long and 50 feet (15 m) wide, and can bear aircraft with single-wheel landing gear up to 20,000 pounds. There is medium intensity runway lighting. Runway 36 (oriented north) has trees obstructing its approach. Free-text remarks follow.

There is no control tower; the common communications frequency is 122.8 MHz. The associated Flight Service Station is Jonesboro, with the telephone number and "Notices to Airmen" file code noted. Radar-assisted approach and departure control are provided by Memphis Center on 135.3 MHz.

Associated navigational installations are the Gilmore low-altitude VOR on 113.0 MHz (channel 77 for military operations), with an identifier of GQE, at the location indicated, and a non-directional beacon on 332 kHz, identified by FCY, on the airfield. This beacon is not monitored by the FAA for continuous operation during the hours shown.

Finally a sketch map provides a visual orientation of the airport's layout and nearby obstructions, primarily trees.

This article contains text taken from public-domain from the National Aeronautical Charting Office and FAA-H-8083-25, the Pilot’s Handbook of Aeronautical Knowledge.

== See also ==
- Canada Flight Supplement – Canada's version of the same document.
