= Endless runway =

Aircraft runway which loops around to form a shape such as a circle

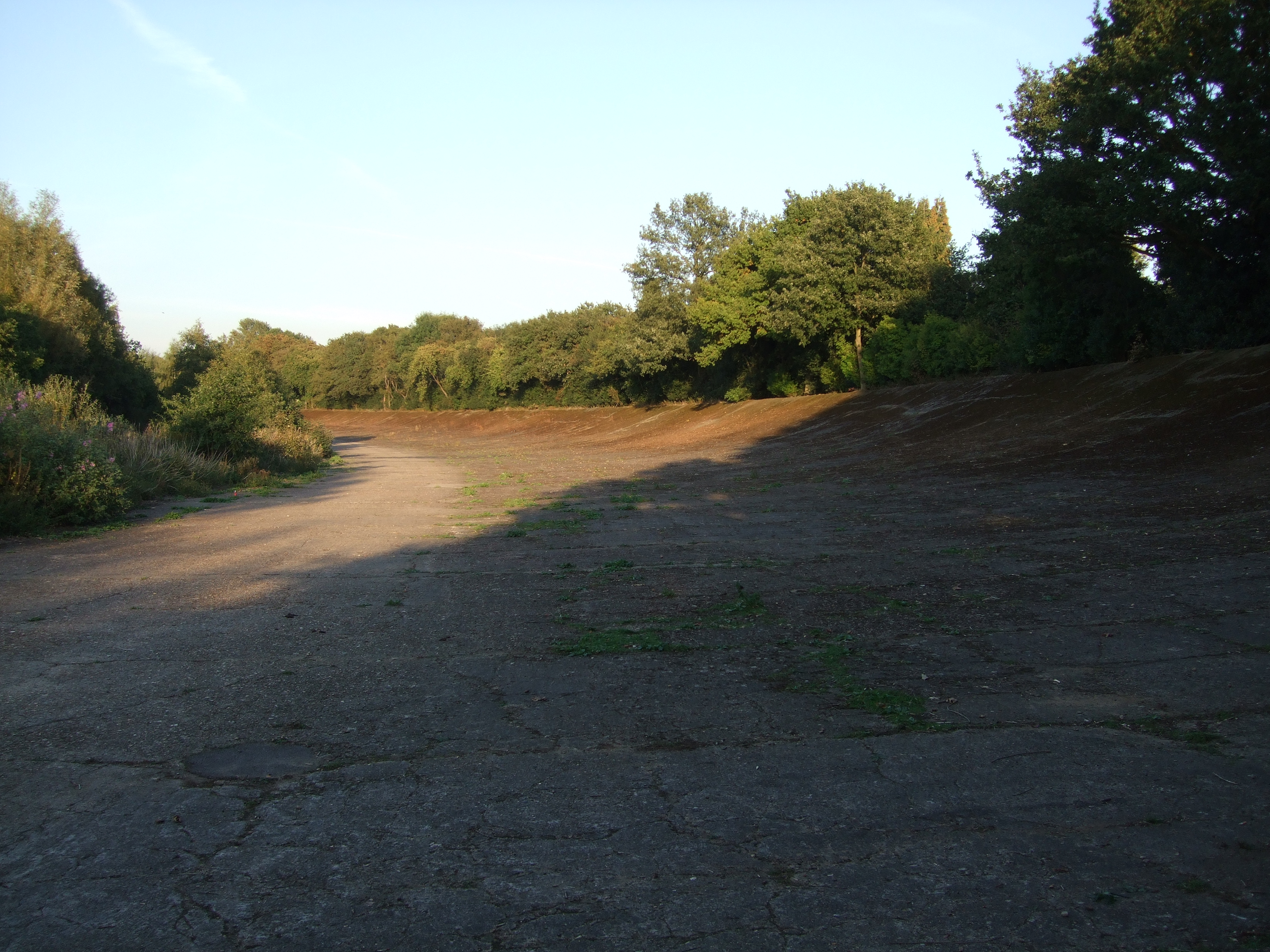
An endless runway would be banked to manage cornering forces. Brooklands was the first motor racing circuit to have banked corners and was also one of the first aerodromes.

An endless runway is an aircraft runway which loops around to form a shape such as a circle. While endless runways were conceptualized not long after the invention of the airplane, actual research has been limited throughout the 20th and 21st centuries.

== History ==
With the birth of the airplane, airplanes were once thought to supersede cars as common commuter vehicles. A 1919 Popular Science article featured an illustration of a banked circular runway constructed on top of a few multi-storey buildings in New York, where one of the buildings would serve as a hangar. A design was also made for a circular runway on the roof of King's Cross railway station in London.

Further experiments were performed in the 1960s by the US Navy; pilots performed take-offs and landings with relative ease. This work stimulated a large number of patents with runways shaped as circles or ovals and often straight tracks attached to it for taking off and landing.

In the 2010s, the idea was studied by a European consortium led by Henk Hesselink, an engineer at the Royal Netherlands Aerospace Centre. Their plans for a pilot experiment include a smaller circular runway for delivery drones.

== Advantages and disadvantages ==
According to Hesselink, a circular runway (in a commercial aviation context) serves as an alternative to space issues presented by a conventional arrangement of multiple straight runways, with up to three aircraft near-simultaneously taking off and/or landing on the same runway, as well as capacity issues in light of increasing air traffic. Crosswinds can also be accounted for, since an aircraft would theoretically be able to take off and land at any heading (i.e. always parallel to the wind).

Meanwhile, such a radical approach faces several challenges:

- The concave bank of the runway both increases stall speed (and thus landing speed), and also presents a greater risk of colliding with the wings or engine nacelles of landing airliners.
- The curvature and variable heading of the runway would render current instrument landing systems ineffective.
- Go-arounds could result in aircraft passing dangerously close to each other.
- Any crosswinds would negate any near-simultaneous landings, as any approaching aircraft would need to land at the same point on the runway to avoid crosswinds.
- Safety margins would make the runway wider than a conventional runway, and the outer edge of the runway "should not be designed as a large wall that airplanes can fall down from".

== See also ==
- Index of aviation articles
- Rocket sled launch
- Ski-jump (aviation)
