= Trailing cone =

Aviation calibration tool

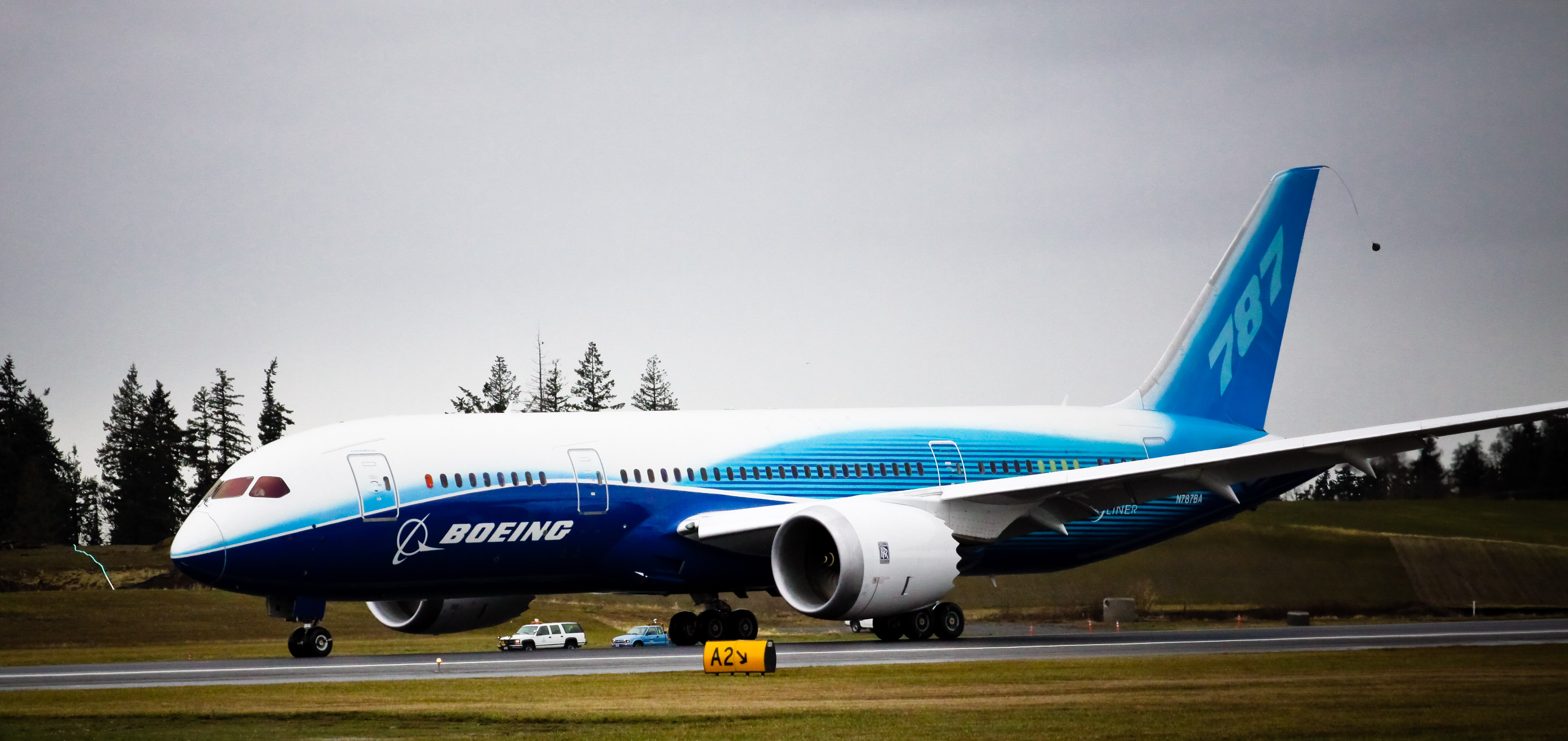
A Boeing 787-8 during a test flight with a trailing cone attached to the vertical stabilizer

A trailing cone (also a trailing static cone or, incorrectly, a trailing wire) is an aviation calibration tool first developed and tested in the 1950s and 1960s as a simple means of determining or calibrating the static pressure (altitude reporting) of an aircraft's pitot-static system. It does this by giving an accurate measurement of the ambient atmospheric pressure (static pressure) well clear of the aircraft's fuselage. The trailing cone system typically trails at least one fuselage length behind the aircraft via a high-strength cable containing a tube or attached to a tube to cone or similar stabilizing device at the end. Static pressure is measured forward of the cone by several static ports. The cone stabilizes and aligns the ports relative to the freestream airflow.

== Other precision static pressure measurement methods in test flight ==
As stated in FAA Advisory Circular AC 91-85A:

- Precision tracking radar in conjunction with pressure calibration of atmosphere at test altitude
- Chase aircraft
- Any other method acceptable to the approving authority

== See also ==
- Index of aviation articles
- Reduced vertical separation minima
- Static pressure
