= Ground carriage =

An aircraft ground carriage (also "ground power assisted takeoff and landing concept") is a landing gear system connected to the ground, on which aircraft can take off and land without their aircraft-installed landing gear. The technical feasibility of the ground carriage is being investigated by two research groups. In 2013, IATA included the technology into their "Technology Roadmap"; Airbus pursues the concept as part of its "Future by Airbus” strategy.

== Advantages and functionality ==
The aircraft-installed landing gear and related structures and systems account for 6 to 15 per cent of the empty weight of an aircraft, but it is only required on the ground for takeoff and landing as well as for taxiing and parking. During cruise flight, it is carried along as unused ballast. An aircraft without landing gear could therefore require 8 to 20 per cent less fuel in flight. Furthermore, landing gears are one of the most expensive aircraft systems and complex in operation and maintenance. Finally, less noise is emitted when the drag of the undercarriage is omitted during approach and the engines are switched off while taxiing on ground.

A ground carriage provides the means for an aircraft to takeoff and land without carrying an own aircraft-installed landing gear. Instead, the aircraft is equipped with much lighter interfaces, which connect to the ground carriage.

Every airport approached by aircraft without landing gear must operate at least one ground carriage. In addition, alternate airports must be available if an airport is closed due to bad weather or a system failure. For emergency landings outside of runways, unsuitable flooring or unpaved ground cannot absorb the high wheel loads. Therefore, the landing gear of heavy long-haul aircraft in emergency landing on unsuitable ground is often not extended, since it would otherwise sink into ground first and then bend or break off.

== Related Concepts ==
The precursor of the aircraft ground carriage is the jettisonable or detachable landing gear, wherein the aircraft takes-off from a cart, which is then released and eventually lands on skids (IE: SNCASE Baroudeur). It was used on all operational examples of the Messerschmitt Me 163B Komet with its jettisonable twin-wheel "dolly" main gear — its conventional arrangement included a semi-retractable tailwheel on the Komet's rear fuselage, the Hütter Hü 136 — and the first eight prototypes of the Arado Ar 234 "Blitz", which all used a jettisonable tricycle-gear arrangement "trolley" design. The glider Schleicher Ka 1, which was built in the 1950s, also had a droppable landing gear. A Sea Vampire Mk.21 landed with retracted landing gear on an aircraft carrier with flexible rubber decks for testing purposes. The Rockwell HiMAT unmanned aerial vehicle used skids for landing.

The idea of the aircraft ground carriage is finally related to the aircraft catapult, especially with the Electromagnetic Aircraft Launch System, which is currently under development.

== GroLaS ==
"GroLaS" (Ground-based Landing System) is an aircraft ground carriage system which is being developed since 2008 by a Hamburg-based company in cooperation with the Technical University of Hamburg-Harburg and the German Aerospace Center.

Currently, the setup of a small scale demonstrator is envisioned, the full scale system is planned to be ready for market entry in 2035. The focus of the GroLaS study starts with long-haul cargo aircraft. In a first implementation of the system, the world's major cargo airports and corresponding alternate airports have to be equipped. The costs for an airport are expected to be 500 million euros. GroLaS is patented in Europe, the USA and China. A model in 1:87 scale, which was built in 2013, was exhibited at the Berlin Air Show in 2014.

GroLaS consists of a slide which speeds up and slows down by means of a maglev system installed on both sides of the runway. Thus, the conventional runway remains and enables a dual usability of conventional aircraft and of aircraft without installed landing gear. Upon landing, the slide automatically accelerates the mounted ground carriage to the approaching speed of the aircraft before touchdown and adjusts its position longitudinally and laterally to the aircraft. Pins located on the ground carriage couple into corresponding aircraft installed interfaces. Takeoff and landing are less susceptible to side winds due to a yaw angle adjustment. The braking energy is converted into electrical energy, which can be used to support the aircraft engines during takeoff. The braking distance is shortened, and there is no reverse thrust required. For taxiing, the ground carriage can be decoupled from the slide to remain underneath the aircraft.

== GABRIEL ==
"GABRIEL" ("Integrated Ground and on-board system for support of the Aircraft Safe Takeoff and Landing") is a research project to develop an aircraft ground carriage started in 2011 by a consortium of several European universities, companies and institutions.

The proposed aircraft ground carriage moves on its own electromagnetic rail system and not on a conventional runway. The pins for attaching to the ground carriage are installed on the aircraft and the aircraft needs to synchronize laterally to the position of the ground carriage, which is a different approach compared to the GroLaS-concept. Parallels are the longitudinal and yaw angle synchronisation and, that the electrically driven ground carriage is designed demountable from the slide for taxiing.

== See also ==
- Index of aviation articles
- Rocket sled
- Rocket sled launch
- Dolly (trailer)
