= Flame damper =

Aircraft Device

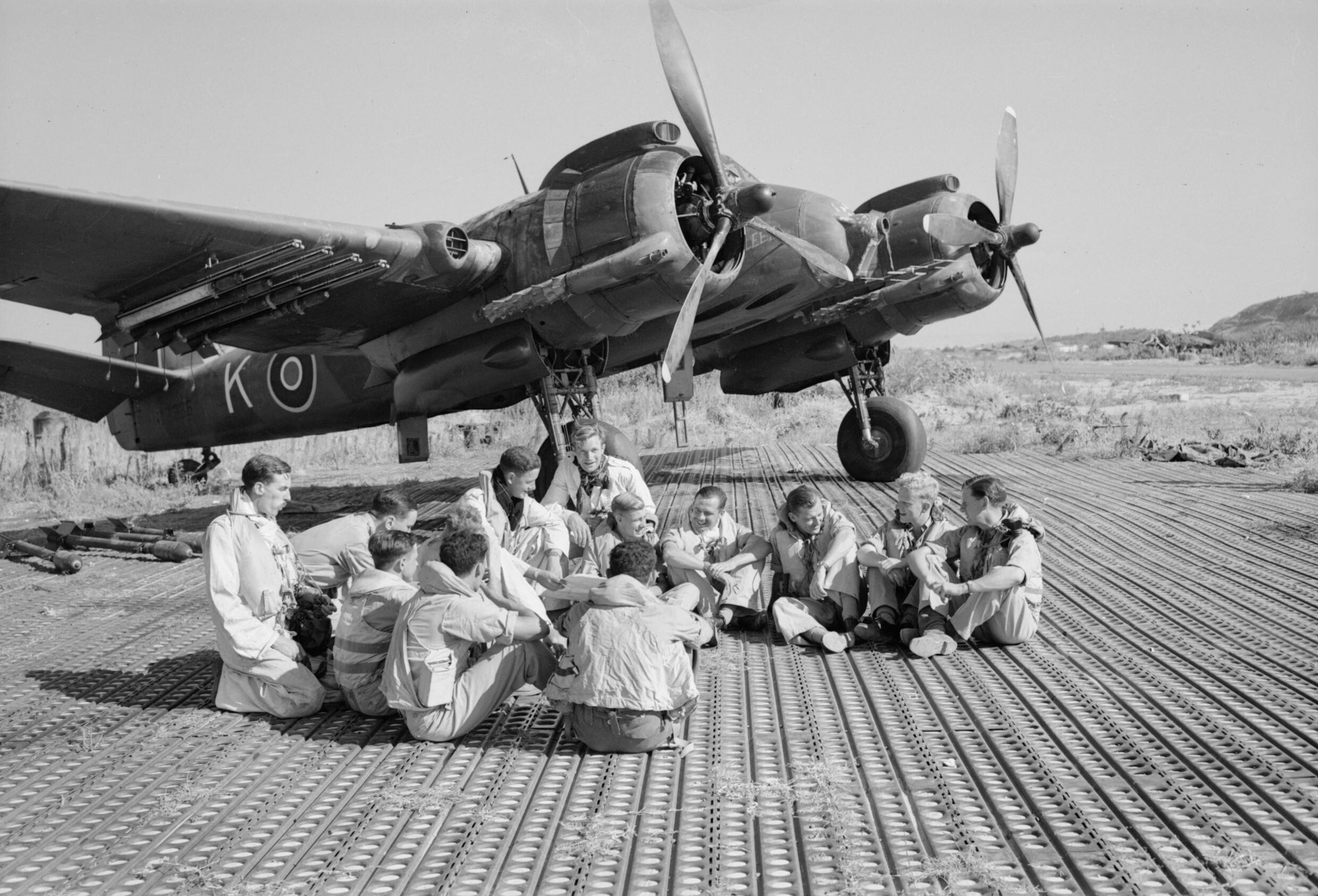
The flame dampers on the bottom of the engine on this Bristol Beaufighter were typical for 1940s RAF aircraft with radial engines.

A flame damper, also known as a flame suppressor, is a device attached to the exhaust manifold of an aircraft engine that mixes air with the still-incandescent exhaust to ensure it is completely cooled, and thus no longer visible, before it exits the damper. Dampers were standard equipment on night bombers and night fighters during World War II. Because they entrained air, they had a negative effect on performance and were often removed by ground fitters when the aircraft was being used during the day. A similar device used on firearms is known as a flash suppressor.

== See also ==
- Index of aviation articles
- Infrared countermeasure
