= Exint pod =

Military passenger pod

The exint pod was a design for a man-carrying, under-wing pod capable of being fitted to the underwing weapons pylons on military fast-jets and military helicopters. The concept was conceived by the former Acton, London based aircraft consultancy AVPRO U.K. Ltd as a method of inserting and extracting special forces operatives. According to Flight International magazine, in the late 1990s the UK Defence Evaluation and Research Agency test fitted a prototype pod to a BAe Sea Harrier at its Boscombe Down research facility. The pod was also certified for use on Israeli AH-64 Apaches. The Harrier has now been retired from RAF and Royal Navy Service. McDonnell Douglas also produced models of a GRIER (Ground Rescue Insertion Extraction Resupply) pod for the AV-8B.

Problems have been cited with using weapons pylon mounted pods to ferry personnel on fast jets in particular. Excessive engine noise (in the case of the Harrier, due to proximity to the rotating jet nozzles of the Rolls-Royce Pegasus engine), high g-forces during roll due to the distance of the pod from the aircraft's axis of roll, as well as the discomfort of travelling at fast-jet speeds have all been listed as limitations.

The concept of ferrying passengers in or on modified fixed and rotary wing combat aircraft has many historical precedents. During the Second World War, "body-bags" (fabric bags mounted on the upper inboard surfaces of Spitfire wings) were used to carry people. The Luftwaffe also experimented with people-carrying wing-mounted enclosures on the Stuka dive bomber and Bf 109 fighter. Modified versions of the P-38 Lightning were capable of carrying people in underwing, perspex fronted pods. Versions of the De Havilland Mosquito operated by BOAC were used to ferry passengers in modified capsules in the space that would have been the bomb bay; the most notable being Danish nuclear physicist Niels Bohr.

Among more contemporary aircraft, it has been suggested that the Sukhoi Su-25 Frogfoot is capable of carrying underwing pods to self-deploy, which can also carry a crew member if necessary.

What appear to be US Marines have been photographed strapped to weapons bay doors on Marine Bell AH-1 Cobra attack helicopters in Afghanistan. This extraction and insertion technique is understood to be one of several practised by Marine Cobra pilots.

External Passenger Pods (EPS), comprising open framework, have been fitted to US Army MD Helicopters MH-6 Little Bird helicopters, allowing up to six soldiers to be transported externally.

== See also ==
- Index of aviation articles
