= Short-field landing =

Procedure for aircraft landing on a short runway

Short-field landing is a demanding procedure for pilots in aircraft. It is performed when the length of the runway or landing area is relatively short or where obstacles in close vicinity to the landing approach limit the available landing area. In the latter case, the runway likely has a displaced threshold.

== Technique ==
The required procedure differs based on the aircraft type, so the Pilots Operating Handbook (POH) should be consulted for the specific aircraft type. In general, the technique is to utilize maximum flaps for this type of landing. The approach is made with engine power commensurate with maintaining the approach airspeed listed in the POH. In cases where a POH is unavailable, a speed not more than 1.3 V_{SO} should be used. The use of full flaps will enable steeper approaches to the aiming point, which is particularly useful in cases where the approach must be made over obstacles. Speed must be maintained precisely in order to execute a stabilized approach. After touch-down, the pilot applies maximum wheel braking and up-elevator to counter the pitch-over moment caused by braking and reduce the chances of a propeller strike. Flaps are sometimes retracted to allow better braking performance by reducing lift on the wing. Spoilers may also be used when equipped.

== See also ==
- Index of aviation articles
- STOL
