= Ready room =

Room on an aircraft carrier

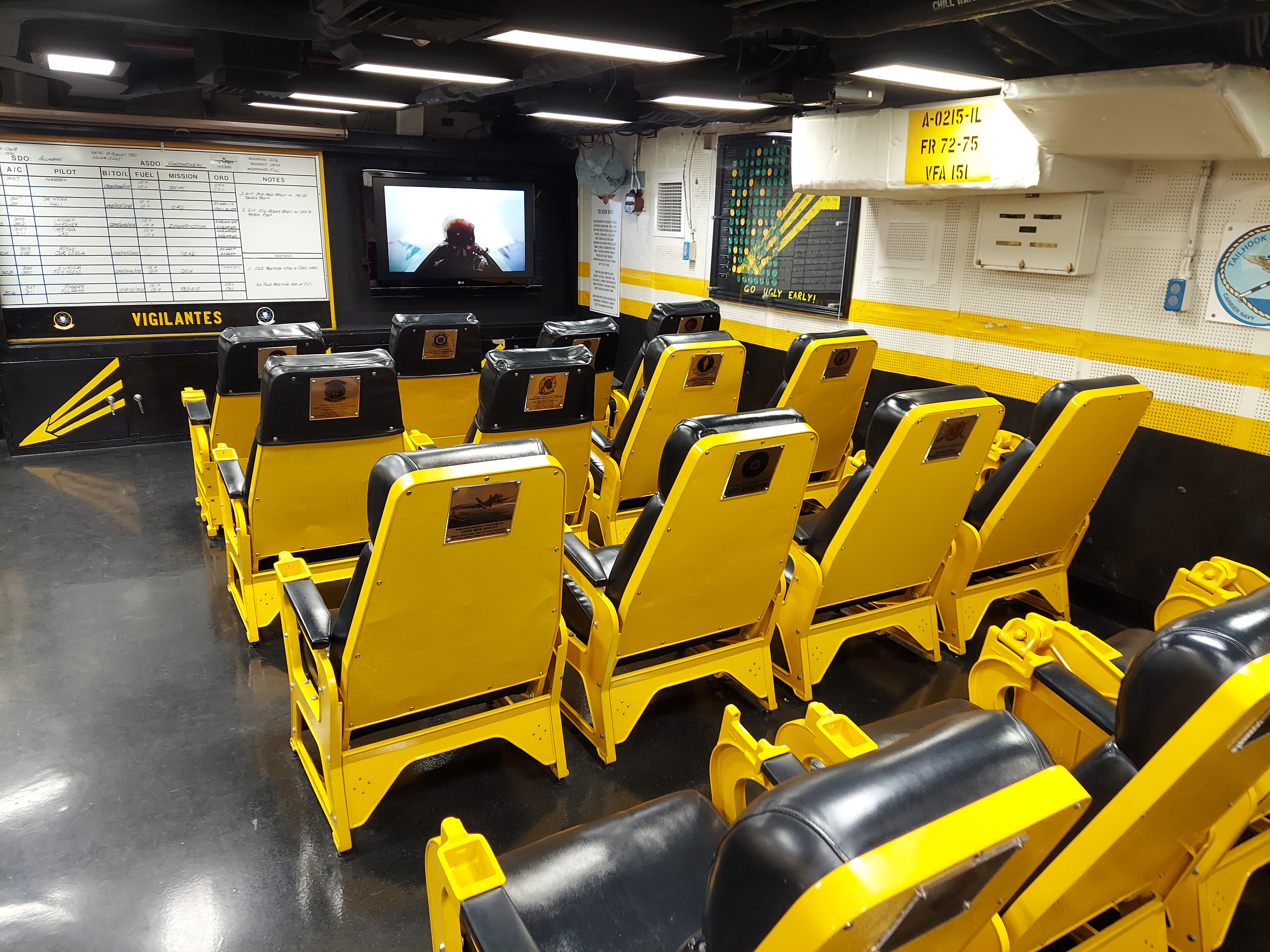
Ready room aboard the USS Midway

A ready room in US Navy usage is a compartment on an aircraft carrier where aircrew conduct much of their pre-flight and post-flight briefs. Each flight squadron has its own individual ready room, and it is common for the squadron's "Maintenance Control" office to be located next to or near the ready room. Maintenance Control is where pilots review possible existing problems with an aircraft, and it is where they officially sign for the aircraft. This is also where air crews can get "Maintenance Action Forms" post-flight to report any new problems.

The term has been used in relation to British aircraft carriers, and to US land-based military aircraft operations.

Squadron pilots in the Second World War considered the ready room to be a clubroom. A pilot who served during World War II stated that, in his personal view:

The funny thing about a ready room is that you get attached to the hole. As much as you are attached to the ship. It's more than sentiment. It's an urge for protection. The loneliest feeling in the whole of a carrier pilot's world is when he's at sea with the gas running low, and he can't see his carrier. You think of the ready room then, and the noisy guys who make it the most desirable place in the world. It's your office, you live in it, it is the big thing in your life. [...] You sweat and worry in it, and grouse and argue, and you get mad at it when you can't hear yourself speak because everyone is yelling at once, but you're deeply attached to the place.

— Tommy Booth, "Wildcats" Over Casablanca

== A typical ready room ==
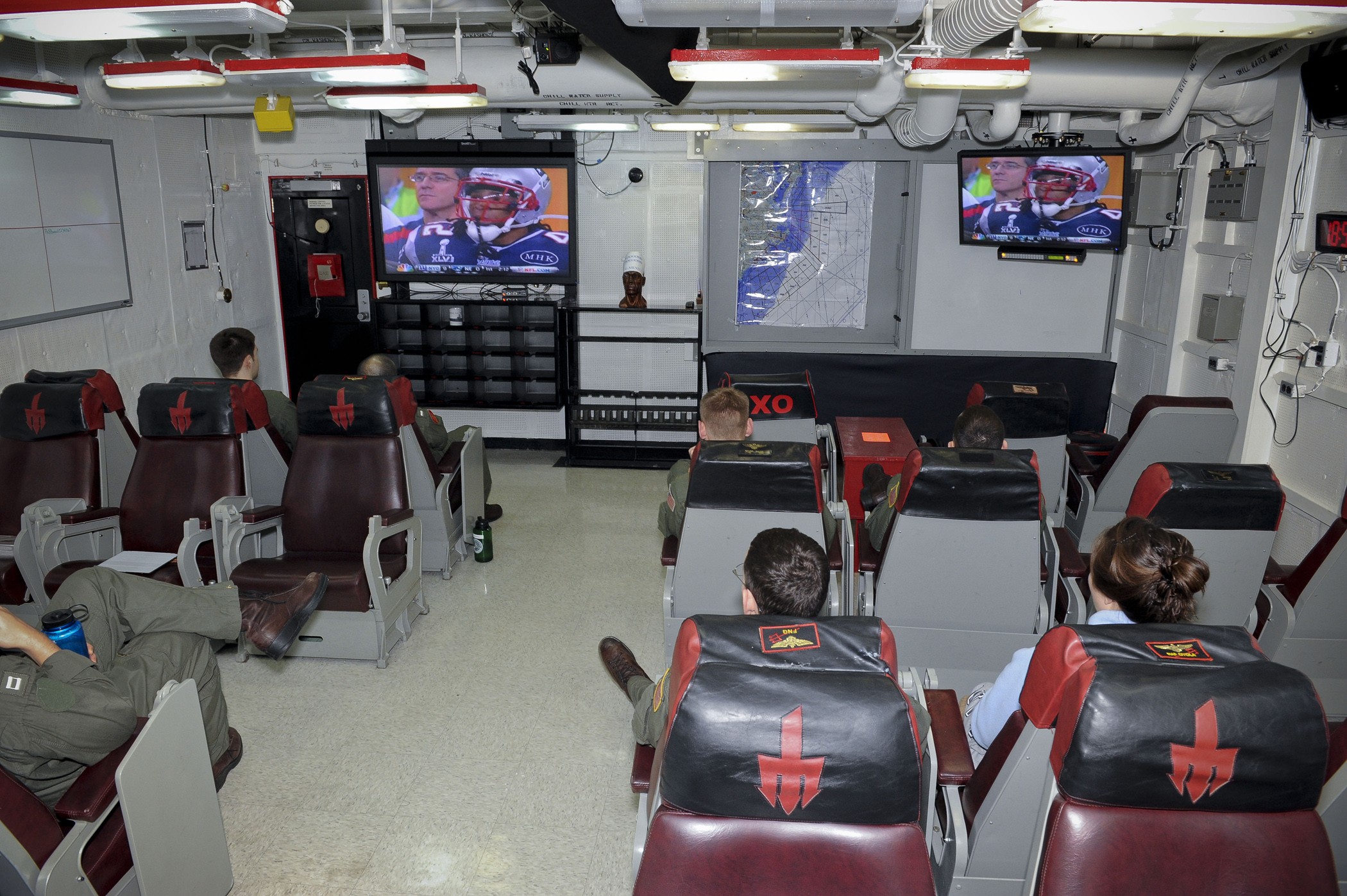

The typical ready room is equipped as follows:

- Armchair seats with fold-up table tops for the air crews. The commanding officer (CO) and executive officer (XO) sit in the front row on either side of the aisle, with the CO on the left, reflecting a pilot's seat in a cockpit, and with the XO on the right, reflecting a co-pilot's seat in a cockpit.
- A coffee urn and sometimes a popcorn machine for those nights when a movie is shown.
- A loudspeaker tied in to the ship's 1MC (1 Main Circuit) public address system
- A white board at the front of the room.
- An aircraft tracking board where the status of all aircraft preparing for flight and those in flight are tracked. These also include the names of the crew members and a code for the mission type.

The typical "on duty" ready room personnel include the Squadron Duty Officer (SDO) and the Assistant Squadron Duty Officer (ASDO) who serves as a phone talker who uses the aircraft tracking board. Ready rooms are typically also occupied by air crews who are catching up on paperwork and the space also often serves as a place for small informal meetings. Once flight operations are complete for the day it's common for a movie to be shown for anyone in the squadron that can attend.

== Operations ==
One humorous memorandum by a pilot on the USS Wasp (CV-18) had this to say of the Wasp's ticker tape:

When you first man your ready rooms, you will note a large screen known as a teletype. Learn to ignore this immediately. The information given on it is about as fresh as an 1873 edition of the New York Times. In between numerous erasures you will find given a point option undoubtedly used by Commodore Perry on his way to Japan in 1853. Certainly it won't apply to your present operations.

— R.D. White, A Memo to CAG-81 from CAG-14

Much of a pre-flight brief is conducted over a closed-circuit television system for all the air crews together (regardless of squadron) who are scheduled to take off, or "launch," at the start of any particular flight cycle (cycles generally are about 90 minutes; some aircraft usually fly a single cycle while others may fly for two or three cycles before returning). These briefs are broadcast from the ship's Air Operations Department and include general mission details (so that everyone is aware of what other crews will be doing), various procedures, radio frequencies and weather reports. Additional briefing may be conducted in other areas of the ship depending on the mission type. (Fighter/attack crews will generally brief in Strike Operations, for instance.)

The ship's Air Operations Department communicates with the ready room via the ASDO when reporting launch and landing times, and standard telephones are used for other communications.

== Placement ==
In the autumn of 1945, CinCPAC conducted a review of aircraft carrier design, intended to produce a successor design to that of the Essex-class aircraft carrier, based upon contrasting experiences of British and U.S. carriers encountering kamikaze attacks off Okinawa. The British design had successfully resisted such attacks, whilst the U.S. design had not.

The report touched upon the issue of the location of ready rooms:

It was demonstrated with large loss of life through Kamikaze hits that the gallery deck is not the location for pilots' ready rooms. As many as possible of the ready rooms should be located inboard beneath horizontal armor and protected access to the flight deck should be furnished. BuShips is now preparing final plans for relocation of ready rooms 2, 3, and 4 to the second deck on the CV 9 class carriers, utilizing the wardroom as number 2. Number 1 should remain in the gallery deck for scrambling purposes

— CinCPAC, 1945

On post-war Nimitz- and Ford-class aircraft carriers, the ready rooms are located on the 03 level directly under the flight deck. Also on this level are the "lofts" (a throwback to "parachute lofts") where air crew survival equipment is kept and maintained.

== See also ==
- Index of aviation articles
- Lists of aviation topics
- List of aviation, avionics, aerospace and aeronautical abbreviations
