= Glider snatch pick-up =

Airborne warfare technique

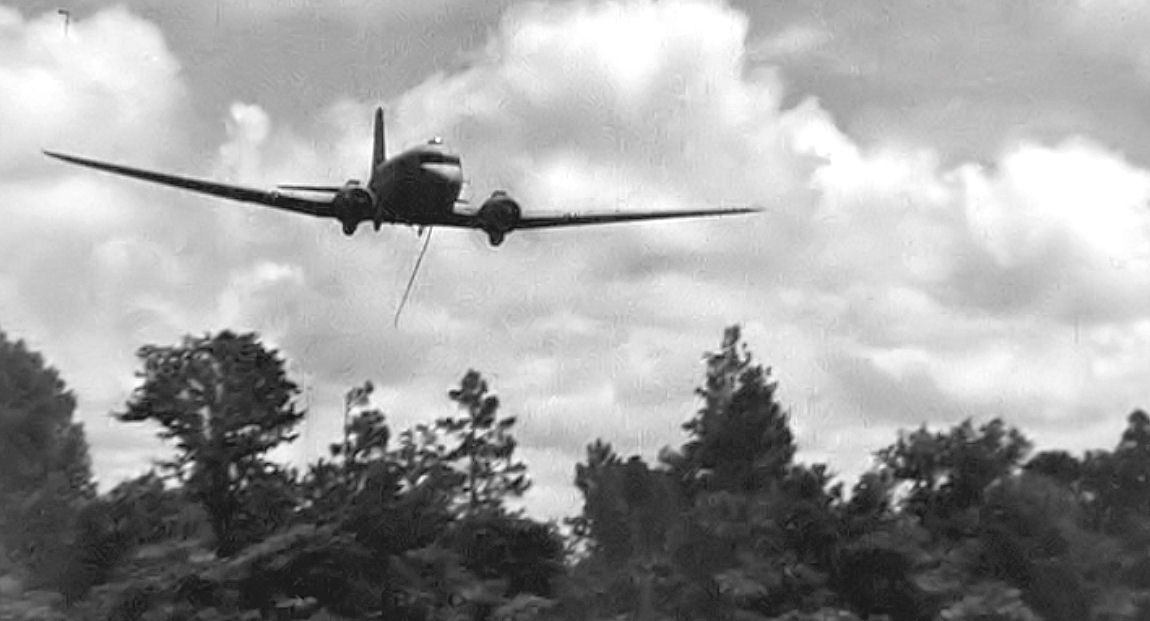
C-47 aligning for Snatch Pick Up of CG-4 Glider in 1942.

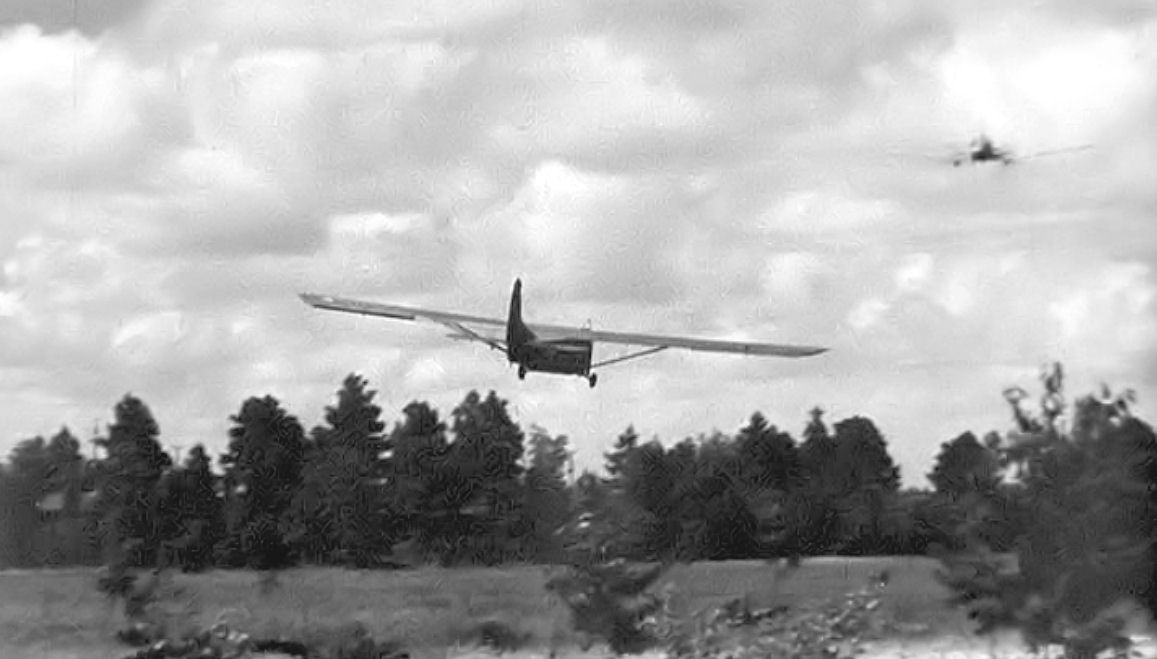
A CG-4 Glider taking off after a snatch pickup by a C-47 in 1942.

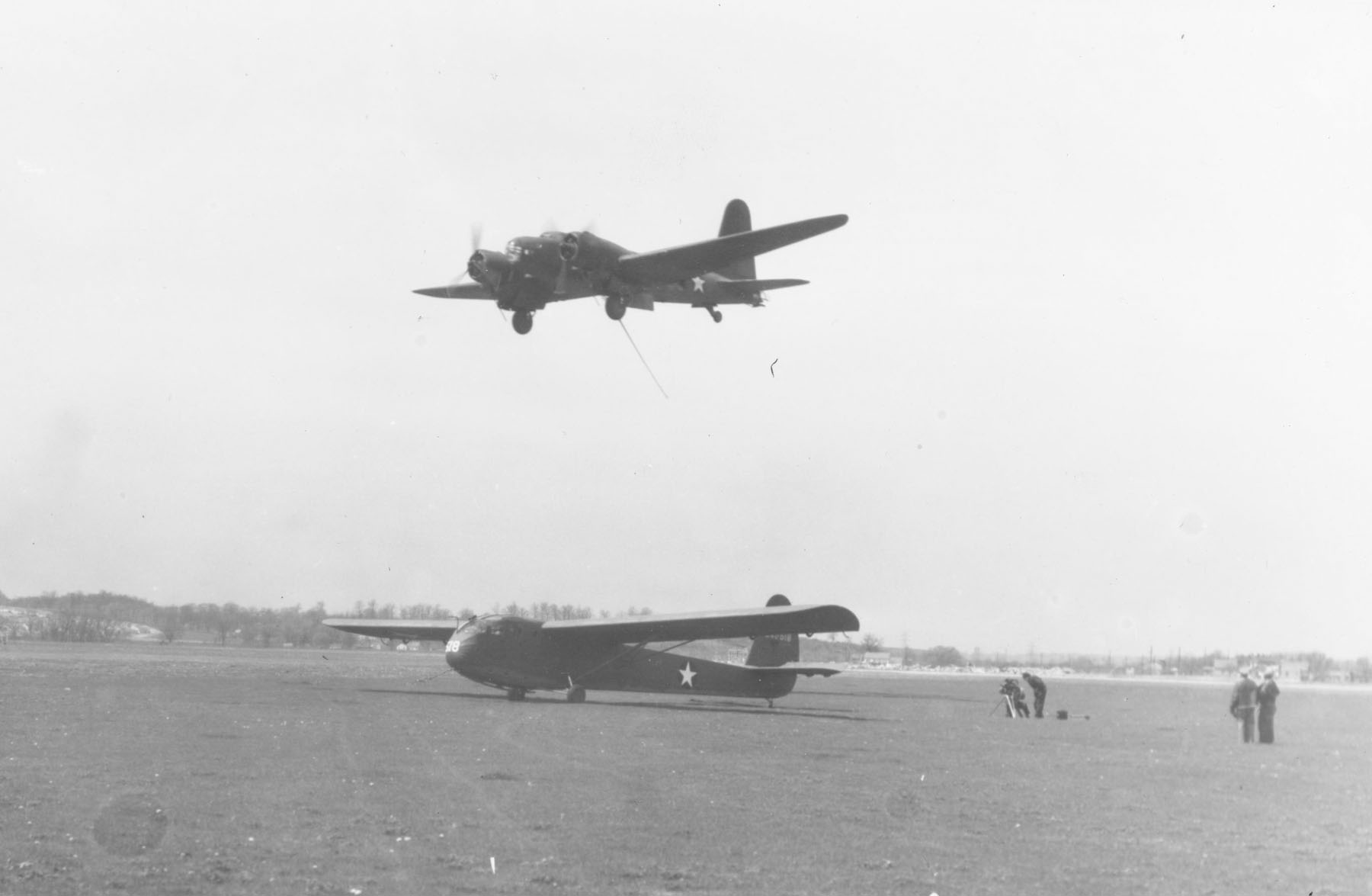
Douglas B-23 Dragon aerial pick-up test over a CG-3A glider on April 28, 1943.

Glider snatch pick-up (GSPU) was a technique used by the Allies of World War II to launch a military glider with a low-flying powered aircraft (the tow or tug), which did not have to land.

The snatching aircraft, typically a Douglas C-47 Skytrain ("Dakota"), had a 20 ft (6 m) arm hanging down at a 45-degree angle, supporting a hook at the tip. The hook was attached to a steel rope attached to an automatic winch containing 1000 ft (300 m) of steel cable. On the flyover, the hook engaged in a square loop of a nylon tow rope supported on two poles about 20 ft (6 m) apart and 3 ft (1 m) off the ground. This loop was attached to a 180 ft (55 m) nylon tow rope attached to the front of the glider. The special design of the hook meant it was less likely to snag the ground but would grab the loop.

When the hook engaged in the loop, the rope initially paid out from the winch, and then gradually, a brake was automatically applied until up to about 800 ft (244 m) of cable had been paid out. This, and the stretch in the nylon rope, reduced shock loading to less than 1 g for a duration of around 3 to 6 seconds, by which time the glider would be airborne. The steel wire was then winched in. It was possible for one plane to pick up two gliders in this way, in two passes. Gliders could be retrieved for re-use in this way after combat operations.

Some casualties were evacuated from the D-Day landings back to the United Kingdom using this technique. Several rescues of downed aircraft passengers were also performed by landing gliders to pick up survivors and then snatching them from remote locations.

== See also ==
- Fulton surface-to-air recovery system
- Glossary of gliding and soaring
- Index of aviation articles
- List of aviation, avionics, aerospace and aeronautical abbreviations
- 1945 New Guinea Gremlin Special rescue
