= Rule of thirds (military) =

Rule of thumb regarding the distribution of available manpower

The rule of thirds is a rule of thumb used when planning for the deployment and usage of a military organization. According to this principle, one third of the total military forces involved should be available for operations, one third should be preparing for operations, and the final third, having been on operations, should be recuperating. Ideally, units and individuals regularly will rotate through each of the three phases.

== Variations and implications ==
Different nations and militaries will vary the rule of thirds according to their own financial and manpower situations.

At times of financial constraint, rather than increasing the total number of forces, one temptation of politicians is to attempt to increase available manpower by folding together the preparation and recuperation phases, creating a rule of halves. A rule of halves was actually the basis of British Army planning during the British Empire, with each regiment consisting of a pair of battalions which would take turns recruiting, training and recuperating in the UK, and then being deployed overseas. However, because of the nature of transportation in the past, each of the phases at that time were longer (being a year or more) than is currently the case. Departing from a three-phase rotation for short periods is not impossible, but prolonged deployment is detrimental both to the psychological health of service personnel, and to the operational life of equipment, leading to an unwanted turnover in personnel, and to premature failure of equipment. For those military operations that are able to afford it, going to a four- or five-phase rotation schedule actually increases a nation's ability to conduct sustained military operations, even though it may appear that the majority of its servicemen are not doing anything.

As a critical cornerstone of their defence policies, the British and French submarine-launched ballistic missile forces uses a rule of fourths, where one submarine is on patrol, one is preparing to go on patrol, one returns from patrol, and the fourth is in maintenance. This force structure ensures that they will always have at least one ballistic missile boat on patrol at any one time.

The United States, in order to keep the maximum number of its submarines available at any one time, assigns two crews, called gold and blue, to each of its submarines, with the submarines themselves having a turnaround time that is as short as possible. However, the United States is one of the few nations that can afford both the manpower costs of doing this, while still being able to ensure that enough boats are in service to have the ability regularly to stagger boats out for deep maintenance without appreciably affecting the total number available.
