= Coefficient of moment =

The coefficients used for moment are similar to coefficients of lift, drag, and thrust, and are likewise dimensionless; however, these must include a characteristic length, in addition to the area; the span is used for rolling or yawing moment, and the chord is used for pitching moment.
