= Airport reference point =

Geographic coordinates of an airport

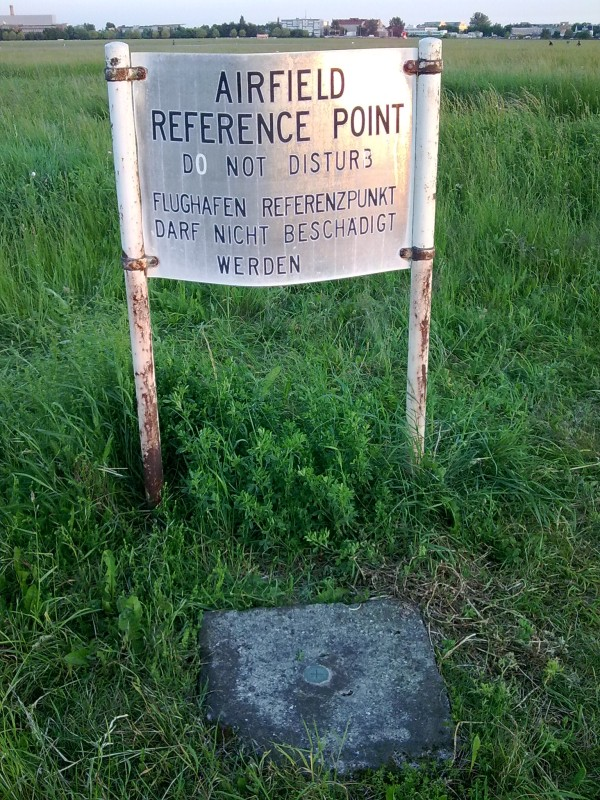
Airport reference point of the defunct Berlin Tempelhof Airport

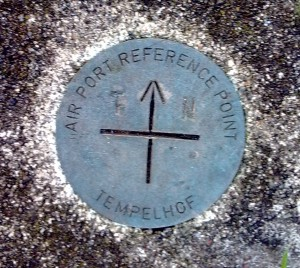
Airport reference point of the defunct Berlin Tempelhof Airport

An aerodrome reference point (ARP), in some countries airport reference point, is the designated geographical location of an aerodrome. The geographic coordinates of an ARP are part of an aerodrome's entry in the AIP.

Internationally, the rules governing the establishment of an aerodrome reference point are defined by the ICAO in section 2.2 of Annex 14 to the Convention on International Civil Aviation. They state that:

2.2.1 An aerodrome reference point shall be established for an aerodrome.

2.2.2 The aerodrome reference point shall be located near the initial or planned geometric centre of the aerodrome and shall normally remain where first established.

2.2.3 The position of the aerodrome reference point shall be measured and reported to the aeronautical information services authority in degrees, minutes and seconds.

— ICAO, Annex 14 to the Convention on International Civil Aviation,

In the United States, the term airport reference point is used and defined as "the approximate geometric center of all usable runway surfaces", computed as a weighted average of the end of runway coordinates. The calculation references the lowest absolute value to not compute negative moments.

Airports without hard surfaces are often not required to be surveyed, therefore the position of the ARP is approximated.
