= Obstacle-free zone =

Volume of airspace below 150 feet and above the established airport elevation

The obstacle-free zone (OFZ) is a 3D volume of airspace below 150 feet (46 m), above the established airport elevation which protects for the transition of aircraft to and from the runway. The Obstacle Free Zone (OFZ) clearing standard precludes taxiing and parked airplanes and object penetrations, except for frangible navigation aid (NAVAID) locations that are fixed by function. It is centered above the runway and the extended runway centerline and is intended to provide clearance protection for aircraft landing or taking off from the runway and for missed approaches. The OFZ is subdivided into:

- Runway OFZ, the airspace above a surface centered on the runway centerline
- Inner-approach OFZ, centered on the extended runway centerline and applicable only to runways with an approach lighting system
- Inner-transitional OFZ, the airspace above the surface located on the outer edges of the runway OFZ and the inner-approach OFZ; applicable only to runways with an approach visibility minimum lower than 3/4 mile (1.2 km)

== See also ==
- Index of aviation articles
