= VFR-on-top =

In United States aviation, VFR-on-top is defined as air traffic control authorization for an aircraft operating under instrument flight rules (IFR) to do so in visual meteorological conditions (VMC) at any appropriate visual flight rules (VFR) altitude.

== Usage ==
VFR-on-top permits pilot operation above, below, between cloud layers, or in areas where visual meteorological conditions can be met. This allows pilots to climb through visual obscurations such as cloud, haze, and smoke, select a preferred altitude or flight level, or cancel their IFR flight plan. Certain airspaces, such as a Class A airspace, do not permit VFR-on-top.

While flying VFR-on-top, pilots are required to stay in an appropriate VFR altitude, maintain the required VFR visibility and cloud clearance requirement, while comply with other IFR requirements (minimum IFR altitudes, position reporting, radio communications, course to be flown, adherence to ATC clearance, etc).

== Communication ==
Pilots must request air traffic controllers (ATC) to obtain the VFR-on-top clearance. ATC authorization will include a cloud top report and a request to report upon reaching the top; it may also include a clearance limit, routing, and an alternative clearance if VFR-on-top is not reached by a specified altitude. Pilots operating on a VFR-on-top clearance must advise ATC before any altitude change.

Although IFR separation is not applied, controllers must continue to provide traffic advisories and safety alerts, and apply merging target procedures to aircraft operating VFR‐on‐top.

== Compared to VFR Over-The-Top ==
VFR over-the-top is different from VFR-on-top, in that VFR-on-top is an IFR clearance that allows the pilot to fly VFR altitudes, while VFR over-the-top is strictly a VFR operation in which the pilot maintains VFR cloud clearance requirements while operating on top of an undercast layer.
