= Rule of threes (survival) =

Rules of thumb for survival in the wild

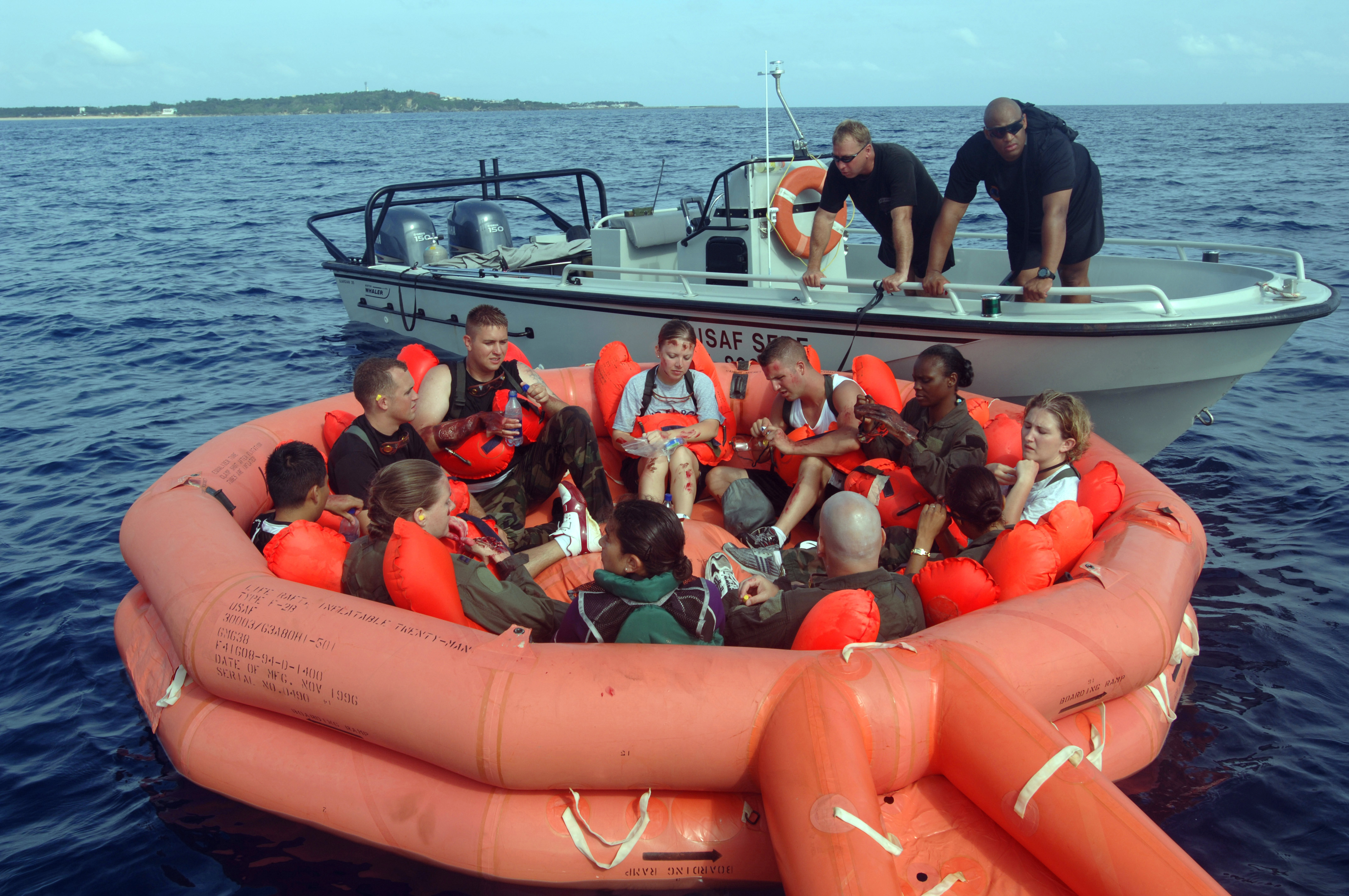
Training in use of a liferaft – the rule will apply when exposed at sea

In survival, the rule of threes involves the priorities in order to survive. The rule, depending on where one lives, may assist in effectively preparing for emergencies and helping one make decisions when injured or the environment poses a danger.

== Rule ==
Typically, the rule of threes contains the following:

- One can survive three minutes without breathable air (unconsciousness).
- One can survive three hours without shelter in a harsh environment (i.e. extreme heat or cold).
- One can survive three days without drinkable water.
- One can survive three weeks without food.

Each line assumes that the one(s) before it are met. For example, if you have a large quantity of food and water but are exposed to the environment, then the harsh conditions rule applies. The rule may sometimes be useful in determining the order of priority when in a life-threatening situation, and is a generalization (or rule of thumb), not scientifically accurate.

There may be additional generalizations presented with the rule, though they are not considered part of the rule of threes, and are usually not scientifically accurate. For example, it might be said that it takes three seconds of reaction time to make a decision during an emergency, that one can survive 3 minutes in icy water, or that an individual can last three months without hope (or companionship).

== Accuracy ==
=== Air ===
The average person can hold their breath for about 30 to 90 seconds Free divers can go two or three minutes if necessary, which could give lie to the rule of thumb that in a survival situation, a person could go three minutes without air. (Extraordinary times in the 10 minute range are found among cultures that frequently dive underwater from childhood on, and the world record of 29 minutes was achieved with a very specific regimen of oxygen exposure leading up the attempt

=== Water ===
The amount of time a person can survive without a source of water (including food which contains water) depends on the individual person and the temperature. As temperature increases, so does water loss, decreasing the amount of time a person can survive without water. The likely source of the "3 days" number is an experiment by two scientists in 1944, when they ate only dry food for a period of time; one ended the experiment at 3 days in, and the other at 4 days in. However since they stopped the experiment before being in any real danger, the actual survival time at room temperature likely exceeds 3–4 days.

Without shelter, and temperatures greater than room temperature, dehydration can occur very quickly, and death can occur in a matter of hours rather than days. In these cases people typically die of heat stroke first, not terminal dehydration. One person was purported to survive seven days in the desert, six of these without water, without suffering heat stroke, as the temperature reached no higher than 103.2 °F (39.6 °C) during his ordeal. However, he had reached the third stage of dehydration, which is 80–90% fatal; this likely represents an upper limit of survival at high temperatures.

=== Food ===
Many people have gone for over 40 days during fasting and have survived in favorable circumstances. The record, under medical supervision and with the aid of fat stores, tea, coffee, electrolytes, yeast extract, and vitamins, is 382 days.
