= Performance and weather minima =

Performance and weather minima generally relates to the worst conditions and lowest performance in which operations can be permitted. Performance is dependant both on weather and on the altitude of an airfield.

== See also ==
- Required navigation performance
- Reduced lateral separation minima
- Flight plan
