= Glossary of gliding and soaring =

This is a glossary of acronyms, initialisms and terms used for gliding and soaring. This is a specialized subset of broader aviation, aerospace, and aeronautical terminology. Additional definitions can be found in the FAA Glider Flying Handbook.

A/C
aircraft
ACFT
aircraft
AGL
above ground level
AHRS
Attitude and heading reference system
AIP
Aeronautical Information Publication
AIRAC
Aeronautical information regulation and control
ALT
Altitude
AME
Aviation Medical Examiner
AMO
Approved Maintenance Organization
AMSL
above mean sea level
AOA
angle of attack
ARC
airworthiness review certificate
ASI
airspeed indicator
ASL
above sea level
ATC
air traffic control
BGA
British Gliding Association
bhp
brake horsepower
CAA
Civil Aviation Authority
CAMO
Continuing Airworthiness Management Organisation
CFI
Certified Flight Instructor or Chief Flying Instructor
CG
center of gravity
CofA
Certificate of airworthiness
EASA
European Aviation Safety Agency
ELT
emergency locator transmitter
FAA
Federal Aviation Administration
FAI
Fédération Aéronautique Internationale, the world governing body for air sports
FL
flight level
FPM
feet per minute
GA
general aviation
GSPU
Glider snatch pick-up
IAS
indicated airspeed
IFR
instrument flight rules
IVSM
International Vintage Sailplane Meet - meeting for vintage gliders in the USA
JAA
Joint Aviation Authorities
JAR
Joint Aviation Requirements
JWGC
Junior World Gliding Championships
knot
A unit of speed. While the knot is commonly used in aviation and other contexts as an abbreviation of nautical miles per hour, in soaring the knot is also used to describe lift (and sink conditions). Using approximations, one knot of upward velocity in a thermal equates to roughly 100 feet per minute of climb.
LOA
letter of authorization or agreement
L/D
Lift-to-drag ratio
M-ASA
Mid-Atlantic Soaring Association
MSL
mean sea level
MTOW
maximum take-off weight
NOTAM
notice to airmen
OGN
Open Glider Network project
OAT
outside air temperature
OLC
Online Contest. A moderated forum that allows subscribers from various countries and regions to compete individually and as teams in flying contests.
PPL
private pilot licence
PPR
prior permission required, eg to land at another airfield
PTT
push to talk
QFE
the Q-code for: Atmospheric pressure at aerodrome elevation (or at runway threshold)
QNE
the Q-code for pressure altitude
QNH
the Q-code for: Altimeter sub-scale setting to obtain elevation when on the ground, i.e. altitude above MSL
RAFGSA
Royal Air Force Gliding & Soaring Association
SSA
Soaring Society of America
SSF
Soaring Safety Foundation - Training and safety arm of the Soaring Society of America
RT
radiotelephony
TAS
true airspeed
TMA
Terminal manoeuvring area (Europe)/inal control area (USA and Canada)
TMG
touring motor glider
TMZ
transponder mandatory zone
TP
turning point
TRA
temporary reserved area (airspace)
UTC
Universal Time Coordinated
VFR
visual flight rules
VHF
very high frequency
VMC
visual meteorological conditions
Va
maneuvering speed
Vne
never-exceed speed
Vra
Rough Air Speed
WDA
World Distance Award for US pilots to encourage cross-country flying
WGC
World Gliding Championships
WWGC
Women's World Gliding Championships
XC
cross-country
XPDR
transponder
Z
Zulu Time (UTC)
