= Golden ratio (disambiguation) =

The golden ratio is approximately 1.618 : 1. Golden ratio may also refer to:

- The Golden Ratio (album), 2010 pop music album by Ace of Base
- Golden Ratio (song), 2021 electronic music track by Hayden Thorpe
- Golden ratio base, numeral system
