= List of transponder codes =

The following list shows specific aeronautical transponder codes (typically called squawk codes), and ranges of codes, that have been used for specific purposes in various countries. Traditionally, each country has allocated transponder codes by their own scheme with little commonality across borders. The list is retained for historic interest.

Pilots are normally required to apply the code, allocated by air traffic control, to that specific flight. Occasionally, countries may specify generic codes to be used in the absence of an allocated code. Such generic codes are specified in that country's Aeronautical Information Manual or Aeronautical Information Publication. There also are standard transponder codes for defined situations defined by the International Civil Aviation Organization (marked below as ICAO).

Transponder codes shown in this list in the color RED are for emergency use only such as an aircraft hijacking, radio communication failure or another type of emergency.

Code	Countries	Allocated use
0000	Europe	Non-discrete mode A code; shall not be used.
0000	UK	Mode C or other SSR failure
0000	US	Should never be assigned.
0000	US	Military intercept code.
0000	US	Internal ARTCC subsets assigned by Enroute Safety and Operations Support. (Blocks of discrete codes except that xx00 is used as a non-discrete code after all discrete codes are assigned.)
0021	Germany	(VFR squawk code for airspace 5,000 feet (1,500 m) and below prior to 15 March 2007 when replaced by the international 7000 code for VFR traffic.)
0021	UK	Fixed-wing aircraft (Receiving service from a ship)
0022	Germany	(VFR squawk code for airspace above 5,000 feet (1,500 m) – prior to 15 March 2007 when replaced by the international 7000 code for VFR traffic.)
0022	UK	Helicopter(s) (Receiving service from a ship)
0025	Germany	Parachute dropping in progress.
0033	UK	Parachute dropping in progress.
0041–0057	Belgium	Assigned for VFR traffic under Flight Information Services (BXL FIC).
0100	Australia	Flights operating at aerodromes (in lieu of codes 1200, 2000 or 3000 when assigned by ATC or noted in the Enroute Supplement).
0100–0400	US	Allocated to Service Area Operations for assignment for use by Terminal/CERAP/industry/unique purpose/experimental activities.
0100–0700	US	Non-discrete code assignments in accordance with FAA Order JO 7110.65, 5-2.
0100–0700	US	Also for use in oceanic airspace unless another code is assigned by ATC.
0500, 0600, 0700	US	External ARTCC subsets. (Blocks of discrete codes except that xx00 is used as a non-discrete code after all discrete codes are assigned.)
1000	Canada	Instrument Flight Rules (IFR) flight below 18,000 ft ASL when no other code has been assigned.
1000	ICAO	Non-discrete mode A code reserved use in mode S radar/ADS-B environment where the aircraft identification will be used to correlate the flight plan instead of the mode A code.
1000	US	Used exclusively by ADS-B aircraft to inhibit mode 3A transmission.
1000	US	Non-discrete code assignments in accordance with FAA Order JO 7110.65, 5-2. Also for use in oceanic airspace unless another code is assigned by ATC (US).
1000	US	External ARTCC subset. (Block of discrete codes except that xx00 is used as a non-discrete code after all discrete codes are assigned.)
1100	US	Non-discrete code assignments in accordance with FAA Order JO 7110.65, 5-2. Also for use in oceanic airspace unless another code is assigned by ATC.
1100	US	External ARTCC subset. (Block of discrete codes except that xx00 is used as a non-discrete code after all discrete codes are assigned.)
1200	Australia	Civil VFR flights in class E or G airspace.
1200	Canada, US	Visual flight rules (VFR) flight standard squawk code used in North American airspace when no other has been assigned or is applicable.
1201	US	Assigned via FAR 93.95 for use by VFR aircraft in the immediate vicinity of LAX.
1201	US	(Visual flight rules (VFR) glider operations for gliders not in contact with ATC, through February 2012.)
1202	US	Visual flight rules (VFR) glider operations for gliders not in contact with ATC; effective February 2012.
1202	Canada	Visual flight rules (VFR) glider operations for gliders not in contact with ATC; effective February 2017.
1203–1272	US	Discrete 1200 series codes unless otherwise allocated (for example, 1255), designated for DVFR aircraft and only assigned by a flight service station.
1255	US	Aircraft not in contact with an ATC facility while enroute to/from or within the designated fire fighting area(s).
1273–1275	US	Calibration Performance Monitoring Equipment (CPME) "Parrot" transponders.
1276	US	Air Defense Identification Zone (ADIZ) penetration when unable to establish communication with ATC or aeronautical facility.
1277	US	VFR aircraft which fly authorized SAR missions for the USAF or USCG while enroute to/from or within the designated search area.
1300	US	Non-discrete code assignments in accordance with FAA Order JO 7110.65, 5-2. Also for use in oceanic airspace, unless another code is assigned by ATC.
1300	US	External ARTCC subset. (Block of discrete codes except that xx00 is used as a non-discrete code after all discrete codes are assigned.)
1400	Canada	VFR flight above 12,500' ASL when no other code has been assigned.
1400	Japan	VFR flight above 10,000' MSL when no other code has been assigned.
1400	US	External ARTCC subset. (Block of discrete codes except that xx00 is used as a non-discrete code after all discrete codes are assigned.)
1500	US	Non-discrete code assignments in accordance with FAA Order JO 7110.65, 5-2. Also for use in oceanic airspace unless another code is assigned by ATC.
1500	US	External ARTCC subset. (Blocks of discrete codes except that xx00 is used as a non-discrete code after all discrete codes are assigned.)
1600, 1700	US	External ARTCC subsets. (Blocks of discrete codes except that xx00 is used as a non-discrete code after all discrete codes are assigned.)
2000	Australia	Civil IFR flights in class G airspace.
2000	Canada	Uncontrolled IFR at or above 18,000 ft MSL.
2000	ICAO countries	Code squawked when entering a secondary surveillance radar (SSR) area from a non-SSR area used as uncontrolled IFR flight squawk code.
2000	EASA countries	Code that pilot shall set in the absence of ATS instructions related to code setting, unless when not receiving air traffic services.
2000	US	Non-discrete code assignments in accordance with FAA Order JO 7110.65, 5-2. Also for use in oceanic airspace unless another code is assigned by ATC.
2000	US	External ARTCC subset. (Block of discrete codes except that xx00 is used as a non-discrete code after all discrete codes are assigned.)
2100	Australia	Ground testing by aircraft maintenance staff.
2100	US	Non-discrete code assignments in accordance with FAA Order JO 7110.65, 5-2.
2100	US	Also for use in oceanic airspace unless another code is assigned by ATC.
2100	US	External ARTCC subset. (Block of discrete codes except that xx00 is used as a non-discrete code after all discrete codes are assigned.)
2200, 2300, 2400	US	Non-discrete code assignments in accordance with FAA Order JO 7110.65, 5-2.
2200, 2300, 2400	US	Also for use in oceanic airspace unless another code is assigned by ATC.
2200, 2300, 2400	US	External ARTCC subsets. (Blocks of discrete codes except that xx00 is used as a non-discrete code after all discrete codes are assigned.)
2500, 2600, 2700	US	External ARTCC subsets. (Blocks of discrete codes except that xx00 is used as a non-discrete code after all discrete codes are assigned.)
3000	Australia	Civil flights in classes A, C and D airspace, or IFR flights in class E airspace.
3000	US	External ARTCC subset. (Block of discrete codes except that xx00 is used as a non-discrete code after all discrete codes are assigned.)
3100, 3200, 3300, 3400, 3500, 3600, 3700	US	External ARTCC subsets. (Blocks of discrete codes except that xx00 is used as a non-discrete code after all discrete codes are assigned.)
4000	Australia	Civil flights not involved in special operations or SAR, operating in class G airspace in excess of 15NM offshore.
4000	US	Aircraft on a VFR Military Training Route or requiring frequent or rapid changes in altitude.
4000	US	Non-discrete code assignments in accordance with FAA Order JO 7110.65, 5-2.
4000	US	Also for use in oceanic airspace unless another code is assigned by ATC.
4000	US	External ARTCC subsets. (Blocks of discrete codes except that xx00 is used as a non-discrete code after all discrete codes are assigned.)
4100	US	External ARTCC subsets. (Blocks of discrete codes except that xx00 is used as a non-discrete code after all discrete codes are assigned.)
4200, 4300	US	Internal ARTCC subsets assigned by Enroute Safety and Operations Support. (Blocks of discrete codes except that xx00 is used as a non-discrete code after all discrete codes are assigned.)
4400–4477	US	Reserved for use by SR-71, YF-12, U-2, B-57, pressure suit flights, and aircraft operations above FL600.
4401–4433	US	Reserved in accordance with FAA Order JO 7110.67 (Federal Law Enforcement).
4434–4437	US	Weather reconnaissance, as appropriate.
4440,4441	US	Operations above FL600 for Lockheed/NASA from Moffett Field.
4442–4446	US	Operations above FL600 for Lockheed from Air Force Plant 42.
4447–4452	US	Operations above FL600 for SR-71/U-2 operations from Edwards AFB.
4453	US	High balloon operations: National Scientific Balloon Facility in Palestine, Texas; and other providers, some in international operations.
4454–4465	US	Air Force operations above FL600 as designated in FAA Order 7610.4.
4466–4477	US	Reserved in accordance with FAA Order JO 7110.67 (Federal Law Enforcement).
4500, 4600, 4700	US	Internal ARTCC subsets assigned by Enroute Safety and Operations Support. (Blocks of discrete codes except that xx00 is used as a non-discrete code after all discrete codes are assigned.)
5000	Australia	Aircraft flying on military operations.
5000	US, Canada	Reserved for use by NORAD.
5061, 5062, 5100, 5200	US	Reserved for special use by Potomac TRACON.
5100, 5200, 5300, 5500	US	Internal ARTCC subsets assigned by Enroute Safety and Operations Support. (Blocks of discrete codes except that xx00 is used as a non-discrete code after all discrete codes are assigned.)
5100–5300	US	May be used by DOD aircraft beyond radar coverage but inside US controlled airspace with coordination as appropriate with applicable Area Operations Directorate.
5400	US, Canada	Reserved for use by NORAD.
5600, 5700	US	External ARTCC subsets. (Blocks of discrete codes except that xx00 is used as a non-discrete code after all discrete codes are assigned.)
6000	Australia	Military flights in class G airspace.
6000	US	External ARTCC subset. (Blocks of discrete codes except that xx00 is used as a non-discrete code after all discrete codes are assigned.)
6100	US, Canada	Reserved for use by NORAD.
6200, 6300	US	External ARTCC subsets. (Blocks of discrete codes except that xx00 is used as a non-discrete code after all discrete codes are assigned.)
6400	US, Canada	Reserved for use by NORAD.
6500, 6600, 6700	US	External ARTCC subsets. (Blocks of discrete codes except that xx00 is used as a non-discrete code after all discrete codes are assigned.)
7000	ICAO	VFR standard squawk code when no other code has been assigned.
7000	EASA countries	Code that pilot shall set when not receiving air traffic services, unless otherwise prescribed by the competent authority.
7000	US	External ARTCC subset. (Block of discrete codes except that xx00 is used as a non-discrete code after all discrete codes are assigned.)
7000	Australia	Unmanned aerial vehicle in all classes of airspace and when instructed to enable transponder.
7001	France	Used in some countries to identify VFR traffic.
7001	UK	Sudden military climb out from low-level operations.
7004	UK	Aerobatic and display code in some countries.
7100, 7200, 7300	US	External ARTCC subsets. (Blocks of discrete codes except that xx00 is used as a non-discrete code after all discrete codes are assigned.)
7100, 7200, 7300	Switzerland	7100 in Switzerland for SAR (REGA).
7400	US, UK, Australia	Unmanned aerial vehicle lost link.
7500	ICAO	Unlawful interference (e.g. hijacking).
7501–7577	US	Reserved for use by Continental NORAD Region (CONR).
7600	ICAO	Radio failure (lost communications).
7601	Europe	Radio failure, IFR flight in visual meteorological conditions, effective May 1st 2025.
7601–7607	US	Reserved for special use by FAA.
7610–7676	US	External ARTCC subset (block of discrete codes).
7615	Australia	Civil flights engaged in littoral zone surveillance.
7700	ICAO	Emergency.
7701–7707	US	Reserved for special use by FAA.
7710–7776	US	External ARTCC subset (block of discrete codes).
7776	Europe	The Mode A code 7776 is assigned as a test code by the ORCAM Users Group, specifically for the testing of transponders.
7777	US, Germany, UK, Belgium, Netherlands	Non-discrete code used by fixed test transponders (RABMs) to check correctness of radar stations (BITE).
7777	US	DOD interceptor aircraft on active air-defense missions and operating without ATC clearance in accordance with FAA Order 7610.4.
