= Aircraft systems =

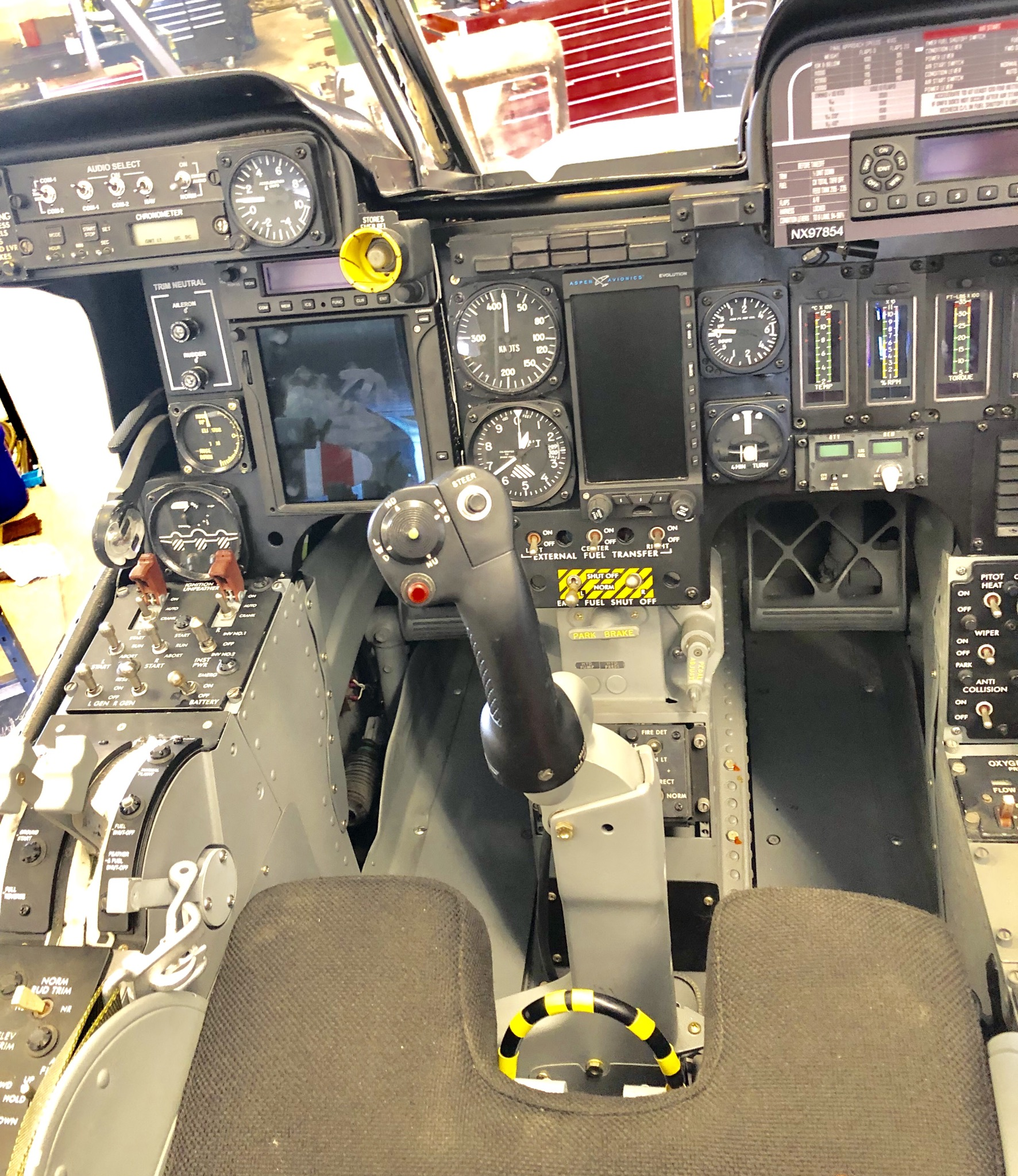
Aircraft systems include the numerous electronic devices and instruments known as avionics

Aircraft systems are those required to operate an aircraft efficiently and safely. Their complexity varies with the type of aircraft.

== Aircraft software systems ==
Aircraft software systems control, manage, and apply the subsystems that are engaged with avionics on board an aircraft.

== Flight control systems ==
Flight control systems can be manually operated or powered. They are designed to move the flight control surfaces or swashplate, allowing the pilot to maintain or change attitude as required.

== Landing gear system ==
Landing gear systems for larger aircraft are usually hydraulic for powered retraction/extension of the main legs and doors and also for braking. Anti-skid systems are used to provide maximum braking performance.

== Hydraulic system ==
A hydraulic system is required for high speed flight and large aircraft to convert the crews' control system movements to surface movements. The hydraulic system is also used to extend and retract landing gear, operate flaps and slats, operate the wheel brakes and steering systems. Hydraulic systems consist of engine driven pumps, fluid reservoirs, oil coolers, valves and actuators. Redundancy for safety is often provided by the use of multiple, isolated systems.

== Electrical system ==
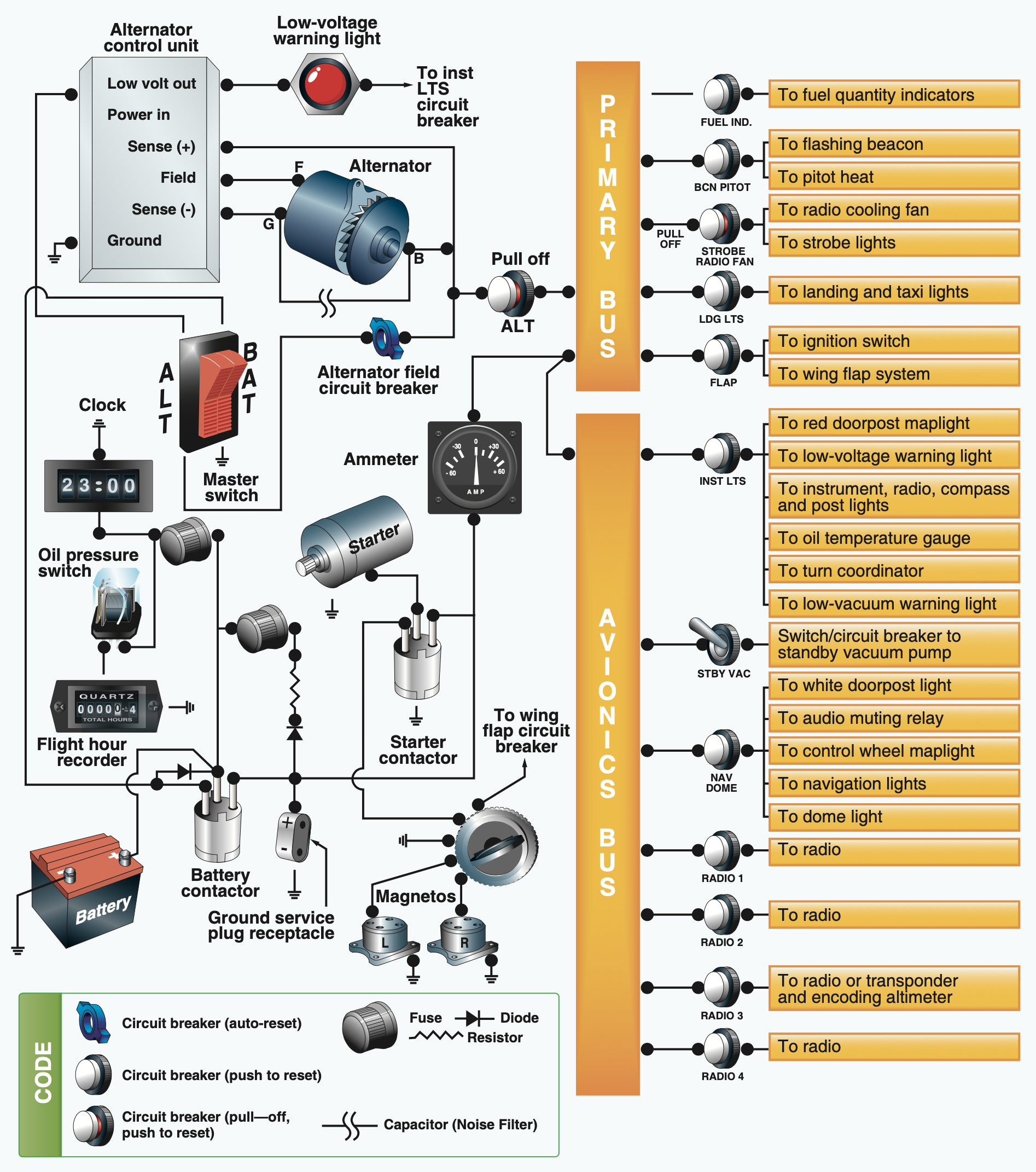
Aircraft electrical system schematic.

The electrical system generally consist of a battery, generator or alternator, switches, circuit breakers and instruments such as voltmeters and ammeters. Back up electrical supply can be provided by a ram air turbine (RAT) or Hydrazine powered turbines.

== Engine bleed air system ==
Bleed air is compressed air taken from the compressor stage of a gas turbine engine upstream of its fuel-burning sections. It is used for several purposes which include cabin pressurisation, cabin heating or cooling, boundary layer control (BLC), ice protection and pressurisation of fuel tanks.

== Avionics ==
Aircraft avionic systems encompass a wide range of electrical and electronic systems that include flight instruments, radios, and navigation systems.

== Environmental control system or Cabin control system ==
Aircraft environmental control systems (ECS) provide cabin pressurisation and heating while also providing cooling for electronic systems such as radar.

== Fuel systems ==
An aircraft fuel system is designed to store and deliver aviation fuel to the propulsion system and auxiliary power unit (APU) if equipped. Fuel systems differ greatly due to different performance of the aircraft in which they are installed.

== Propulsion systems ==
Propulsion systems encompass engine installations and their controls. Sub-systems include fire detection and protection and thrust reversal.

== Ice protection systems ==
Aircraft that regularly operate in icing conditions have systems to detect and prevent ice forming (anti-icing) and/or remove the ice accumulation after it has formed (de-icing). This can be achieved by heating the spaces in internal structure with engine bleed air, chemical treatment, electrical heating and expansion/contraction of the skin using de-icing boots.

== See also ==
- Index of aviation articles
