= Aerodrome mapping database =

Information systems for mapping airport locations

An aerodrome mapping database is a geographic information system (GIS) database to describe airports. The following standards have been defined by the RTCA and EUROCAE:

- RTCA DO-272A/EUROCAE ED-99A: User requirements for aerodrome mapping information
- RTCA DO-291/EUROCAE ED-119: Interchange standards for terrain, obstacle, and aerodrome mapping data
