= VFR over-the-top =

VFR over-the-top (OTT) refers to flying over top of clouds in visual flight, rather than with reference to instruments. This is usually done for brief amount of time to avoid weather or turbulence.

== Regulations ==
Each nation has specific and often different rules that govern when a pilot is permitted to fly VFR OTT. Most countries have requirements that specify weather minima, aircraft equipment and pilot qualifications.

In some countries pilots are required to get an air traffic control (ATC) clearance, or in absence of a controller, advise the nearest flight service station or center.

Pilots are required to adhere to VFR minima when climbing and descending over the clouds. Flight in cloud is not permitted.

== National differences ==
The rules for flying VFR OTT vary greatly from country to country. Some rules, such as those contained in the US Federal Aviation Regulations, are less restrictive. Others, such as the Canadian VFR OTT regulations contained in the Canadian Aviation Regulations, have more regulations to comply with.

=== United States ===
The US rules require the aircraft to be fitted with the instruments required for IFR flight, and student pilots and sport pilots must maintain visual reference with the surface. Other operations (such as commercial, turbine powered, and fractional ownership) include special limitations. (Note that 14 CFR 91.507 applies only to fractional operations; see 91.501.)

=== Canada ===
The Canadian rules specify that an aircraft may be operated in VFR OTT flight during the cruise portion of the flight during the day, at a vertical distance from clouds of at least 1000 feet. When the aircraft is operated between two cloud layers, the vertical distance between the layers must be at least 5000 feet. The flight visibility at the cruising altitude of the aircraft must be at least 5 miles and the weather at the destination aerodrome must be forecast to have a sky condition of scattered cloud or better, a ground visibility of 5 miles or greater with no forecast of precipitation, fog, thunderstorm or blowing snow, and that these conditions must be forecast to exist for one hour before to two hours after the estimated time of arrival when a terminal aerodrome forecast (TAF) is available or from one hour before to three hours after the estimated time of arrival if a TAF is not available.

The VFR OTT rating requires ground training and a minimum of 15 hours of instrument training, 5 of those can be in a simulator. Commercial pilots automatically receive the OTT rating.

=== Germany ===
In Germany VFR OTT (Flüge nach Sichtflugregeln über Wolkendecken) is allowed and regulated in §32 LuftVO. The requirements are:

1. minimum height of 1,000 ft (305 m) above ground or water, minimum weather requirements for airspace E met
2. pilot is capable of keeping the planned course
3. approach and landing at destination in visual meteorological conditions (VMC)
4. pilot possesses radiotelephony license

Additionally the aircraft must be equipped with a VOR receiver or basic RNAV equipment.

== See also ==
- VFR-on-top
