= Wing tip =

Part of an aircraft

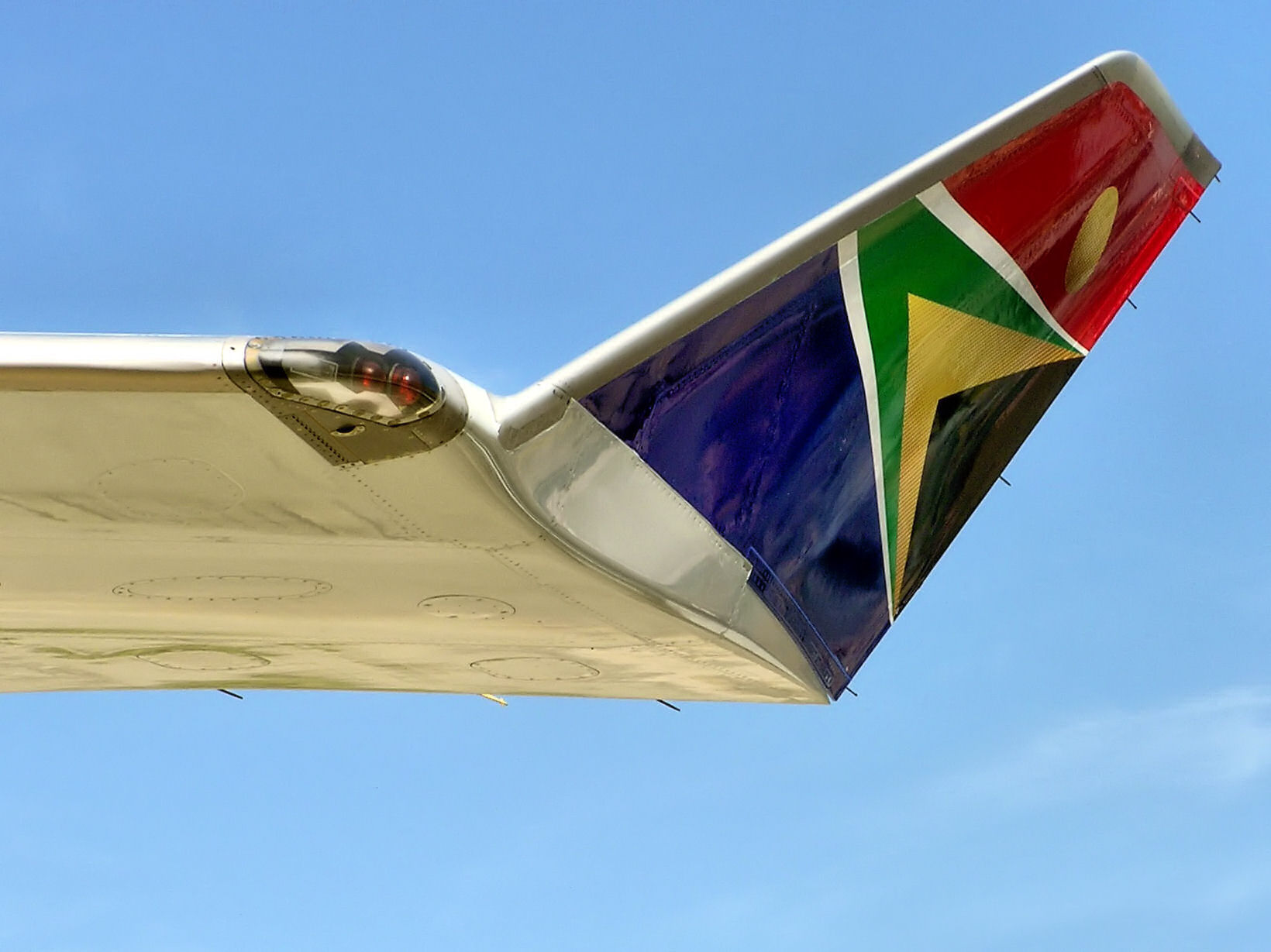
The winglet and red navigation light on the wing tip of a South African Airways Boeing 747-400

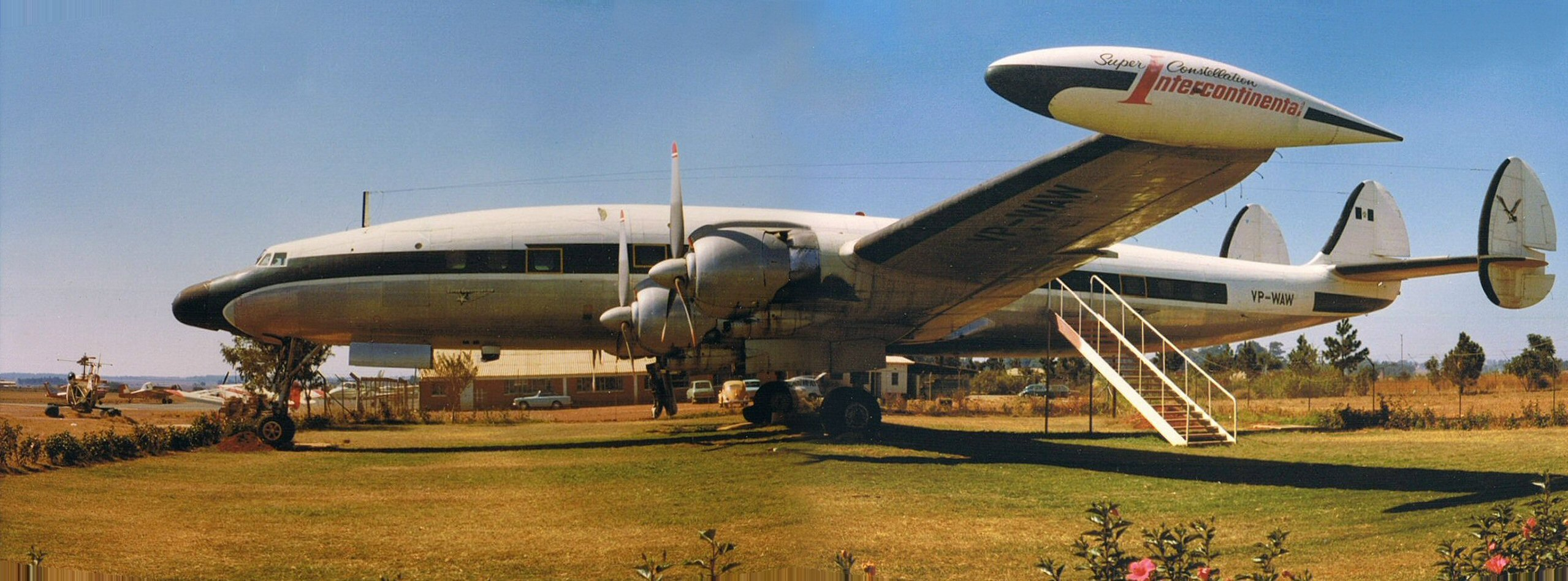
Many aircraft types, such as the Lockheed Super Constellation shown here, have fuel tanks mounted on the wing tips, commonly called tip tanks

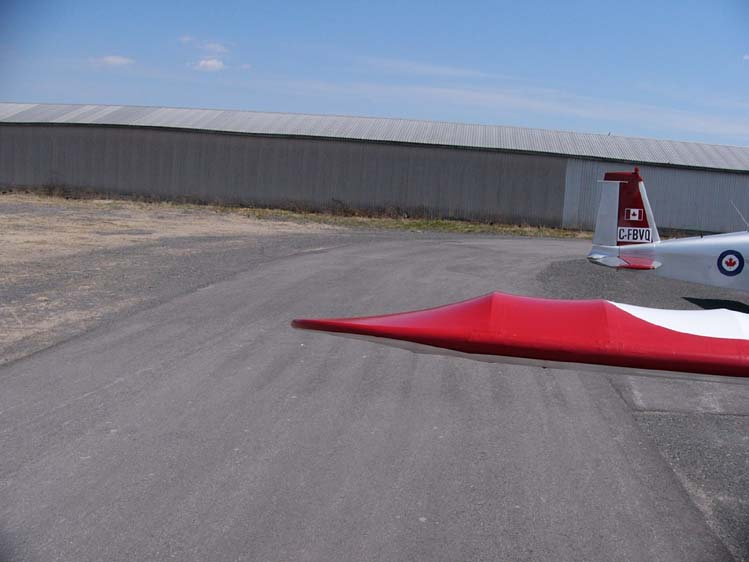
The wing tip of a Quad City Challenger II, formed with an aluminum bow

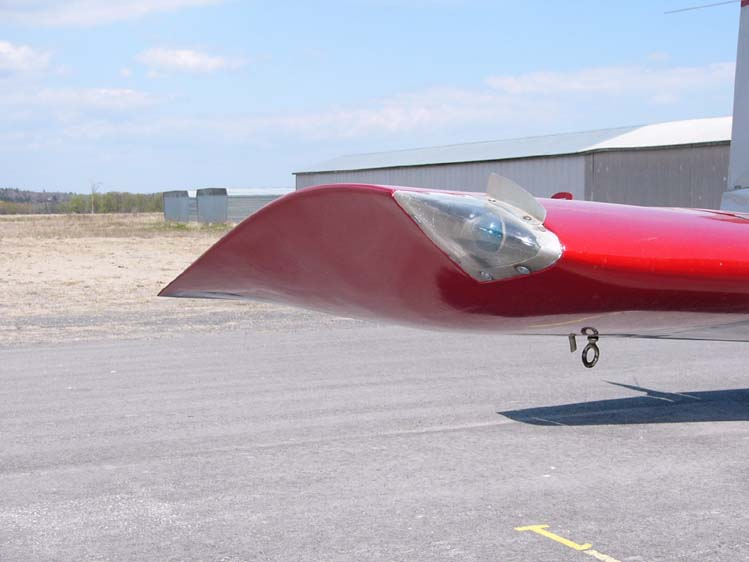
The wing tip of a Grumman American AA-1, showing its Hoerner style design

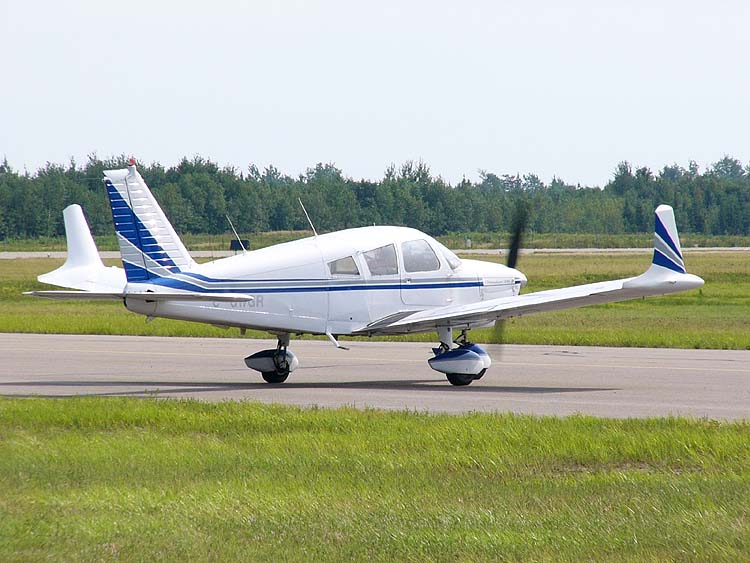
A Piper PA-28 Cherokee with winglets

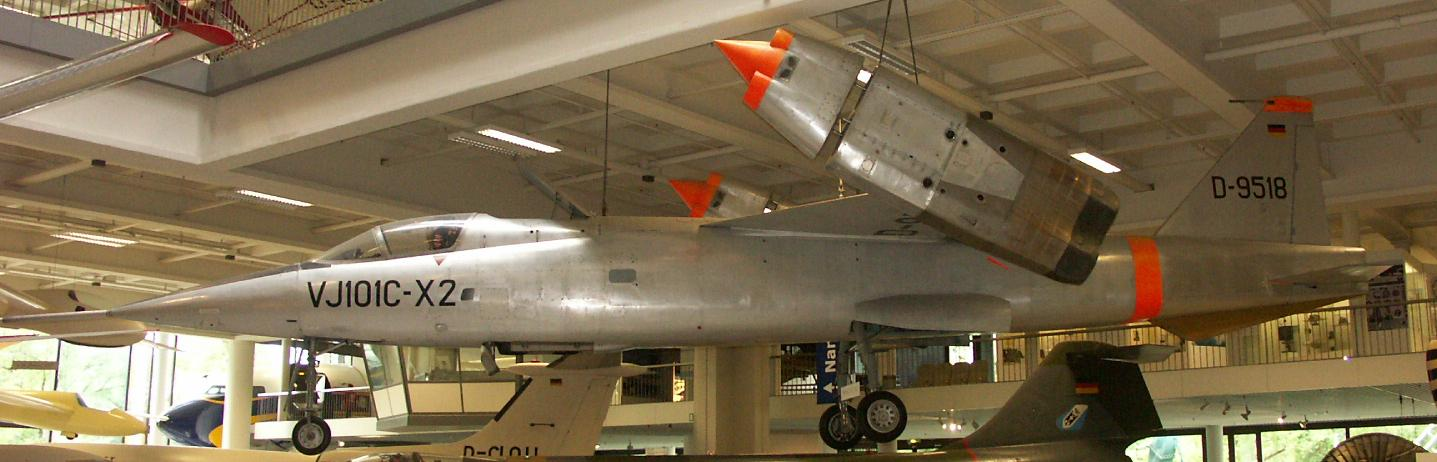
Wingtip mounted engines

A wing tip (or wingtip) is the part of the wing that is most distant from the fuselage of a fixed-wing aircraft.

Because the wing tip shape influences the size and drag of the wingtip vortices, tip design has produced a diversity of shapes, including:

- Squared-off
- Aluminium tube bow
- Rounded
- Hoerner style
- Winglets
- Drooped tips
- Raked wingtips
- Tip tanks
- Sails
- Fences
- End plates

Winglets have become popular additions to high speed aircraft to increase fuel efficiency by reducing drag from wingtip vortices. In lower speed aircraft, the effect of the wingtip shape is less apparent, with only a marginal performance difference between round, square, and Hoerner style tips. The slowest speed aircraft, STOL aircraft, may use wingtips to shape airflow for controllability at low airspeeds.

Wing tips are also an expression of aircraft design style, so their shape may be influenced by marketing considerations as well as by aerodynamic requirements.

Wing tips are often used by aircraft designers to mount navigation lights, anti-collision strobe lights, landing lights, handholds, and identification markings.

Wing tip tanks can act as a winglet and distribute weight more evenly across the wing spar.

On fighter aircraft, they may also be fitted with hardpoints, for mounting drop tanks and weapons systems, such as missiles and electronic countermeasures. Wingtip mounted hose/drogue systems allow Aerial refueling of multiple aircraft with separation.

Aerobatic aircraft use wingtip mounted crosses for visual attitude reference. Wingtip mounted smoke systems and fireworks highlight rolling aerobatic maneuvers. Some airshow acts feature the pilot touching or dragging the wingtip along the ground.

Aircraft with a single main landing gear or very high aspect ratio wings such as gliders, may place small landing gear in the wingtips. Some uncommon designs, like the Rutan Quickie, and Convair XFY placed the main landing gear in the wingtips. Some early World War I aircraft used wooded skids on the wingtips to minimize damage on ground looping incidents.

Several amphibious aircraft such as the Consolidated PBY Catalina, use retractable wingtips as floats.

Moveable wingtips can affect the controllability of a wing. Wing warping the ends of the wing, produced roll control on the earliest of aircraft such as the Wright Flyer. The North American XB-70 Valkyrie raised and lowered its wingtips in flight to adjust its stability in supersonic and subsonic flight.

Wingtips can also house the power plant or thrust of an aircraft. The EWR VJ 101 used tip mounted jets, the V-22 uses tilting wingtip mounted engines, and the Harrier uses wingtip thrust for stability while hovering.

Rotary wing aircraft wingtips may be swept or curved to reduce noise and vibration. Some rotary wing aircraft place their propulsion in wingtip tip jets.

== Folding wingtips ==
Due to limited space within naval vessels, many naval aircraft possess folding wings and wingtips for storage purposes, minimizing the area they occupy within the ship's hangar. Some aircraft operated on land may possess a similar mechanism to allow them to fit within a small, often reinforced, hangar.

The Boeing 777X will feature 3.5 m (11 ft) folding wingtips supplied by Liebherr Aerospace from Lindenberg. The mechanism was demonstrated for Aviation Week at the Boeing Everett Factory in October 2016. The folding takes 20 seconds to complete.

== See also ==
- Wingtip device
