= Aviation light signals =

Use of visible electromagnetic radiation to conduct air traffic control

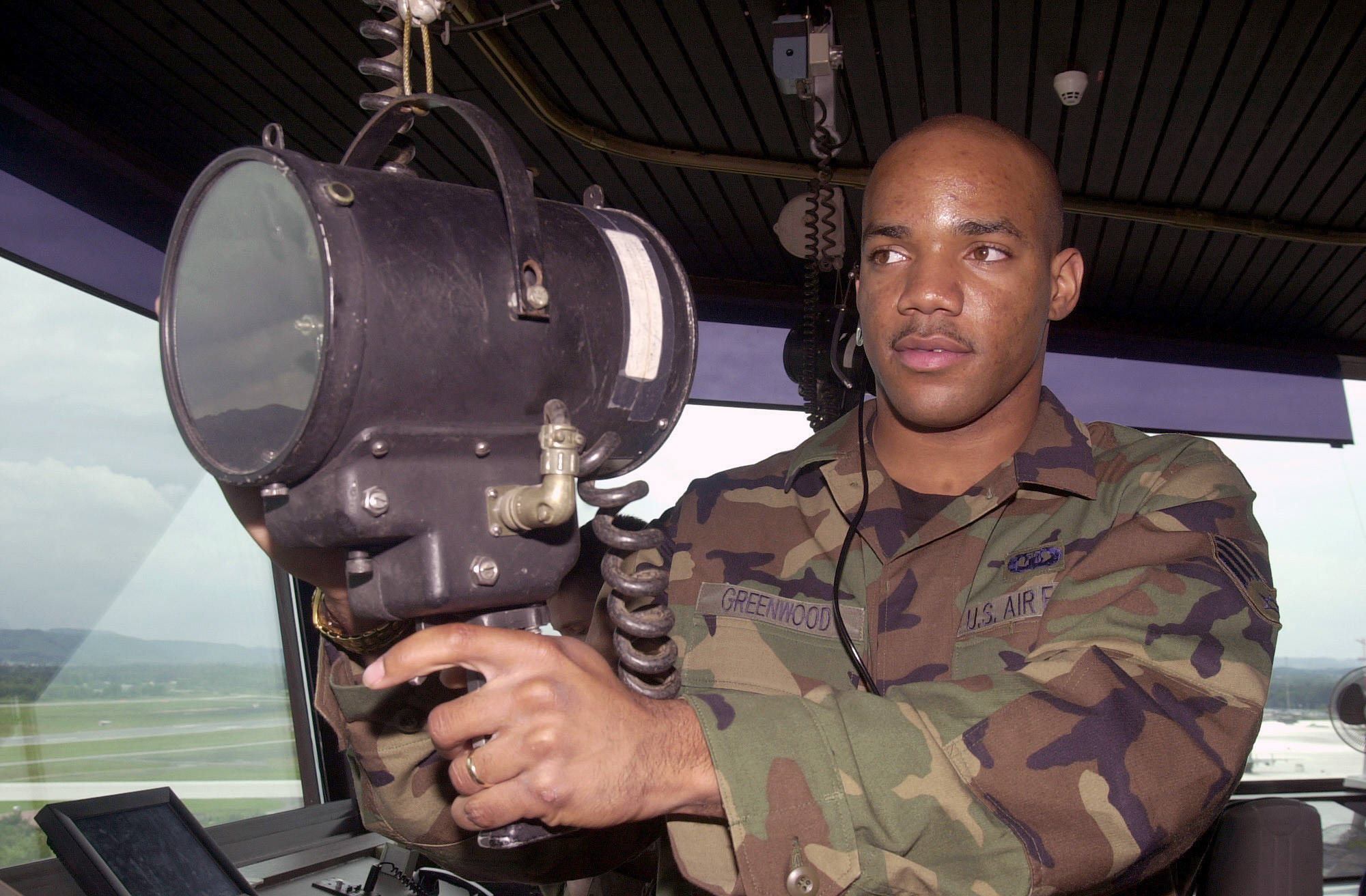
A United States Air Force airman with a signal light gun that can be used to control aircraft with radio failure.

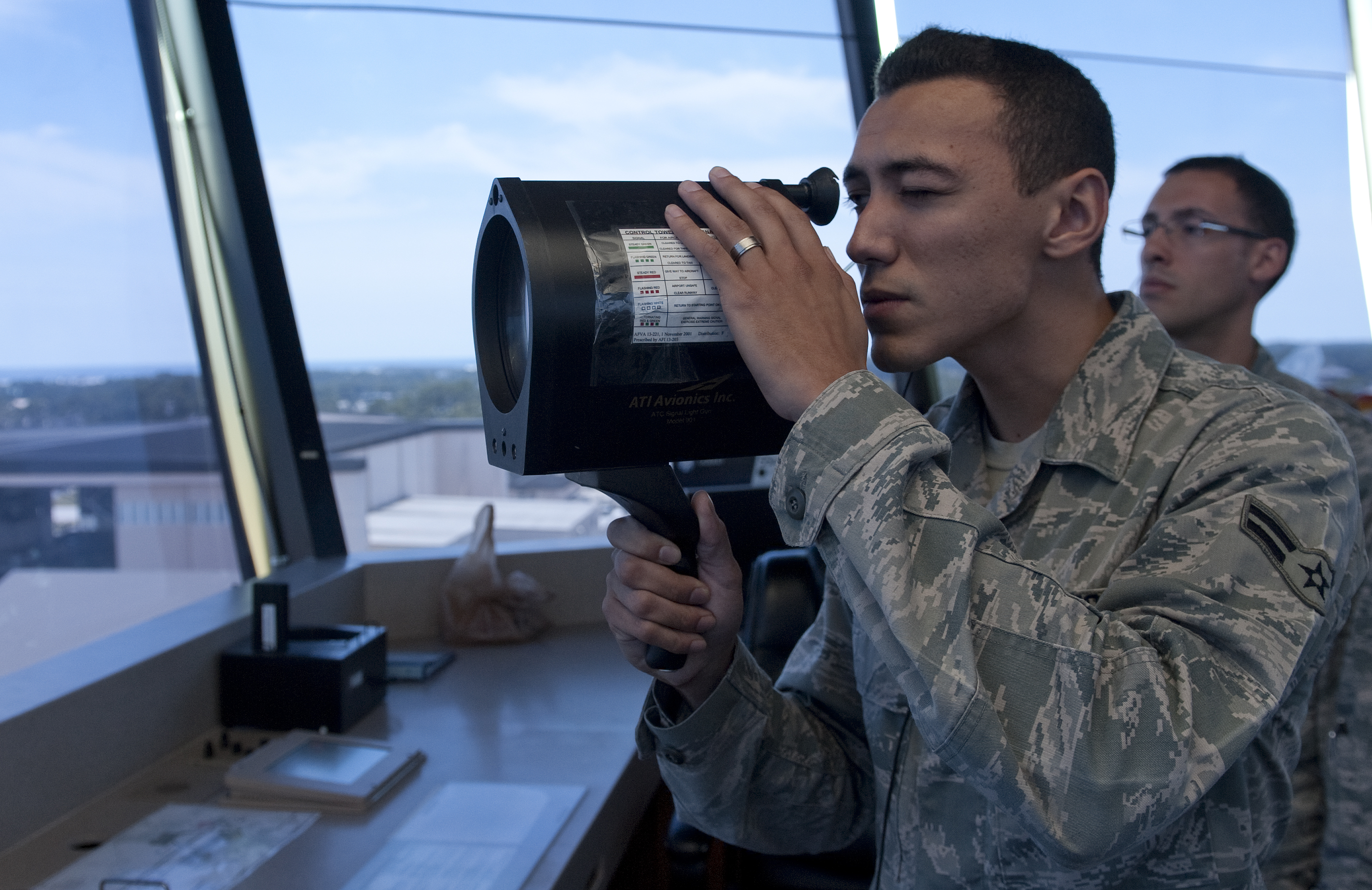
Air traffic control signal light gun in use at base flight tower

In the case of a radio failure or aircraft not equipped with a radio, or in the case of a deaf pilot, air traffic control may use a signal lamp (called a "signal light gun" or "light gun" by the FAA) to direct the aircraft. ICAO regulations require air traffic control towers to possess such signal lamps. The signal lamp has a focused bright beam and is capable of emitting three different colors: red, white and green. These colors may be flashed or steady, and have different meanings to aircraft in flight or on the ground. Planes can acknowledge the instruction by rocking their wings, moving the ailerons if on the ground, or by flashing their landing or navigation lights during hours of darkness. Air traffic control signal light guns are typically specified with a (white) center beam brightness of >180,000–200,000 candela, and are visible for roughly 4 miles (10 km) in clear daylight conditions. The table below describes the meaning of the signals. The use of handheld combination red/green/white signal lamps for air traffic control dates back to at least the 1930s.

Signal	Aircraft in flight	Aircraft on the ground	Ground vehicles or personnel
Flashing white	ICAO – Land at this airport and proceed to apron (this is not a clearance to either land or taxi. Clearances to land and taxi will follow.) FAA – Not applicable	Return to starting point on airport	Return to starting point on airport
Steady green	Cleared to land	Cleared for takeoff	Cleared to cross, proceed or go
Flashing green	Return for landing	Cleared to taxi	Not applicable
Steady red	Give way to other aircraft and continue circling	STOP	
Flashing red	Airport unsafe, do not land	Taxi clear of the runway in use	Clear the taxiway/runway
Alternating red and green	Exercise extreme caution		

== See also ==
- Formation light
- Landing light
- Navigation light
