= Airport diagram =

Airport diagram of O'Hare International Airport, United States

Airport diagrams, airport charts, or aerodrome charts are airport maps that are designed to assist ground traffic to move around complex runway and taxiway configurations.

== Regulation ==
International Civil Aviation Organization’s (ICAO) Convention on International Civil Aviation Annex 4 Aeronautical Charts Chapter 13 Aerodrome/Heliport Chart specifies that the chart "shall provide flight crews with information which information which will facilitate the ground movement of aircraft" between the aircraft stand and the runway. For helicopter movement, the chart shall provide information between the helicopter stand, the touchdown and lift-off area, and the final approach and take-off area; the chart should also supplement information along helicopter ground and air taxiways and air transit routes. In addition, essential operational information should also be provided.

In the United States, the Federal Aviation Administration (FAA) states in its Order 7910.4 that "all hard-surface public-use airports with Instrument Flight Rules procedures will have a published airport diagram."

== Content ==
Airport Diagram of Guangzhou Baiyun International Airport, China

According to ICAO, airport diagrams shall show coordinates, field elevations, runways, aprons, taxiways, hot spots, taxiway routes, air transit routes, lighting, air traffic control (ATC) service boundary, communication channels, obstacles, slope angles, buildings and service areas, VOR checkpoints, and movement area permanently unsuitable for aircraft.

In addition, an airport diagram may display information on its margin area about chart's relevance and accuracy, including airport identifier, chart type, version number, version date, etc.

=== Hot spot ===
A hot spot is a location on an airport movement area with a history or potential risk of collision or runway incursion, and where heightened attention by pilots and drivers is necessary. It is believed that this extra awareness can improve planning and navigation. Hot spots are shown on both airport diagrams and chart supplements.

An area is likely to become a hot spot if it has:

- hold short line infractions
- approach hold issues
- complex taxiway configurations
- movement-non movement boundary area issues
- tower line of sight problems
- marking and signage issues

== Usage ==
Airport diagrams is mostly used to assist taxiing around the airport and are henceforth sometimes referred to as a "taxi diagram." If pilots study the diagram prior to their arrival or departure, they can expect what runway to use and routes to take while navigating around a complex airport. When communicating with ATC, pilots will already be familiar with their routes and hence have better situation awareness. For pilots who were unable to establish radio communication with ATC, the diagram shows where the control tower is and hence where light signals may come from.

== Publication ==
In the United States, airport diagrams are published as part of Terminal Procedures Publication and are updated every 56 days unless there is a critical safety issue. In Canada, airport charts are published by Nav Canada. In Europe, while European Union Aviation Safety Agency (EASA) does not publish aerodrome charts directly, it does regulate the chart content published in Aeronautical Information Publications from its member states. Commercial providers such as Jeppesen also publish their own version of airport diagrams and can include additional airport details.

== Airport sketches ==
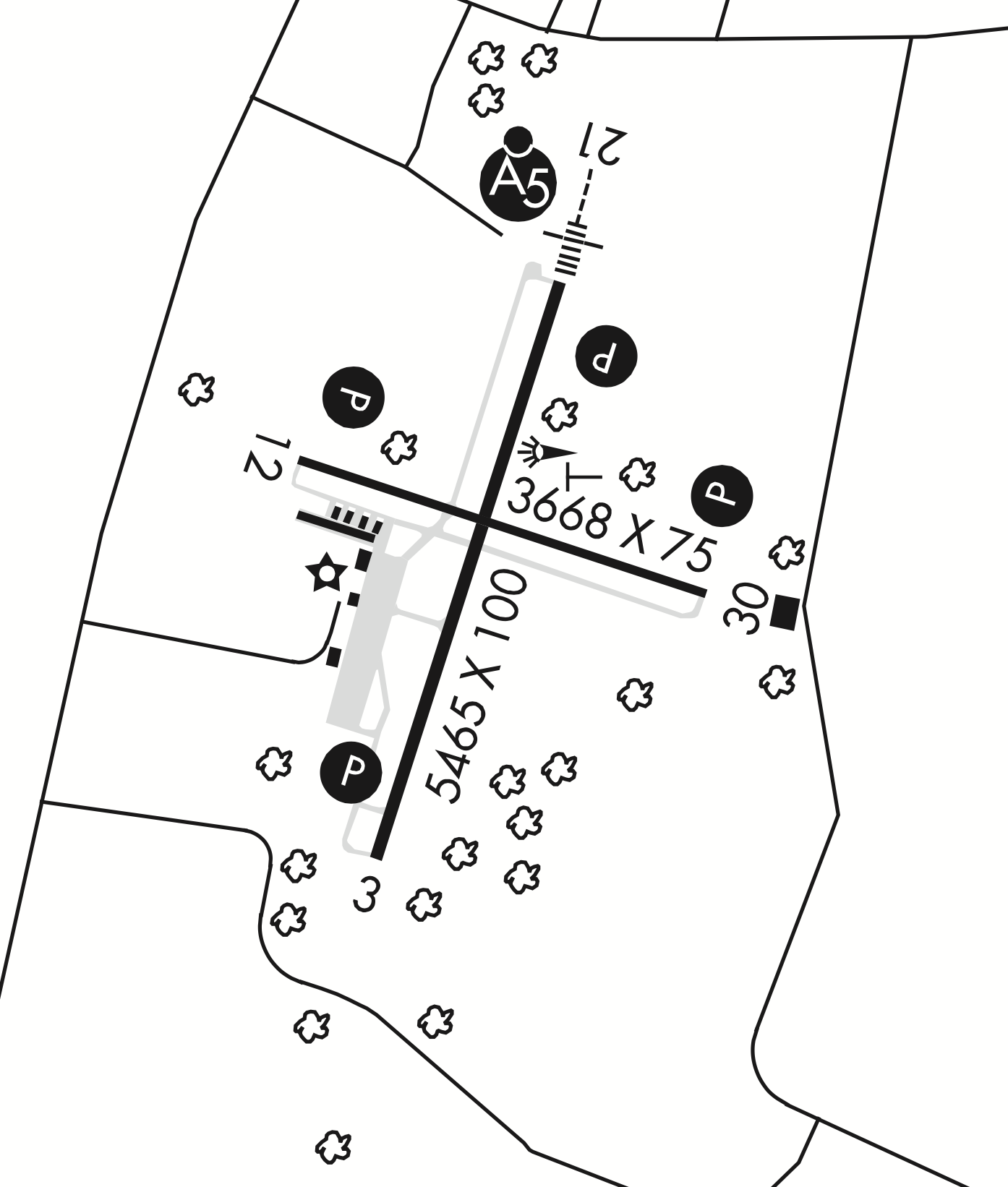
Airport sketch of Altoona–Blair County Airport, United States

In the United States, Aeronautical Information Services provide airport sketches of the airport on the lower portion of approach plates. Airport sketches are simplified versions of airport diagrams that include runway information such as dimensions, slopes, touchdown zone elevation, type of runway end lighting systems. Taxiway shapes are also shown, but the taxiways are not named. Jeppesen instrument approach plates do not have airport sketches.
