= Signal lights =

Signal lights may refer to:

- Traffic light, signal lights controlling automotive & pedestrian traffic flow
- Turn signals, signal lights indicating automotive change of direction
- Railway signalling, use of signal lights to control train traffic flow
- Signal lamp, a device for communicating between ships with flashing lights.
