= Colt Acetylene Flash Lantern =

Acetylene signal lamp

The Colt Acetylene Flash Lantern (or Colt Field Signal Lamp) was an acetylene signal lamp produced by the J. B. Colt Company and used by the United States military at the start of the 1900s. A patent for the device was filed in 1902.

A description from maneuvers at Fort Riley detailed the device:

The Colt's acetylene flash lantern was employed for night signals. The flash is produced by means of a key which causes a full flame to burst forth in the lantern for the length of time the key is pressed down; when the pressure is removed the light reduces to a minute jet, not visible to the receiving station. It is carried in three leather cases, one holding the tripod, one the generator, and the third the flash lantern, reading lamp, and remaining parts. It is assembled on an extension tripod, with the flash lantern on top, the generator attached to the legs beneath the lantern, and the reading lamp is placed on one leg near the lantern. The signals can be seen up to thirty miles with an ordinary field glass.
