= Signal lamp =

Visual signaling device for optical communication

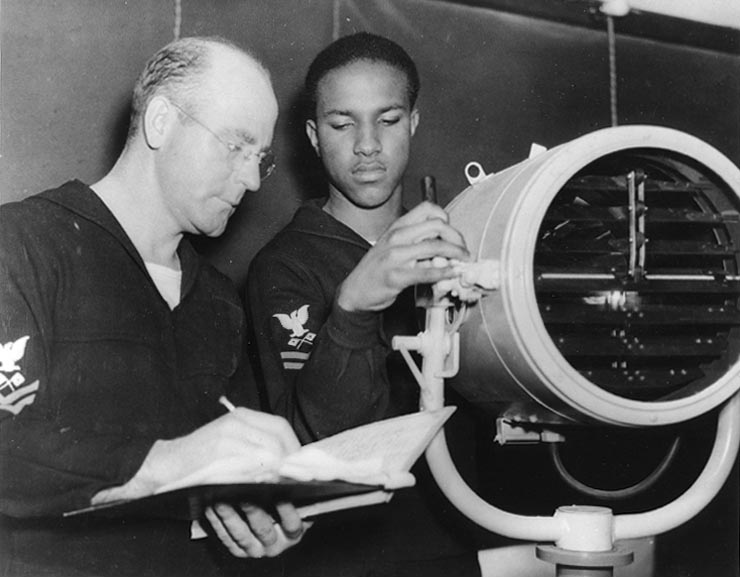
Signal lamp training during World War II

A signal lamp (sometimes called an Aldis lamp or a Morse lamp) is a visual signaling device for optical communication by flashes of a lamp, typically using Morse code. The idea of flashing dots and dashes from a lantern was first put into practice by Captain Philip Howard Colomb, of the Royal Navy, in 1867. Colomb's design used limelight for illumination, and his original code was not the same as Morse code. During World War I, German signalers used optical Morse transmitters called Blinkgerät, with a range of up to 8 km (5 miles) at night, using red filters for undetected communications.

Modern signal lamps produce a focused pulse of light, either by opening and closing shutters mounted in front of the lamp, or by tilting a concave mirror. They continue to be used to the present day on naval vessels and for aviation light signals in air traffic control towers, as a backup device in case of a complete failure of an aircraft's radio.

== History ==
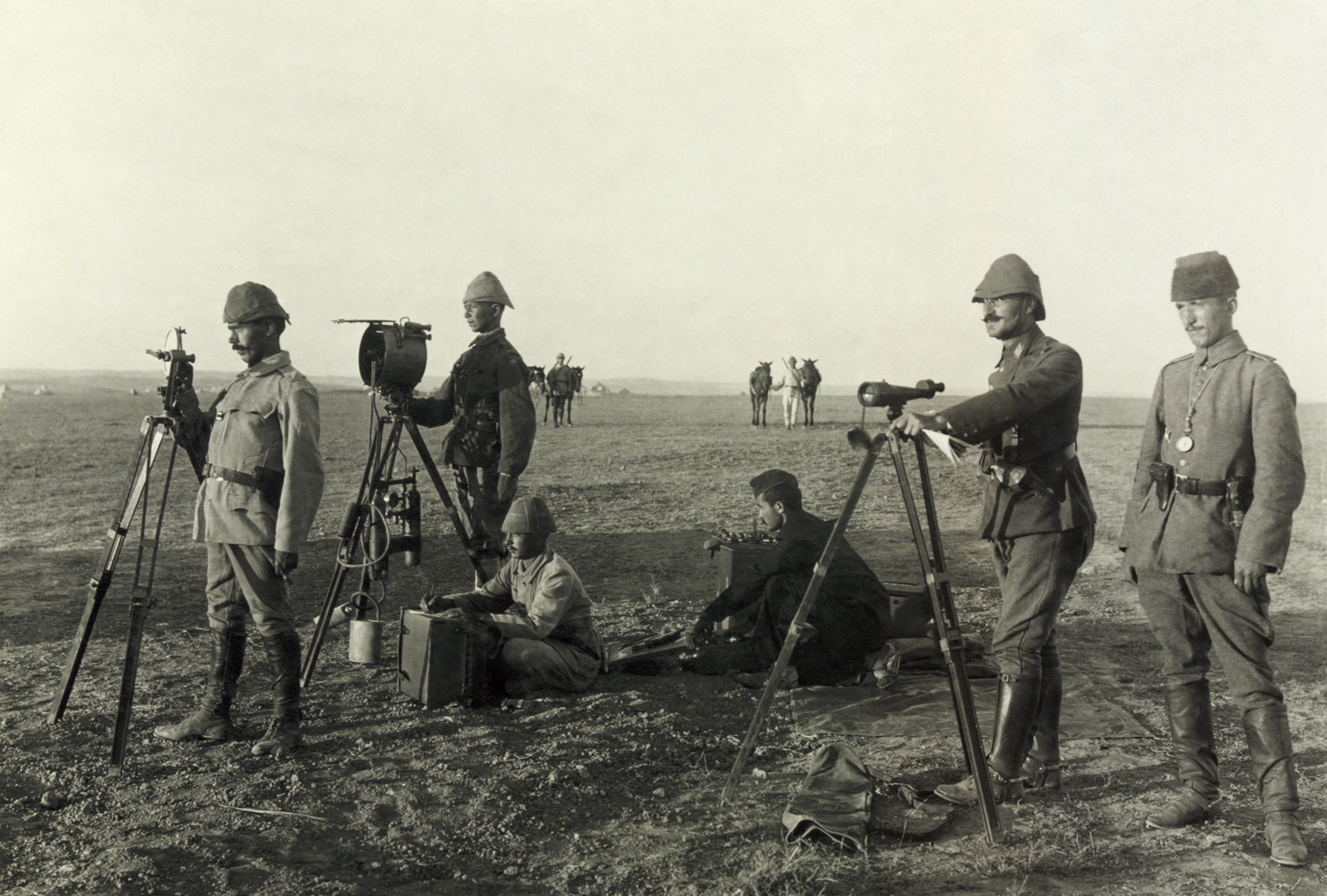
An Ottoman heliograph crew using a Blinkgerät (left)

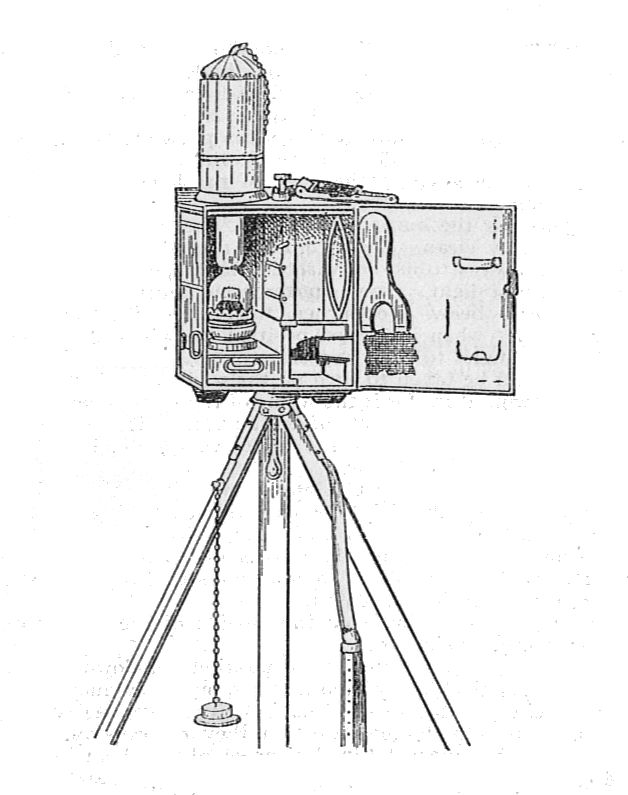
Begbie signalling oil lamp, 1918

Signal lamps were pioneered by the Royal Navy in the late 19th century. They were the second generation of signalling in the Royal Navy, after the flag signals most famously used to spread Nelson's rallying-cry, "England expects that every man will do his duty", before the Battle of Trafalgar.

The idea of flashing dots and dashes from a lantern was first put into practice by Captain, later Vice Admiral, Philip Howard Colomb, of the Royal Navy, in 1867. Colomb's design used limelight for illumination. His original code was not identical to Morse code, but the latter was subsequently adopted.

Another signalling lamp was the Begbie lamp, a kerosene lamp with a lens to focus the light over a long distance.

During the trench warfare of World War I when wire communications were often cut, German signals used three types of optical Morse transmitters, called Blinkgerät, the intermediate type for distances of up to 4 km (2.5 mi) in daylight and of up to 8 km (5 mi) at night, using red filters for undetected communications.

The Light, Signal, Gun Type, Navy, US or Blinker Tube was a signaling device used by landing parties to contact ships without being seen by the enemy.

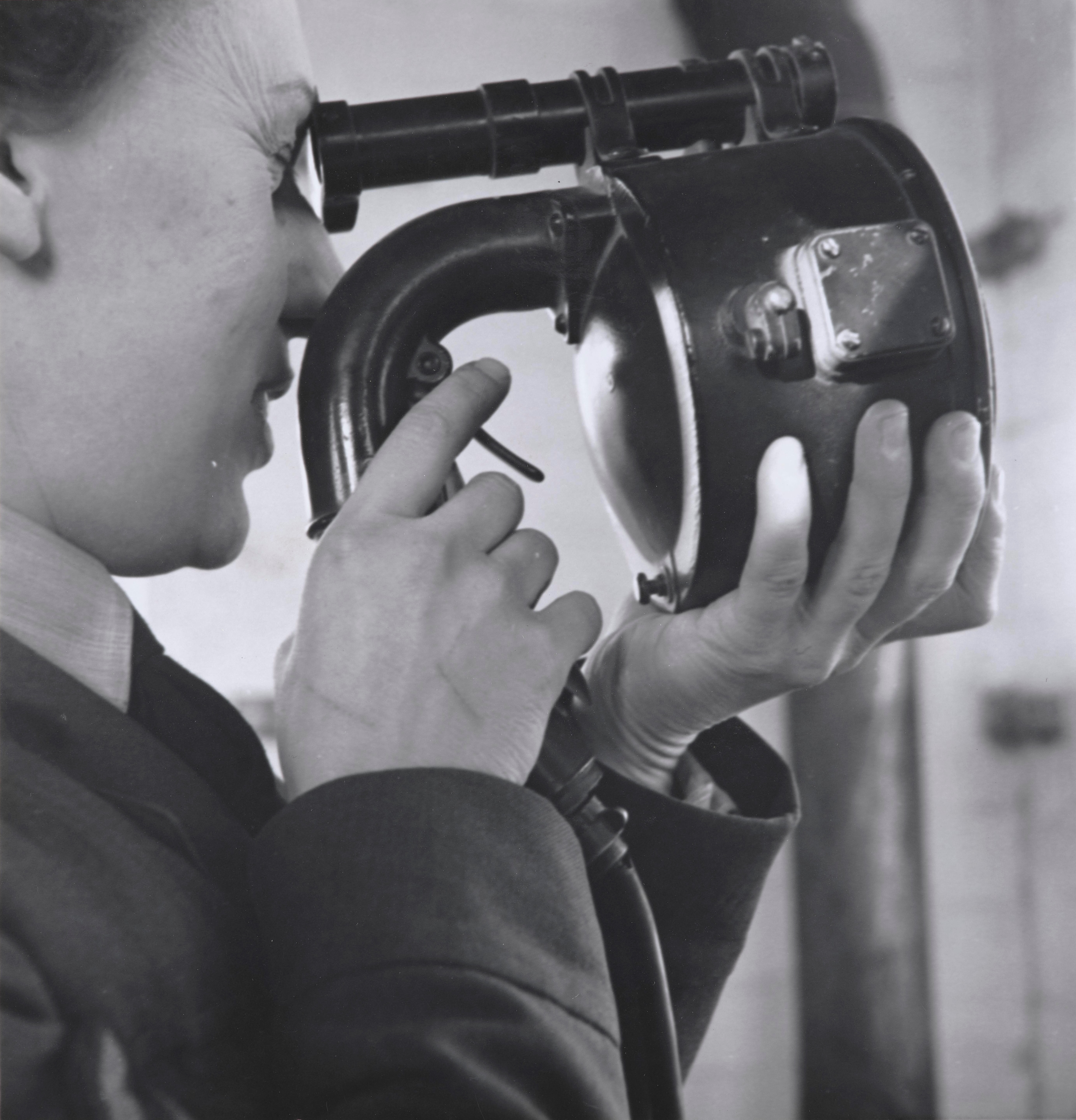
An air traffic controller using a handheld Aldis lamp to signal a plane to land.

In 1944, British inventor Arthur Cyril Webb Aldis patented a small hand-held design, which featured an improved shutter.

As of 2017, the United States Navy was experimenting with automated signaling using signal lamps.

== Design ==
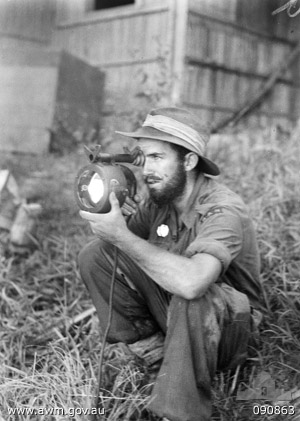
An Australian Beach Commando signalling from a beach during WW II.

Modern signal lamps can produce a focused pulse of light. In large versions, this pulse is achieved by opening and closing shutters mounted in front of the lamp, either via a manually operated pressure switch, or, in later versions, automatically. With hand-held lamps, a concave mirror is tilted by a trigger to focus the light into pulses. The lamps were usually equipped with some form of optical sight, and were most commonly used on naval vessels and in air traffic control towers, using colour signals for stop or clearance. In manual signalling, a signalman would aim the light at the recipient ship and turn a lever, opening and closing the shutter over the lamp, to emit flashes of light to spell out text messages in Morse code. On the recipient ship, a signalman would observe the blinking light, often with binoculars, and translate the code into text.

Some signal lamps are mounted on the mastheads of ships while some small hand-held versions are also used. Other more powerful versions are mounted on pedestals. These larger ones use a carbon arc lamp as their light source, with a diameter of 20 inches (510 mm). These can be used to signal to the horizon, even in conditions of bright sunlight.

== Modern use ==
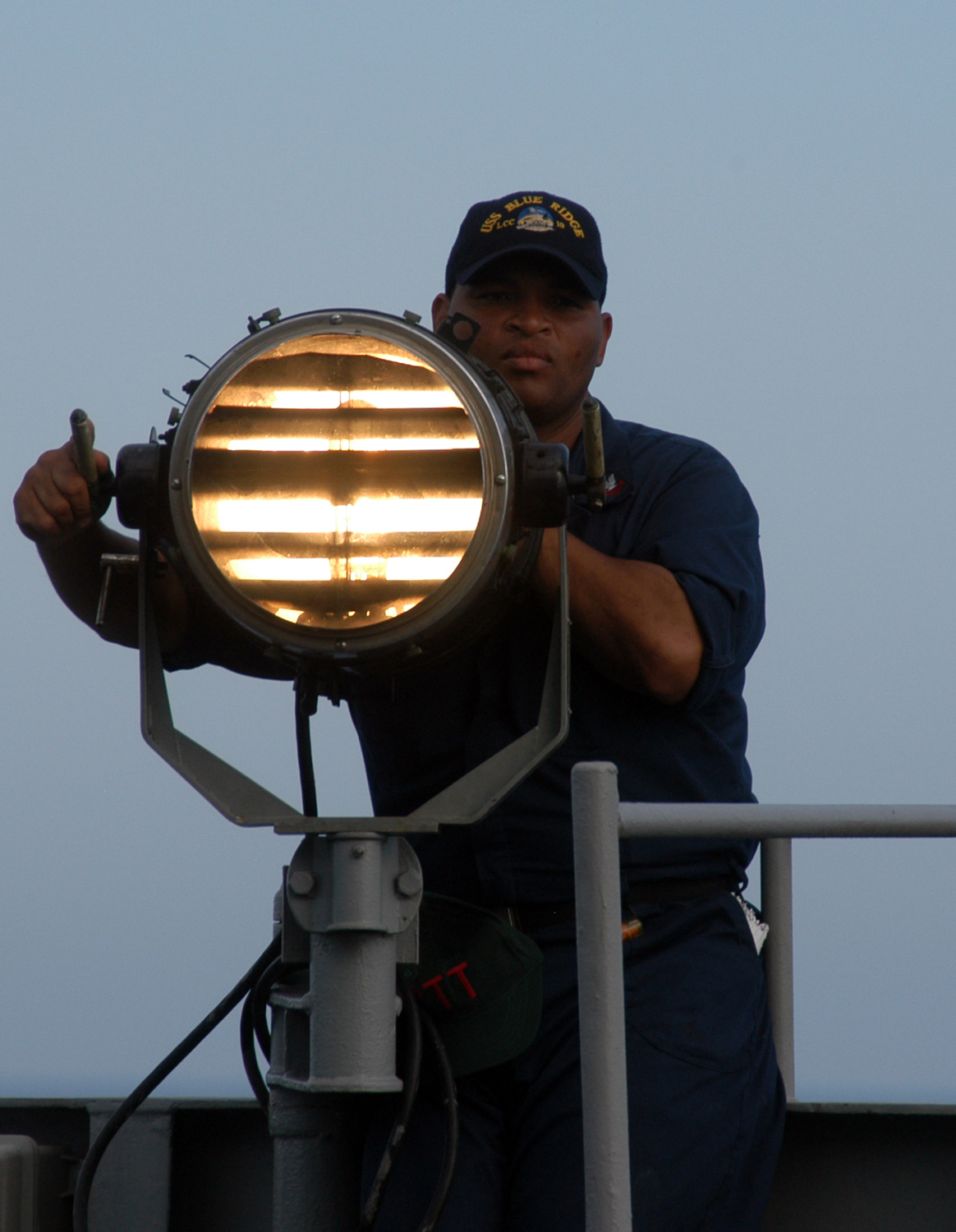
A United States Navy sailor sending Morse code using a signal lamp

Signal lamps continue to be used to the present day on naval vessels. They provide handy, relatively secure communications, which are especially useful during periods of radio silence, such as for convoys operating during the Battle of the Atlantic.

The Commonwealth navies and NATO forces use signal lamps when radio communications need to be silent or electronic "spoofing" is likely. Also, given the prevalence of night vision equipment in today's armed forces, signaling at night is usually done with lights that operate in the infrared (IR) portion of the electromagnetic spectrum, making them less likely to be detected. All modern forces have followed suit due to technological advances in digital communications.

Signal lamps are still used today for aviation light signals in air traffic control towers as a backup device in case of a complete failure of an aircraft's radio. Light signals can be green, red, or white, and steady or flashing. Messages are limited to a handful of basic instructions, e.g., "land", "stop", etc.; they are not intended to be used for transmitting messages in Morse code. Aircraft can acknowledge signals by rocking their wings or flashing their landing lights.

== See also ==
- Colt Acetylene Flash Lantern
- Flag semaphore
- Heliograph
- VS-17
