= J. B. Colt Company =

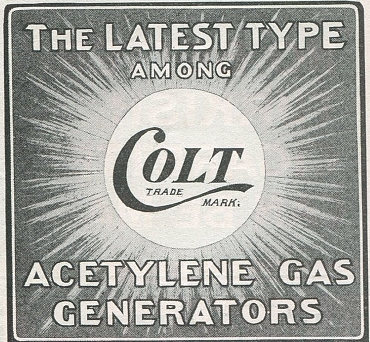

The J. B. Colt Company was a producer of lamps and acetylene products based in New York City, headed by James Bennett Colt and in operation from 1891 to 1911. Among its products was the Colt Acetylene Flash Lantern used by the American military.

The company was acquired by its competitor, the Acetylene Apparatus Company of Chicago, in 1911.

A former Colt employee (1894–1896), Edwin J. Hadley, went on to invent cinema equipment, including a 1904 device to reduce image flicker.
