= Formation light =

Aircraft lighting for formation flying

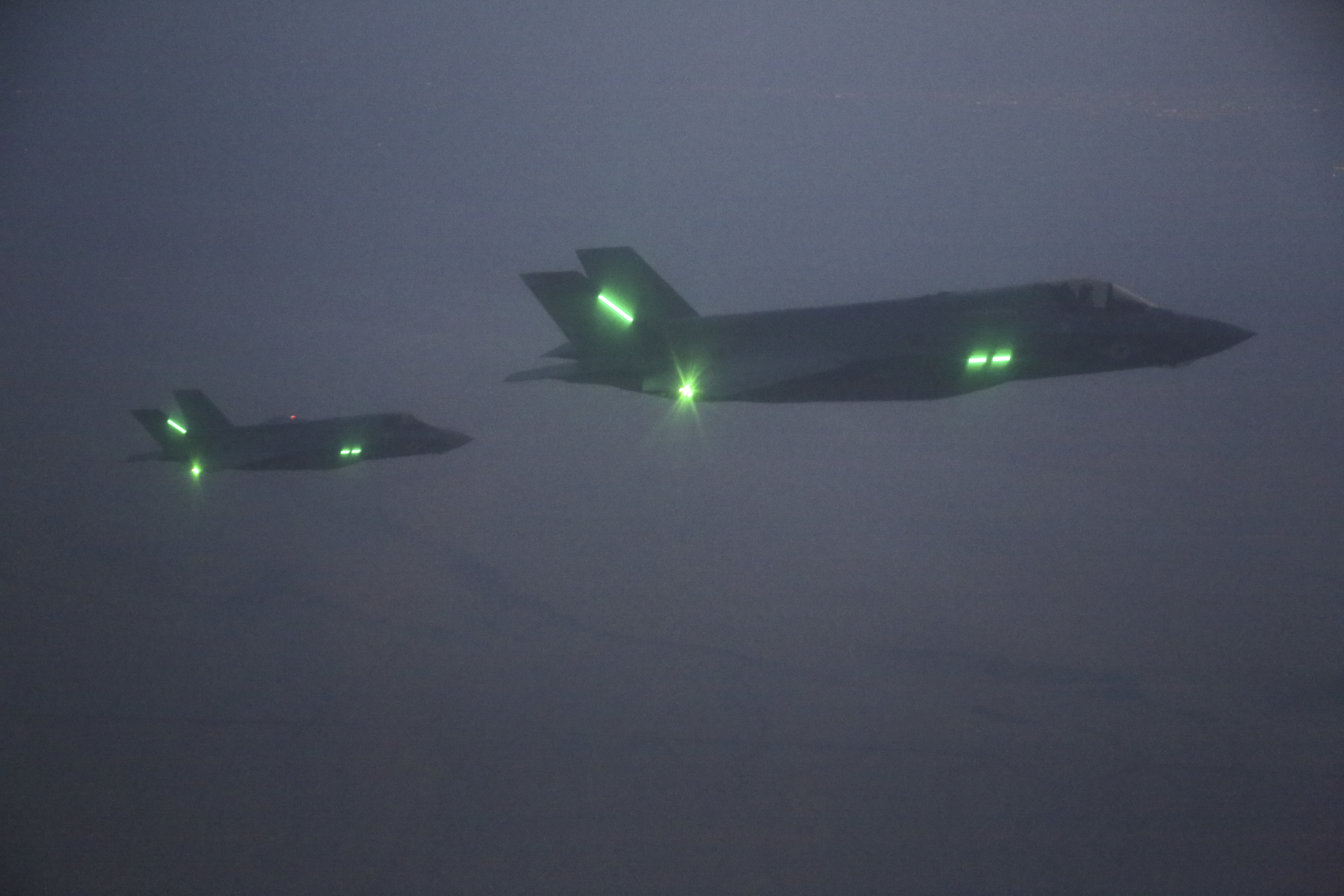
Lockheed Martin F-35 Lightning IIs with green formation lights turned on

A formation light, also known as a slime light, is a type of thin film electroluminescent light that assists aircraft flying in formation in low visibility environments.

== History ==
Different designs of formation lights were studied in March 1955 by Charles A. Baker at the Wright Air Development Center.

While navigation lights had previously been implemented on aircraft such as the P-40 Warhawk, Baker sought to improve on aircraft visibility after a series of collisions. The navigation lights in use at the time were found to be inadequate. The study tested point lights, floodlights, and linear lights, the last of which were "enthusiastically supported by experienced pilots".

== See also ==
- Navigation light
- Landing lights
