= NORDO =

Aircraft flying without a radio

In North American aviation, a NORDO (/ˈnɔːrdoʊ/) aircraft is an aircraft flying without a radio. While sometimes used to denote small general aviation aircraft that are not equipped with a radio, the term is more commonly applied to aircraft that have experienced a radio failure while flying.

The term originates from the 5-character uppercase abbreviated notation "NORDO" displayed on controllers' radar scopes when an aircraft transmits the "radio failure" code on its transponder. An alternate explanation is that "NO RDO" was the standard note made on maintenance and equipment sheets used in military aviation, starting in the 1930s, as a code to identify planes which needed radio repairs or were not equipped with radios. The term has made its way into standard aviation jargon, used as an adjective or a noun to describe an aircraft without a radio, even among pilots and others who are not air traffic controllers.

In-flight radio failure may constitute an emergency, as determined by the pilot. Aircraft equipped with a transponder should indicate a NORDO situation by setting the appropriate transponder code: 7600 ("seven-six: radio fix"). NORDO aircraft declaring an emergency are given priority over other aircraft (providing a more serious emergency does not occur on another aircraft).

If the radio failure occurs in visual flight rules (VFR) conditions in an area where radio communication is required, the pilot is expected to continue under VFR and land when feasible. If flying under instrument flight rules (IFR) conditions, and VFR conditions exist or are encountered after the failure, the flight should be continued in VFR conditions and the pilot shall land as soon as practicable. If VFR conditions do not exist, the pilot will then continue the route last assigned by ATC. See FAR 91.185.

Air traffic control may re-establish communications with NORDO aircraft by using emergency frequencies, voice features of NAVAIDs, or aviation light signals. In the event of one-way communications (i.e. aircraft can receive only), the controller may request the aircraft make identifying turns, flash their navigational lights, transmit codes or IDENT signals on the transponder, rock their wings, etc., to acknowledge clearances or instructions.
