= Navigation light =

Lights on a vehicle indicating position, heading, and status

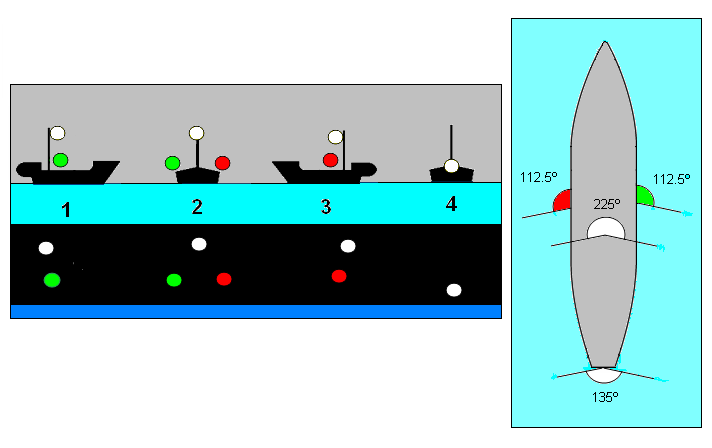
Basic lighting configuration. 2, a vessel facing directly towards observer; 4, vessel facing away from the observer

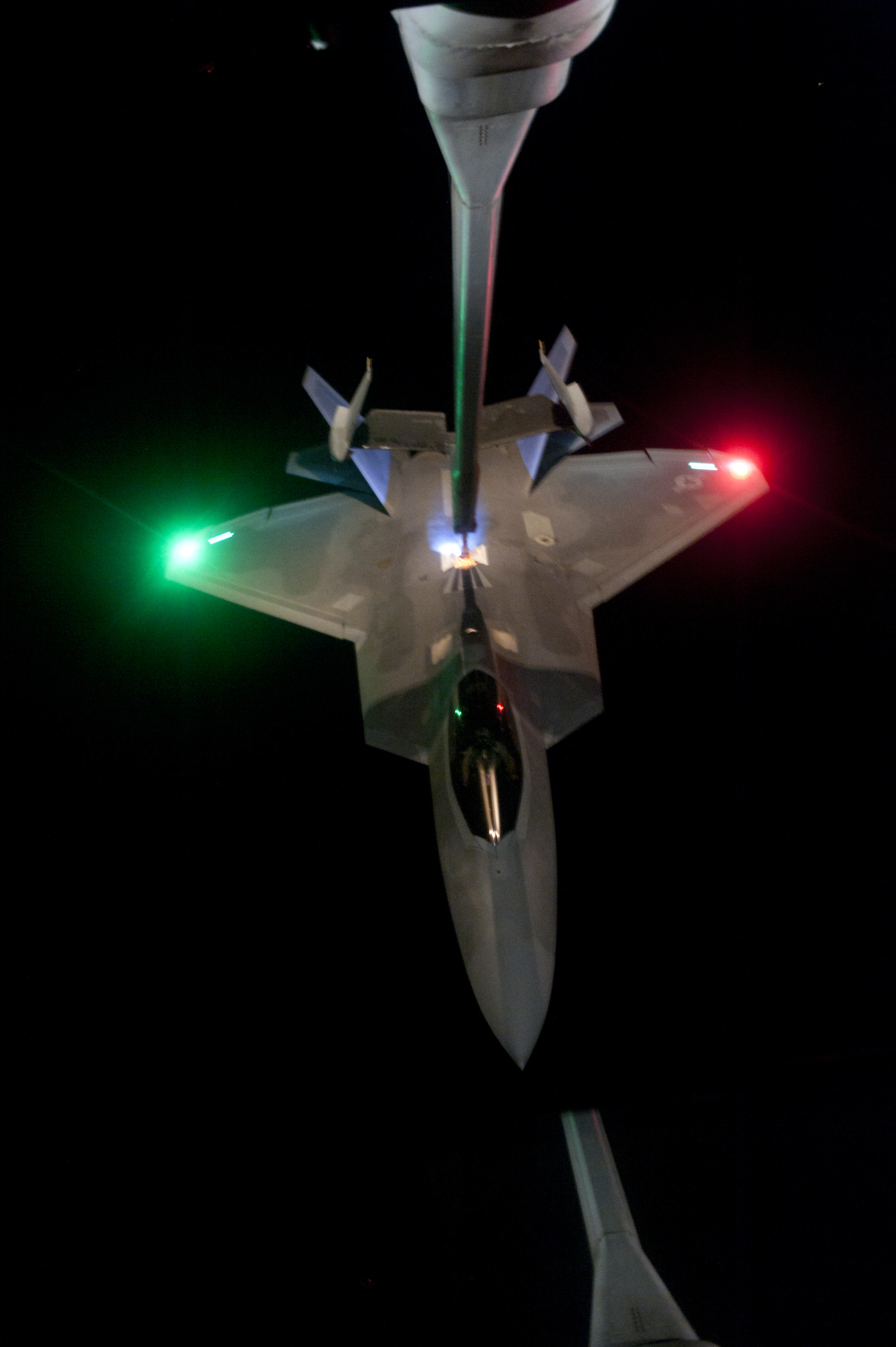
Red and green navigation lights on an F-22 Raptor

A navigation light, also known as a running or position light, is a source of illumination on a watercraft, aircraft or spacecraft, meant to give information on the craft's position, heading, or status. Some navigation lights are colour-coded red and green to aid traffic control by identifying the craft's orientation. Their placement is mandated by international conventions or civil authorities such as the International Maritime Organization (IMO).

A common misconception is that marine or aircraft navigation lights indicate which of two approaching vessels has the "right of way" as in ground traffic; this is not precisely true, as aircraft and watercraft cannot stop to allow each other to pass, as ground vehicles do. However, the red and green colours do indicate which vessel has the duty to "give way" (change course or speed) or to "stand on" (hold course and speed). In a manner consistent with the ground traffic convention, the rightmost of the two vehicles is usually given stand-on status and the leftmost must give way. Therefore a red light is used on the port (left) side to indicate "you must give way"; and a green light on the starboard (right) side indicates "I will give way; you must stand on". When two power-driven vessels approach head-on, both are required to give way.

== Marine navigation ==
In 1838 the United States passed an act requiring steamboats running between sunset and sunrise to carry one or more signal lights; colour, visibility and location were not specified.

In 1846 the United Kingdom passed the Steam Navigation Act 1846 (9 & 10 Vict. c. 100) enabling the Lord High Admiral to publish regulations requiring all sea-going steam vessels to carry lights. The Admiralty exercised these powers in 1848 and required steam vessels to display red and green sidelights as well as a white masthead light whilst under way and a single white light when at anchor.

In 1849 the U.S. Congress extended the light requirements to sailing vessels.

In 1889 the United States convened the first International Maritime Conference to consider regulations for preventing collisions. The resulting Washington Conference Rules were adopted by the U.S. in 1890 and became effective internationally in 1897. Within these rules was the requirement for steamships to carry a second mast head light.

The international 1948 Safety of Life at Sea Conference recommended a mandatory second masthead light solely for power-driven vessels over 150 feet (46 m) in length and a fixed sternlight for almost all vessels. The regulations have changed little since then.

The International Regulations for Preventing Collisions at Sea (COLREGs) established in 1972 stipulates the requirements for navigation lights required on a vessel.

=== Basic lighting ===
Watercraft navigation lights must permit other vessels to determine the type and relative angle of a vessel, and thus decide if there is a danger of collision. In general, sailing vessels are required to carry a green light that shines from dead ahead to 2 points (22 1/2°) abaft (Note: abaft: to the rear/closer to stern/'aft') the beam on the starboard side (the right side from the perspective of someone on board facing forward), a red light from dead ahead to two points abaft the beam on the port side (left side) and a white light that shines from astern to two points abaft the beam on both sides. Power driven vessels in addition to these lights, must carry either one or two (depending on length) white masthead lights that shine from ahead to two points abaft the beam on both sides. If two masthead lights are carried then the aft one must be higher than the forward one.

Small power-driven vessels (under 12 metres (39 ft)) may carry a single all-round white light in place of the two or three white lights carried by larger vessels, they must also carry red and green navigation lights. Vessels under 7 metres (23 ft) with a maximum speed of less than 7 knots (13 km/h; 8.1 mph) are not required to carry navigation lights, but must be capable of showing a white light. Hovercraft at all times and some boats operating in crowded areas may also carry a yellow flashing beacon for added visibility during day or night.

=== Lights of special significance ===
In addition to red, white and green running lights, a combination of red, white and green mast lights placed on a mast higher than all the running lights, and viewable from all directions, may be used to indicate the type of craft or the service it is performing. See "User Guide" in external links.

- Ships at anchor display one or two white anchor lights (depending on the vessel's length) that can be seen from all directions. If two lights are shown then the forward light is higher than the aft one.
- Boats classed as "small" are not compelled to carry navigation lights and may make use of a hand-held flashlight.

== Aviation navigation ==
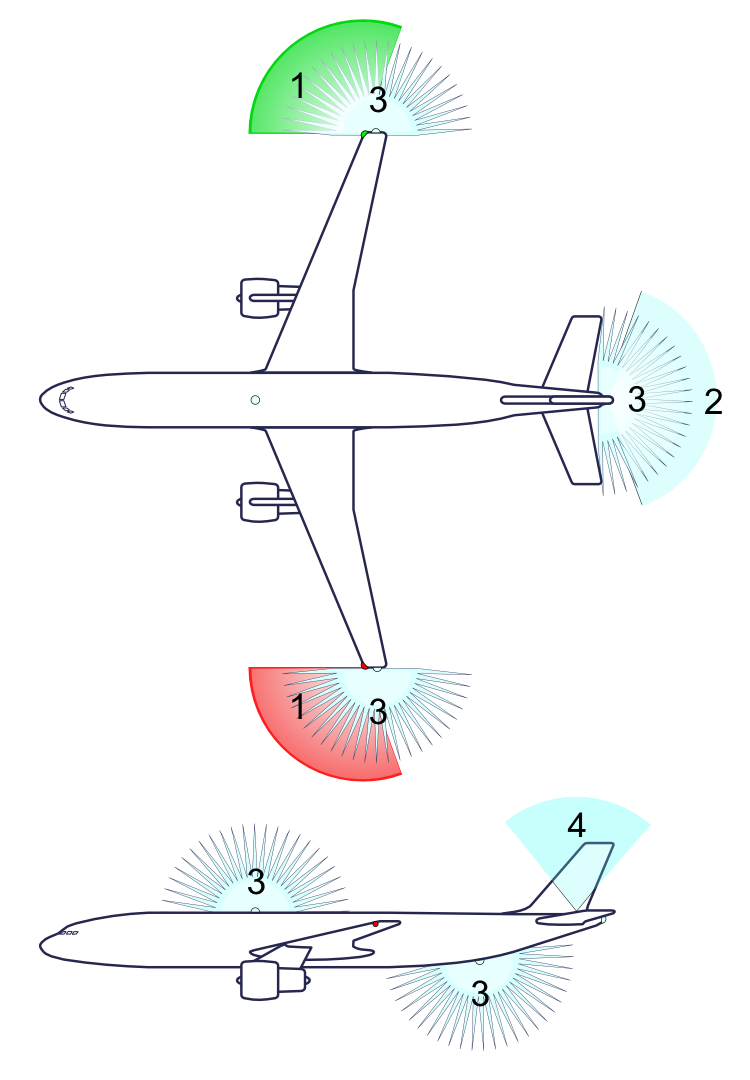
1. Navigation lights; 2. Aft light; 3. Anti-collision strobe lights; 4. Logo light

Aircraft are fitted with external navigational lights similar in purpose to those required on watercraft. These are used to signal actions such as entering an active runway or starting up an engine. Historically, incandescent bulbs have been used to provide light; however, recently light-emitting diodes have been used.

Aircraft navigation lights follow the convention of marine vessels established a half-century earlier, with a red navigation light located on the left wingtip leading edge and a green light on the right wingtip leading edge. A white navigation light is as far aft as possible on the tail or each wing tip. High-intensity strobe lights are located on the aircraft to aid in collision avoidance. Anti-collision lights are flashing lights on the top and bottom of the fuselage, wingtips and tail tip. Their purpose is to alert others when something is happening that ground crew and other aircraft need to be aware of, such as running engines or entering active runways.

In civil aviation, pilots must keep navigation lights on from sunset to sunrise, even after engine shutdown when at the gate. High-intensity white strobe lights are part of the anti-collision light system, as well as the red flashing beacon.

All aircraft built after 11 March 1996 must have an anti-collision light system (strobe lights or rotating beacon) turned on for all flight activities in poor visibility. The anti-collision system is recommended in good visibility, where only strobes and beacon are required can use white (clear) lights to increase conspicuity during the daytime. For example, just before pushback, the pilot must keep the beacon lights on to notify ground crews that the engines are about to start. These beacon lights stay on for the duration of the flight. While taxiing, the taxi lights are on. When coming onto the runway, the taxi lights go off and the landing lights and strobes go on. When passing 10,000 feet, the landing lights are no longer required, and the pilot can elect to turn them off. The same cycle in reverse order applies when landing. Landing lights are bright white, forward and downward facing lights on the front of an aircraft. Their purpose is to allow the pilot to see the landing area, and to allow ground crew to see the approaching aircraft.

Civilian commercial airliners also have other non-navigational lights. These include logo lights, which illuminate the company logo on the tail fin. These lights are optional to turn on, though most pilots switch them on at night to increase visibility from other aircraft. Modern airliners also have a wing light. These are positioned on the outer side just in front of the engine cowlings on the fuselage. These are not required to be on, but in some cases pilots turn these lights on for engine checks and also while passengers board the aircraft for better visibility of the ground near the aircraft. While seldom seen, the International Code of Signals allows for the exclusive use of flashing blue lights (60 to 100 flashes/minute), visible from as many directions as possible, by medical aircraft to signal their identity.

== Spacecraft navigation ==
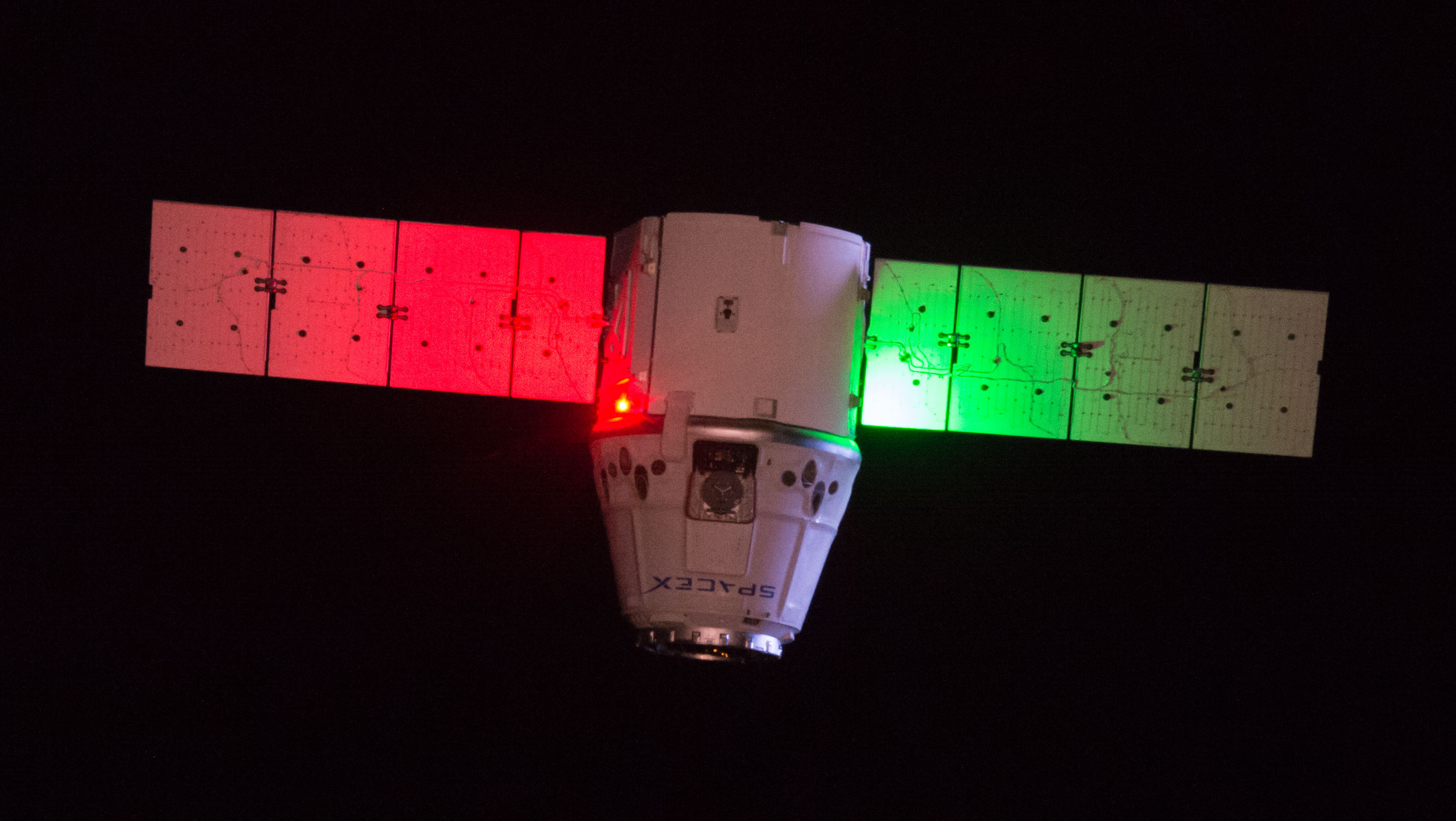
Red and green bottom navigation lights on SpaceX Dragon

In 2011, ORBITEC developed the first light-emitting diode (LED) system for use as running lights on spacecraft. Currently, Cygnus spacecraft, which are uncrewed transport vessels designed for cargo transport to the International Space Station, utilize a navigational lighting system consisting of five flashing high power LED lights. The Cygnus displays a flashing red light on the port side of the vessel, a flashing green on the starboard side of the vessel, two flashing white lights on the top and one flashing yellow on the bottom side of the fuselage.

The SpaceX Dragon and Dragon 2 spacecraft also feature a flashing strobe along with red and green lights.

== Modern technology ==
Recent developments in navigation lighting have focused on energy efficiency, visibility, and integration with other avionics systems. Light-emitting diode (LED) technology has largely replaced incandescent bulbs on modern aircraft, providing longer lifespan and reduced maintenance. Some advanced aircraft models incorporate automatic brightness adjustment based on ambient light sensors to enhance visibility without dazzling other pilots. Navigation lights are also integrated into aircraft health monitoring systems, enabling crews and maintenance personnel to detect failures through cockpit alerts. These innovations align with broader aviation safety modernization efforts led by the Federal Aviation Administration and the International Civil Aviation Organization.

== See also ==
- Formation light
- Landing lights
