= Anti-collision light =

Lights on aircraft to improve visibility

Anti-collision lights, also called beacon lights or strobe lights, are a set of lights required on every aircraft to improve visibility to others, as well as collision avoidance measures by warning other pilots. Historically they have used incandescent light bulbs, but later used xenon flash lamps and more recently LED lamps.

== Types of anti-collision light ==
=== Beacon ===
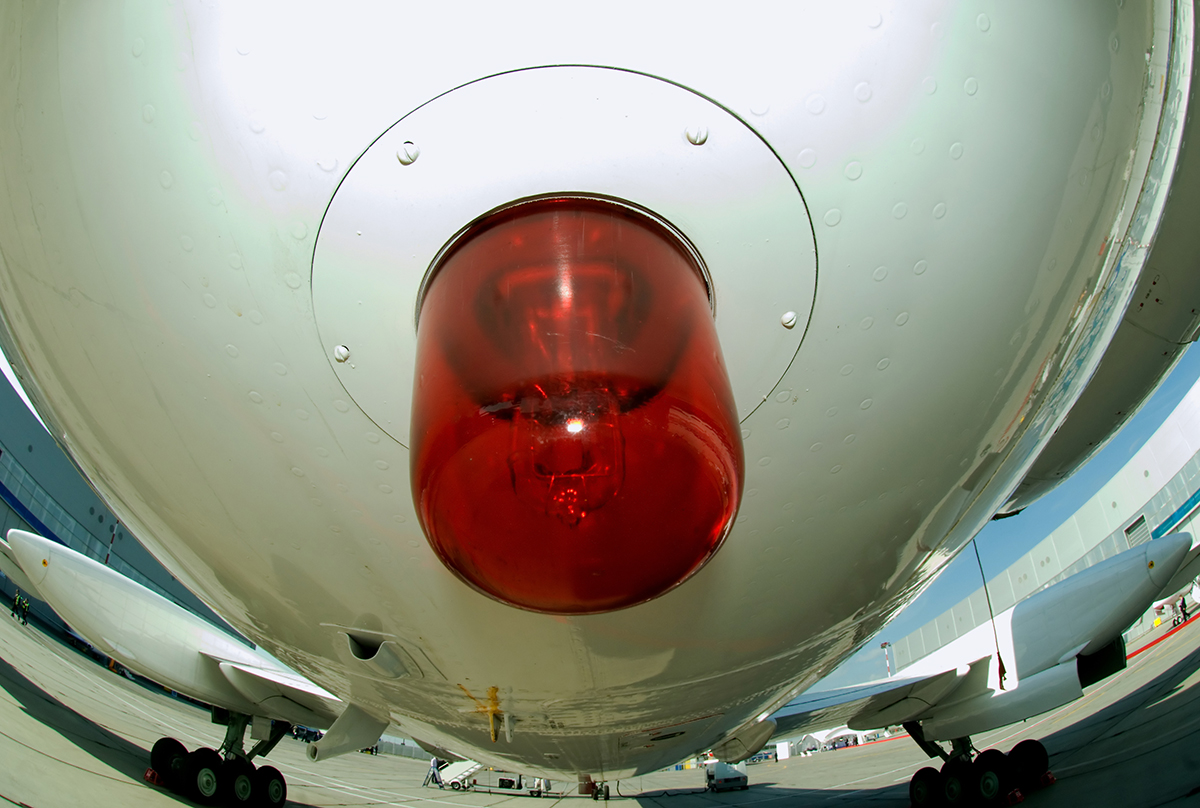
Detailed view of a Beacon light on a Tu-154

Beacon lights are flashing red lights fitted on the top and bottom fuselage of an aircraft usually on larger passenger aircraft. Their purpose is to alert ground crew and other aircraft that an engine is starting up, running or shutting down, or that the aircraft is about to start moving. Some spin to produce the flashing effect, increasing the chance they will be noticed. Beacon lights are bright enough to be seen from the ground, and can be used to identify aircraft from the ground in dark or overcast conditions where the plane itself is not completely visible.

=== Strobe ===
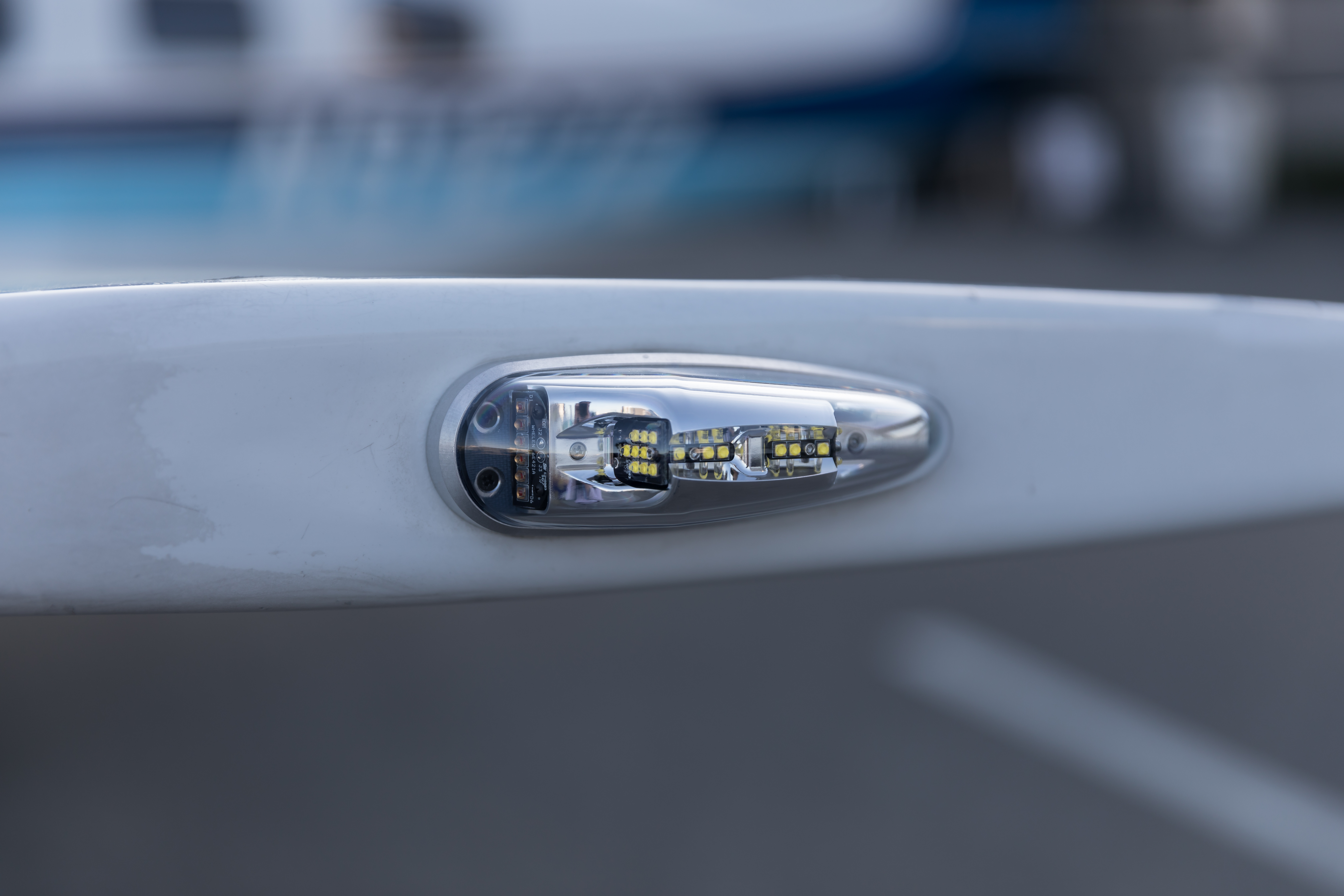
Detailed view of a left strobe on a Piper Malibu

Strobe lights are flashing white lights on the furthest left, right and, on larger aircraft and some smaller ones, back points of an aircraft. They are the brightest lights on the aircraft, and are used to signal that an aircraft is entering or approaching an active runway, or for visibility in dark, clear sky. They are sometimes turned off in cloud or fog, as they can further obscure the pilot's view outside the aircraft by reflecting off water droplets.

== See also ==
- Index of aviation articles
- Yehudi lights
