= Landing lights =

Aircraft lights

Landing lights are lights, mounted on aircraft, that illuminate the terrain and runway ahead during takeoff and landing, as well as being used as a collision avoidance measure against other aircraft and bird strikes.

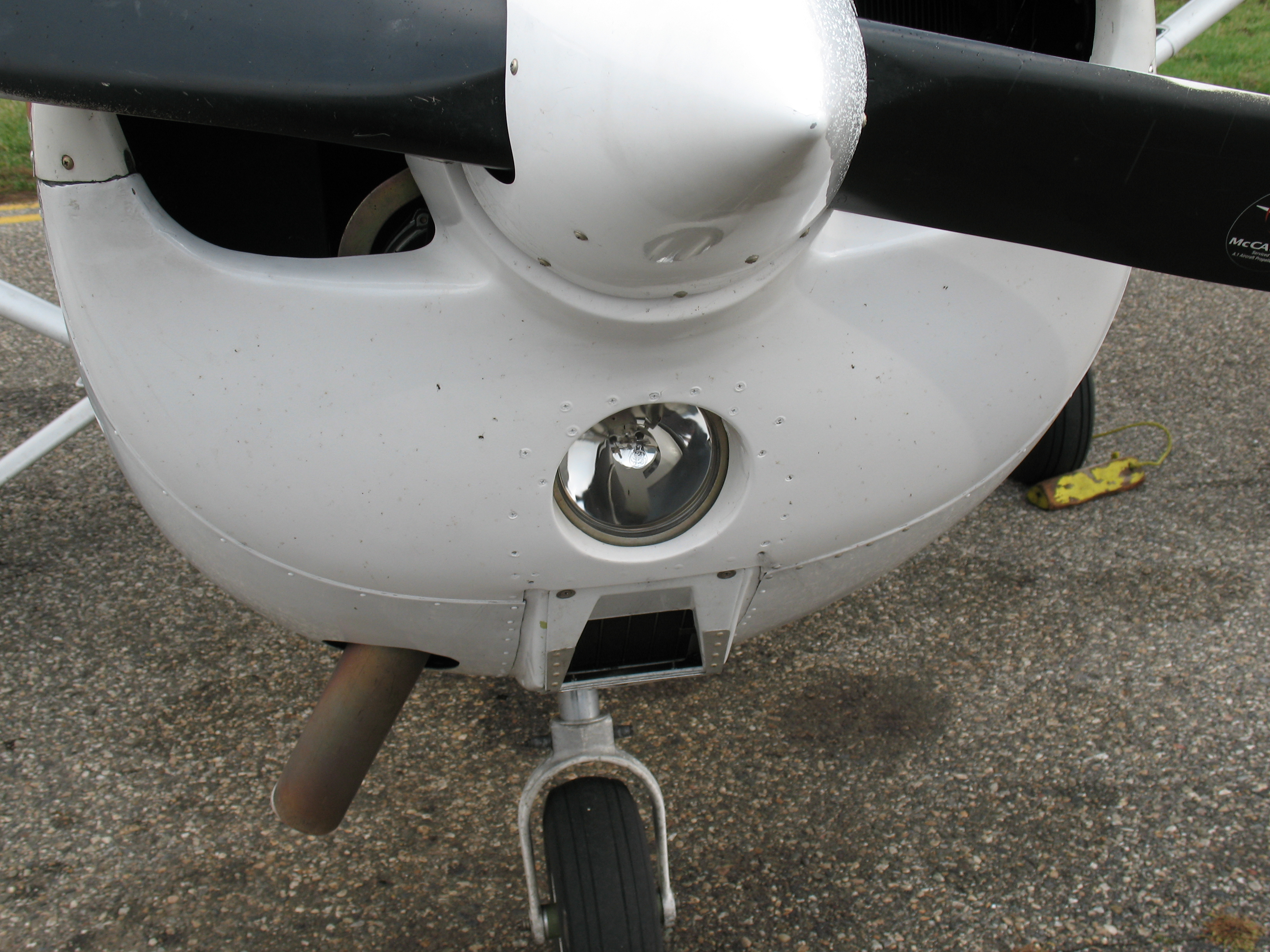
Landing light on a Cessna 172N

== Overview ==
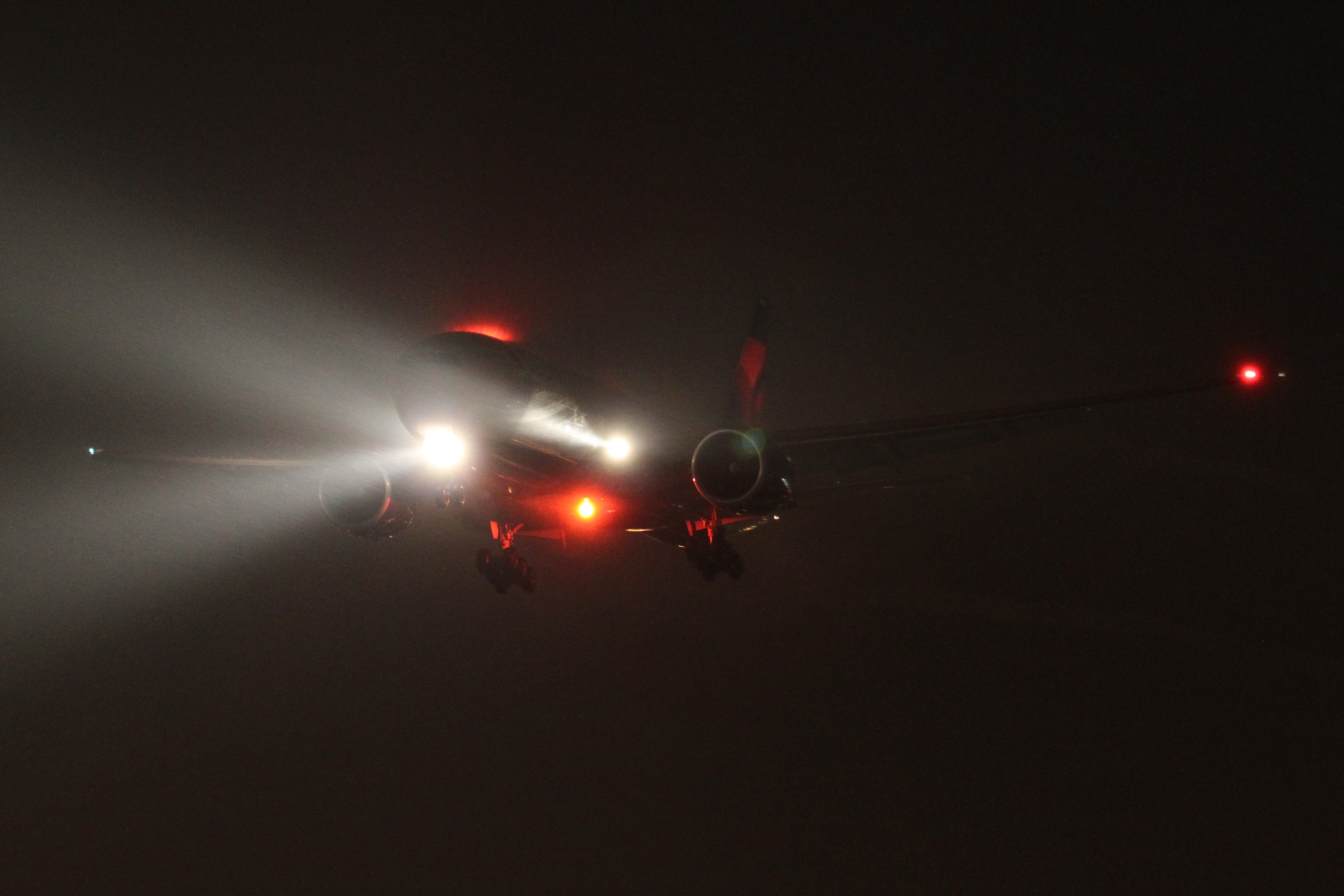
Boeing 777 with landing lights, navigation lights, and anti-collision beacon lights turned on

Aircraft with one landing light activated flying through clouds

Almost all modern aircraft are equipped with landing lights if approved for nighttime operations. Landing lights are usually of very high intensity, because of the considerable distance that may separate an aircraft from terrain or obstacles. The landing lights of large aircraft can easily be seen by other aircraft over 100 miles away.

Key considerations of landing light design include intensity, reliability, weight, and power consumption. Ideal landing lights are extremely intense, require little electrical power, are lightweight, and have long and predictable service lives. Past and present technologies include ordinary incandescent lamps, halogen lamps, various forms of arc lamps and discharge lamps, and LED lamps.

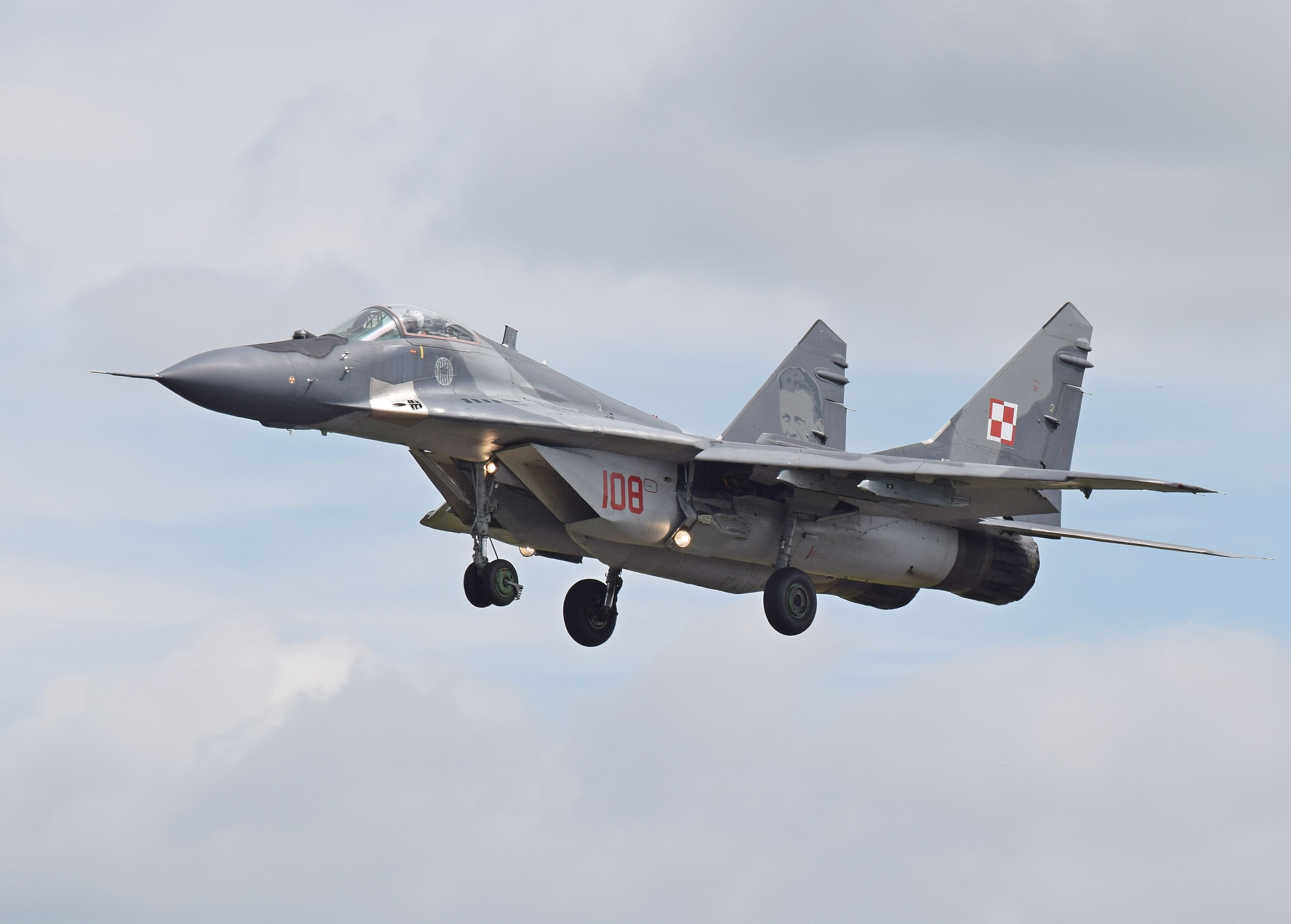
Landing lights on a Mikoyan MiG-29

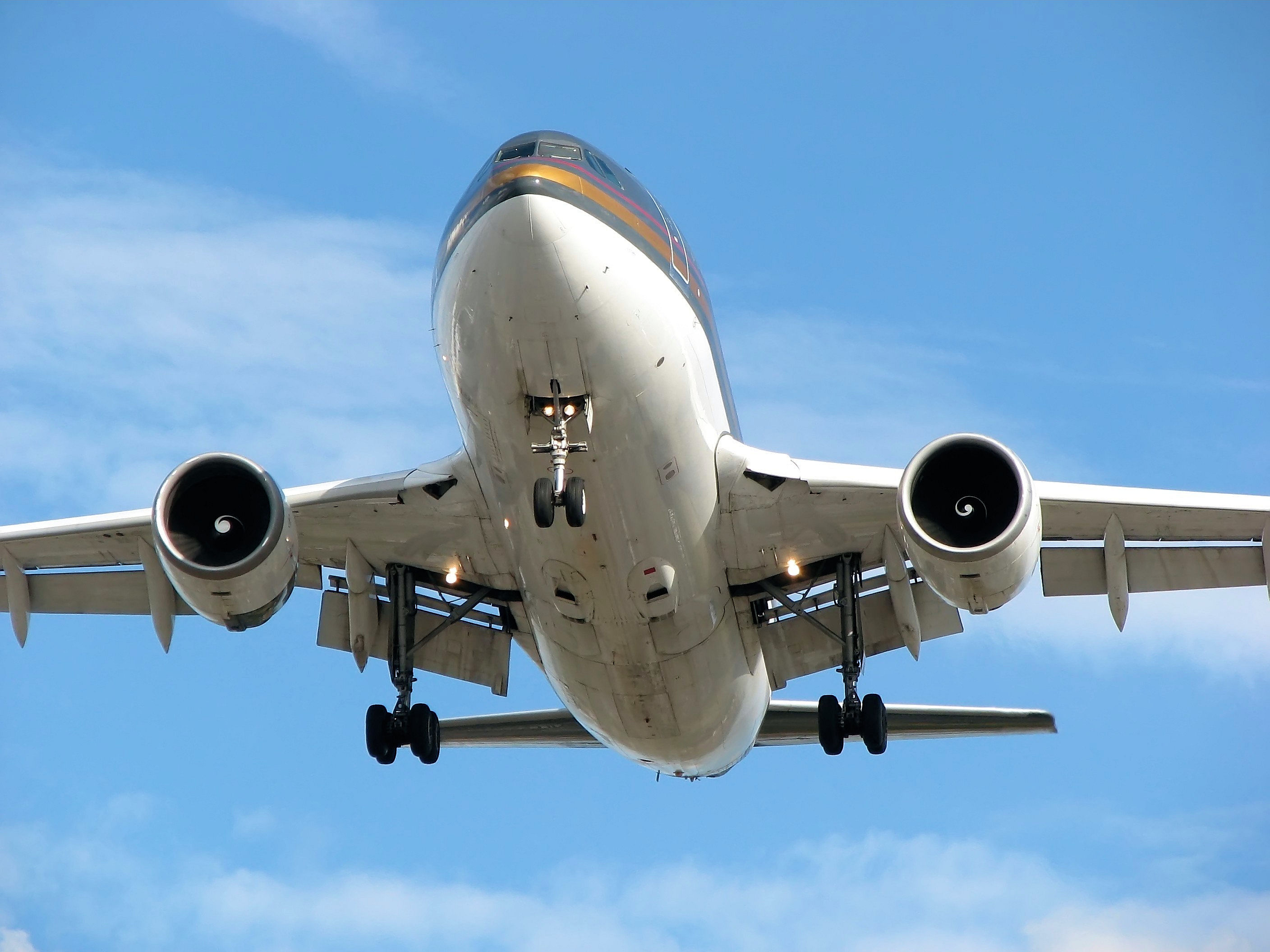
Landing lights on a Royal Jordanian Airbus A310, two on the nose undercarriage leg and two on the wings

Landing lights are typically only useful as visibility aids to the pilots when the aircraft is very low and close to terrain, as during take-off and landing. Landing lights are usually extinguished in cruise flight, especially if atmospheric conditions are likely to make the lights reflect or glare back into the eyes of the pilots. However, the brightness of landing lights makes them useful for increasing the visibility of an aircraft to other pilots, and so pilots are often encouraged to keep their landing lights on while below certain altitudes or in crowded airspace. Some aircraft (especially business jets) have lights that— when not needed to directly illuminate the ground—can operate in a flashing mode to enhance visibility to other aircraft. One convention is for commercial aircraft to turn on their landing lights when changing flight levels. Landing lights are sometimes used in emergencies to communicate with ground personnel or other aircraft, especially if other means of communication are not available (radio failures and the like). Additionally, landing lights have at times been installed as a vehicle high beam in the hot rod scene, although this is not legal.

== Legal considerations ==
In many jurisdictions, landing light fixtures and the lamps they use must be certified for use in a given aircraft by a government authority. The use of the landing light may be required or forbidden by local regulations, depending on a variety of factors such as the local time, weather, or flight operations.

In the United States, for example, landing lights are not required or used for many types of aircraft, but their use is strongly encouraged, both for take-off and landing and during any operations below 10,000 feet (3,000 m) or within ten nautical miles (19 km) of an airport (FAA AIM 4–3–23). According to CFR 14 and FAR Part 91.205, a landing light is required for all aircraft used in commercial operations at night.

Landing lights may not be lit when taxiing or near an airport gate; this can cause flash blindness to ground crew and other pilots.

== See also ==
- Aircraft warning lights
- Aviation navigation lights
- Optical landing system
- Precision approach path indicator
