= Automotive industry in New Zealand =

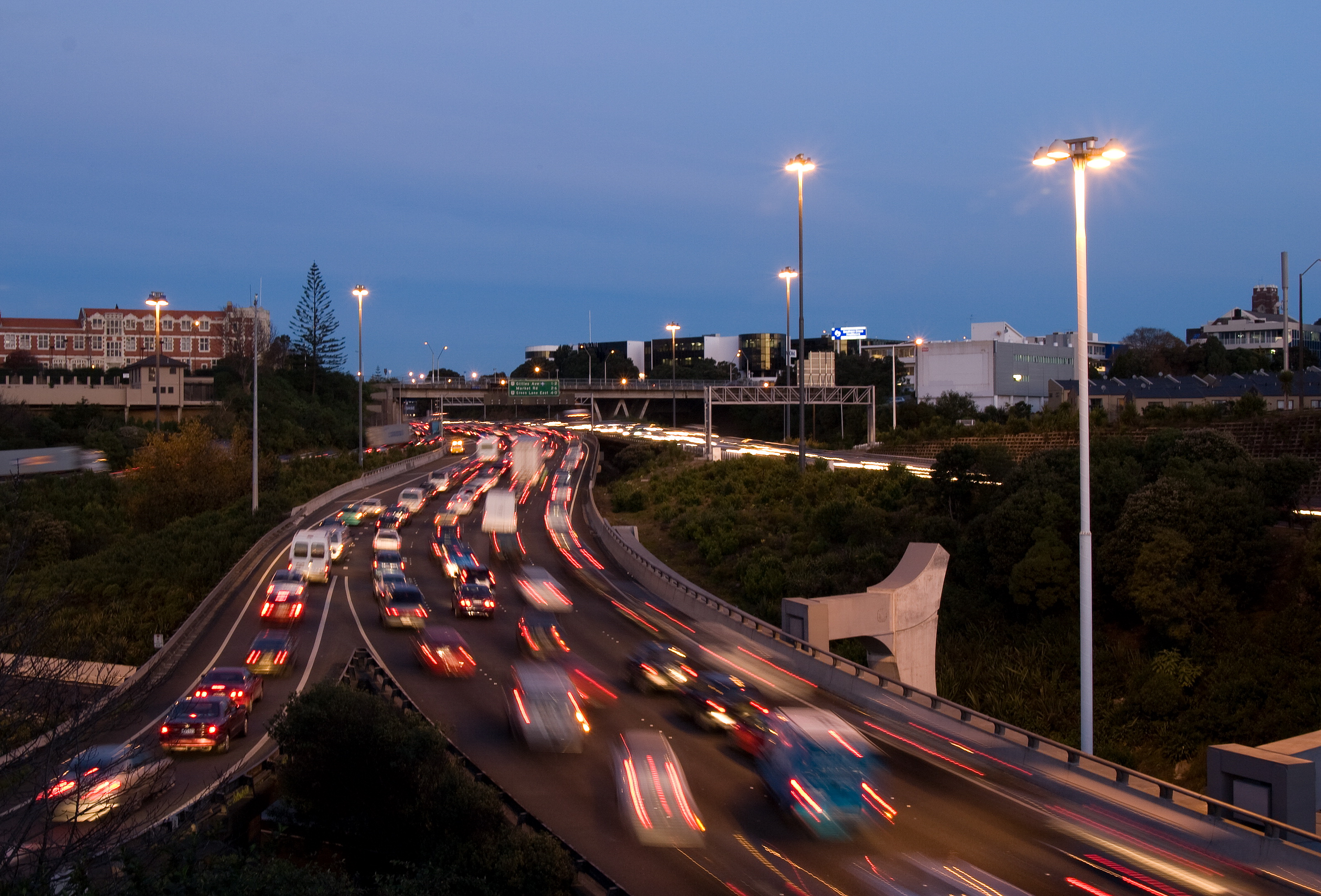
Auckland Southern Motorway in 2007

The automotive industry in New Zealand supplies a market which has always had one of the world's highest car ownership ratios. At the dealership level they have maintained their old retail chains in spite of the establishment of the many new independent businesses built since the 1980s by specialists in used imports from Japan. Toyota entered into direct competition with those used-import businesses refurbishing old Toyotas from Japan and selling them through their own dealers as a special line. The nation's car fleet is accordingly somewhat older than in most developed countries.

New Zealand no longer assembles passenger cars. Assembly plants closed after tariff protection was removed and distributors found it cheaper to import cars fully assembled. Cars had been assembled at a rate nearing 100,000 a year in 1983, but with the country's economic difficulties their numbers dropped sharply. Towards the end of the decade the removal of various restrictions as part of the nation's restructuring of its economy made available low-priced old used cars from Japan. These used cars met the local need for high ownership levels in a financially straitened world but since that time continue to arrive in such large numbers they substantially increase the average age of the nation's fleet.

Toyota and Ford dominate the new vehicle market but there were more new Mazda cars than Holden cars sold in 2018 while Ford and Nissan cars were no longer among the volume sellers. They were overtaken by Hyundai, Kia and Suzuki. Holden cars are sliding towards Ford sales levels in 2019. The small home market—the size of a large city—and distance from potential export customers combined with first-world pay rates against the formation of any significant indigenous manufacturers. Only small boutique kit and replica car firms were able to survive. They produce original kit and replica cars using locally made car bodies and imported componentry for both the local and international markets. Several of these, while small in size, are noted for the quality of their workmanship.

== First automobiles ==
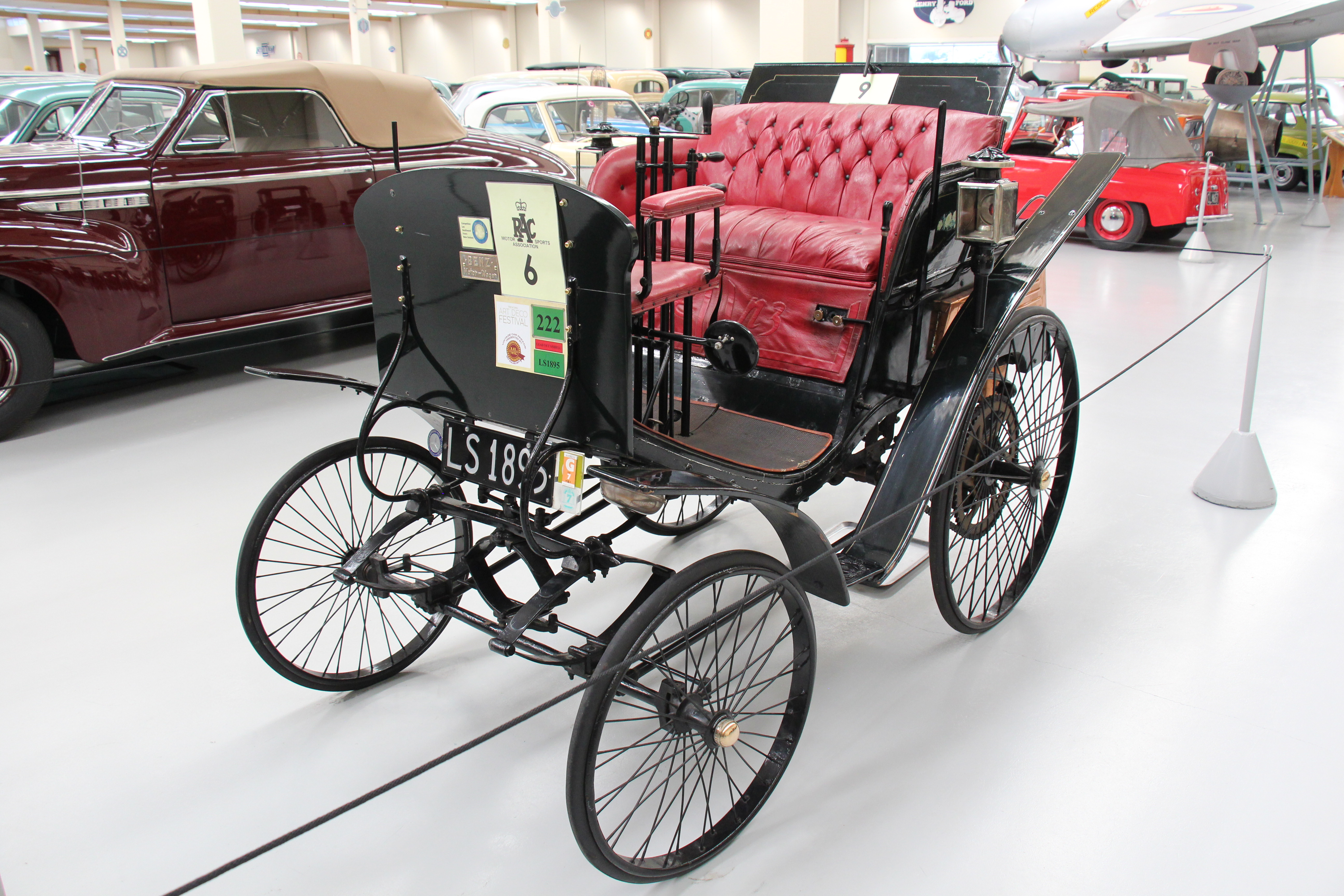
The 1895 Benz Velo brought back by Charles Nicholas Oates of Zealandia Cycle Works from Paris to Christchurch in October 1900

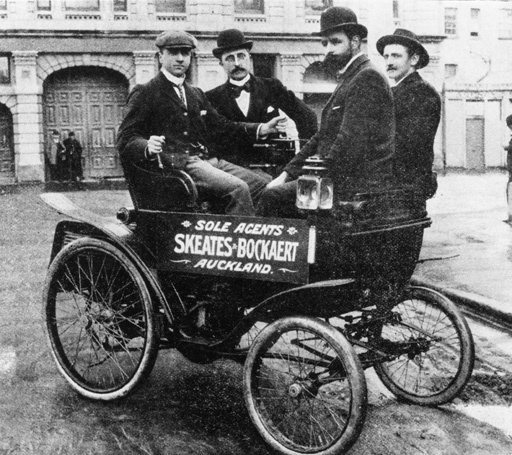
1899 Star 3 1/2 hp motor car with vis-à-vis body imported by the driver, Arthur Marychurch

The industry began with the importation in 1898 of two Carl Benz cars from Paris by William McLean. Apart from a few early attempts to build complete cars all chassis were imported. Local coachbuilders, out-priced, finally disappeared in the 1920s though not without representations to government. A few moved to assembly of complete cars or to making bus, truck and trailer bodies, sometimes both. New Zealand assembly of American CKD packs got properly under way in the 1920s, English CKD packs a full decade later.

McLean's motor cars arrived in Wellington from Sydney by the SS Rotomahana on 19 February 1898. They were a Benz Petrolette and a Benz Lightning. After McLean's Benz cars were imported it was almost two years before the next four-wheel car was imported.

A three-wheeler arrived in Auckland in November 1898 for Messrs George Henning and WM Service. At least three three-wheelers are said to have been imported in 1899 including a De Dion for Acton Adams of Christchurch and another for Robert and Frederick Maunsell of Masterton, sons of the missionary. All three arrived in September 1899, with Acton Adams's vehicle being involved in New Zealand's first motor vehicle accident two months later.

Young Auckland engineer Arthur Marychurch returned from England 12 months later with a four-wheeled Star, which he sold after a few weeks to Skeates and Bockaert. They took up the Star agency and sold this first car to Christchurch grocers Wardell Bros.

The three motor-tricycles were followed in 1900 by a Darracq and a Locomobile steam car along with a Pope-Toledo, Eagle, Argyll, Oldsmobile and Daimler. In 1903, 153 cars and motorbikes were imported. Cars in 1903 cost more than twice the average annual income meaning the market was limited to the wealthy. Petrol or Benzine was not readily available except as a lighting fuel for certain lamps and in some instances for sufficient quantity owners had to order it from Sydney, Australia. By 1925 imports had increased to over 20,000 cars a year.

== Early indigenous cars ==
If steam-powered vehicles are counted, the first vehicles were believed to be a steam buggy constructed by a Mr Empson of Christchurch in 1870 and a steam buggy imported from Edinburgh by John Gillies of Dunedin, also in 1870. There is no information about Empson's vehicle. The first traction engine, an 8 hp Reading Iron Works traction engine, had only been imported three years earlier. Gillies steam buggy was more probably a Thomson Road Steamer and not a steam buggy. Gillies sold the Thomson to the Canterbury Provincial government in 1871 for £1,200. These were followed by professor Robert Julian Scott's 1881 steam buggy, which was the first indigenous designed self propelled vehicle in New Zealand.

There is debate about who made the first petrol driven vehicle. Timaru engineer Cecil Wood made a petrol engine in 1897, but later made an unsubstantiated claim to have created and driven a three-wheel vehicle in 1896 followed by a four-wheel vehicle in 1898. His first independently confirmed vehicles date from 1901.

On 3 May 1898 a Nelson newspaper reported that a Mr Sewell of the Upper Buller had constructed a motor car and was to drive it to Wakefield that week. A letter to The Evening Post's editor later that year stated that there were two engineering firms in Wellington constructing motor car engines. Whether Wood, Sewell, or the engineering firms made a roadworthy vehicle at this time is not known as there were no further articles about them.

The first New Zealand designed and constructed automobile known to have run was made by Frederick Dennison. It was a motor tricycle reported in the local newspaper on 8 May 1900. The article stated that Dennison intended to convert the tricycle to a four-wheel motor-car. He did so and drove it from Christchurch to Oamaru in July 1900. It was the only one made and was destroyed by fire on its return journey. A replica of this car was completed and driven in June 2000 in celebration of its first journey.

This was followed by several models constructed by Wood between 1901 and 1903, Alexander Reid of Stratford's steam cars from 1903 to 1906, Gary Methven of Dunedin's petrol driven car, Pat and Thomas Lindsay of Timaru's steam cars in 1903, and Topliss Brothers of Christchurch's car in 1904. A Blenheim engineer, John Birch, constructed the Marlborough in 1912 and several cars named Carlton's between 1922 and 1928 at Gisborne. One of these is still in existence with the Gisborne vintage car club.

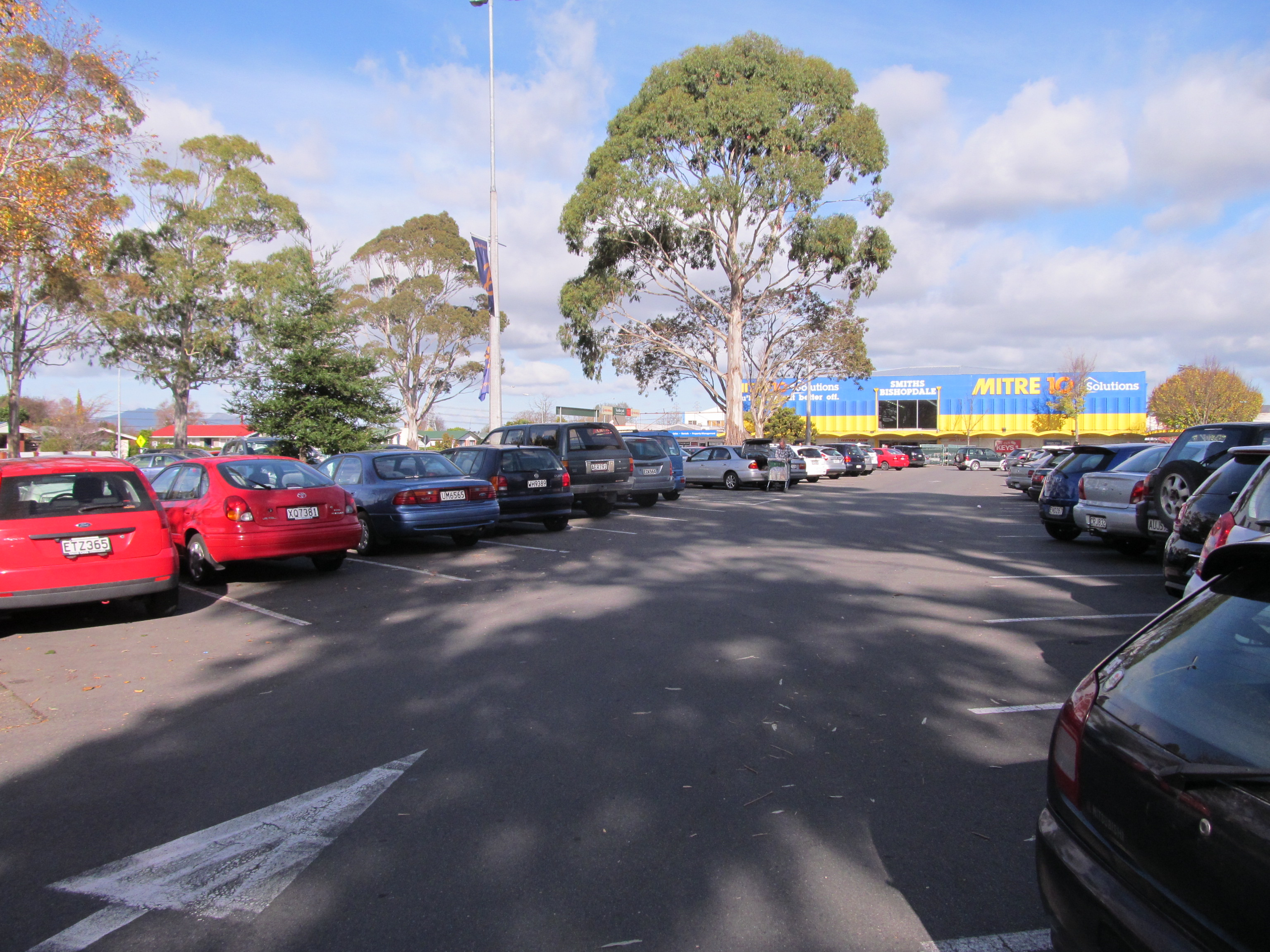
Bishopdale Mall, May 2014

== Level of car ownership ==
The number of cars owned per 1,000 persons (Note: Persons per car in New Zealand 1958 4.8 1959 4.8 1960 4.7 1961 4.6 1962 4.5 1963 4.3 1964 4.1 1965 3.8 1966 3.7 1967 3.5 1968 3.4 1969 3.3 1970 3.3 1971 3.0 1972 3.0 1973 2.9 1974 2.8 1975 2.7 1976 2.7 1977 2.6 1978)

- 1924: USA 143, Canada 77, New Zealand 71, Australia 23, United Kingdom 14, France 11
- 1967: New Zealand 293, Canada 283, Australia 274, Sweden 250.
- 2011: Canada 662, Sweden 520, Australia 731, New Zealand 708. (years:— Canada 2014, Sweden 2010, Australia 2015, New Zealand 2011)

== Impact of legislation ==
Government legislation has always had a major impact on the New Zealand industry. The first automobile legislation was the McLean Motor Car Act 1898 rushed through by McLean just before his cars were unloaded. It legalised the operation of motor vehicles, providing they were lit after dark, and did not go faster than 20 kilometres (12 miles) per hour. The Motor Cars Regulation Act 1902 followed. A tariff did apply to cars and car parts brought into New Zealand, although with McLean's cars there was some initial confusion as to what rate might apply. In 1906 local coach makers sought an increase in the tariff to 50 percent for completely built up vehicles (Note: The request was for duties to be imposed as follows: drays £10 single buggies £15 double buggies £20 station waggons £20 business waggons £20 landaus £75 broughams £75 wagonettes £30 hansoms £50 tramcar bodies £150 sulkies and roadsters £10 gigs and hooded buggies £20 phaetons £20 dogcarts £20 victorias £50 motor car bodies 50 per cent ad valorem) and in 1907 a 20 percent tariff was introduced on cars that arrived in New Zealand already assembled to protect them but there remained no duty on chassis.

=== America's domination ===
Higher duties were imposed on imports from countries outside the British Empire. Nevertheless, new cars registered during 1917 show rather more than 90 percent of New Zealand's cars originated in North America (Note: Countries of Origin First registrations during 1917 Britain —— - 415 — 6.2% USA — — -4,122 — 61.7% Canada — 1,976 — 29.6% France — — 104 — 1.6% Italy — — —- 14 — 0.2% Other — — —48 — 0.7% Total 6,679 Districts in which registered: Auckland and Poverty Bay 1,875 Hawkes Bay 626 Taranaki 482 Wellington including Rangitikei, Wairarapa 1,505 Nelson Marlborough 242 Canterbury 1,037 Westland 52 Otago and Southland 860 Total 6,679) During World War I the tariff on car bodies was reduced to 10 percent but the same rate was also imposed on the previously free chassis. Import statistics of the time provide different quantities for bodies and more numerous chassis no mention of complete cars. Unlike in Australia local coachbuilders lost business in the early 1920s. Some of the bigger firms ended up producing only commercial vehicles, truck cabs, trailers but mainly bus bodies, for example New Zealand Standard Motor Bodies (Munt Cottrell) in Petone, Steel Bros in Christchurch. Some simply became motor retailers themselves like Auckland's Schofields in Newmarket.

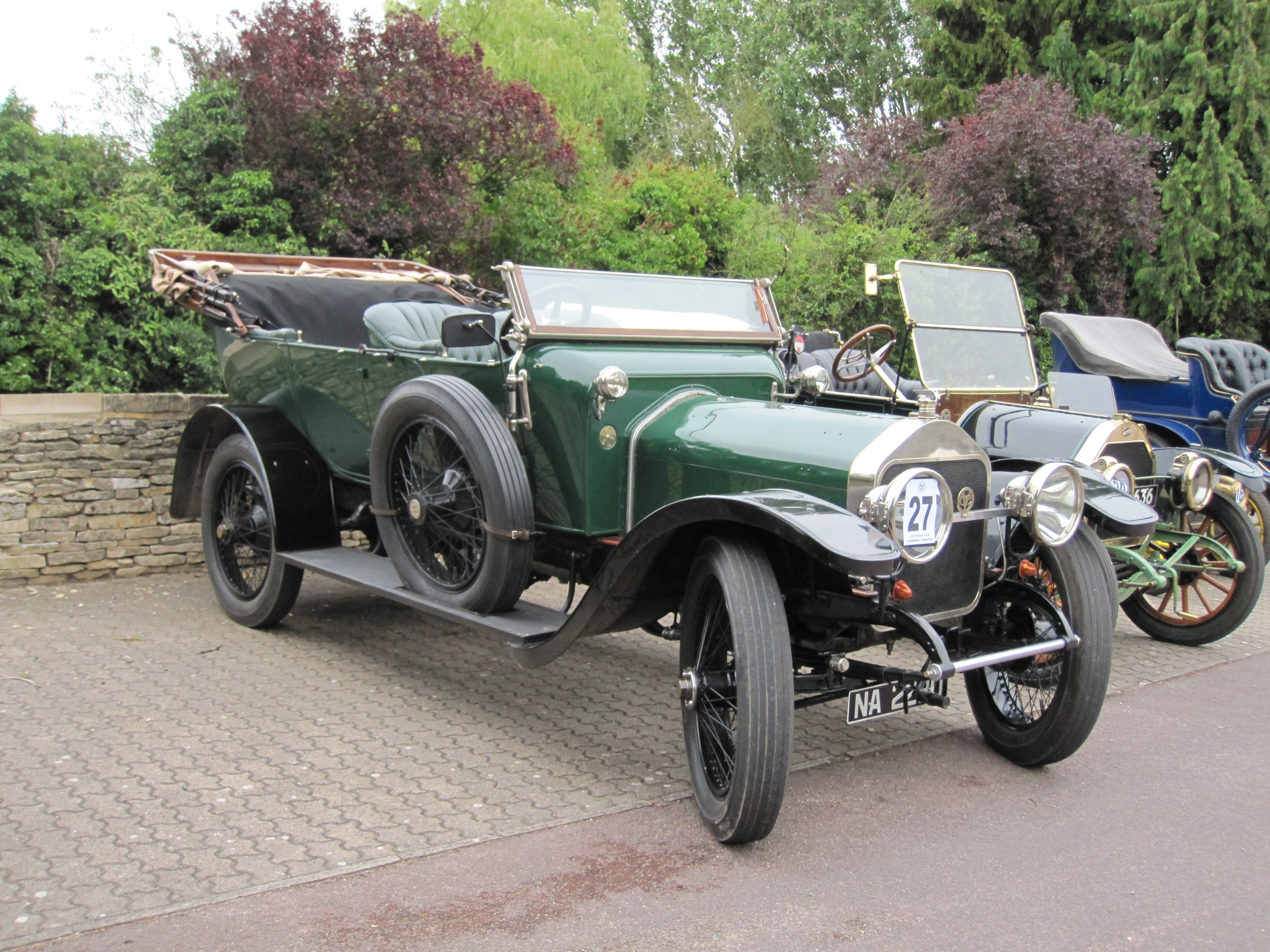
Wolseley 24-30 Colonial tourer 1913

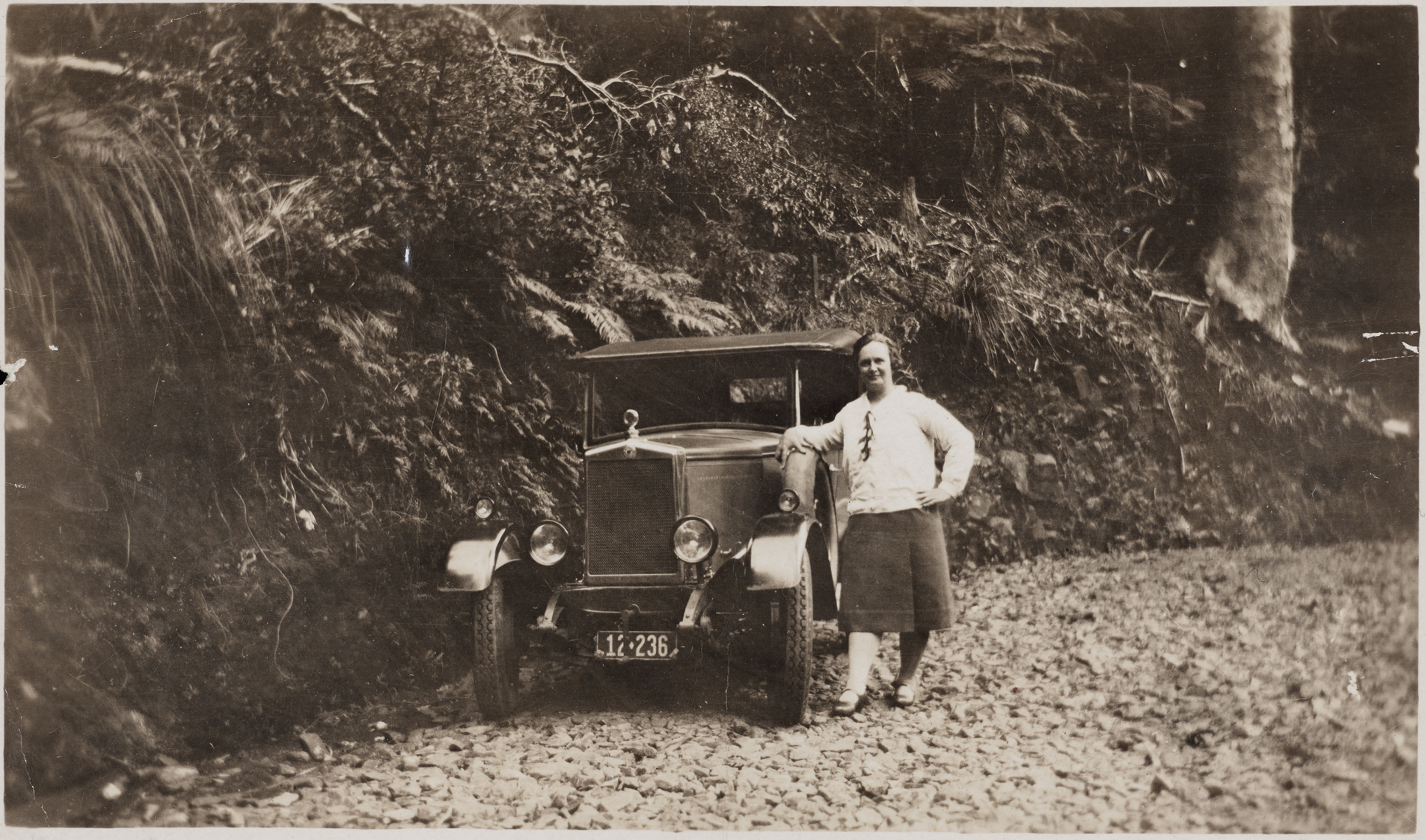
Morris Cowley freshly metalled and rolled road 1929

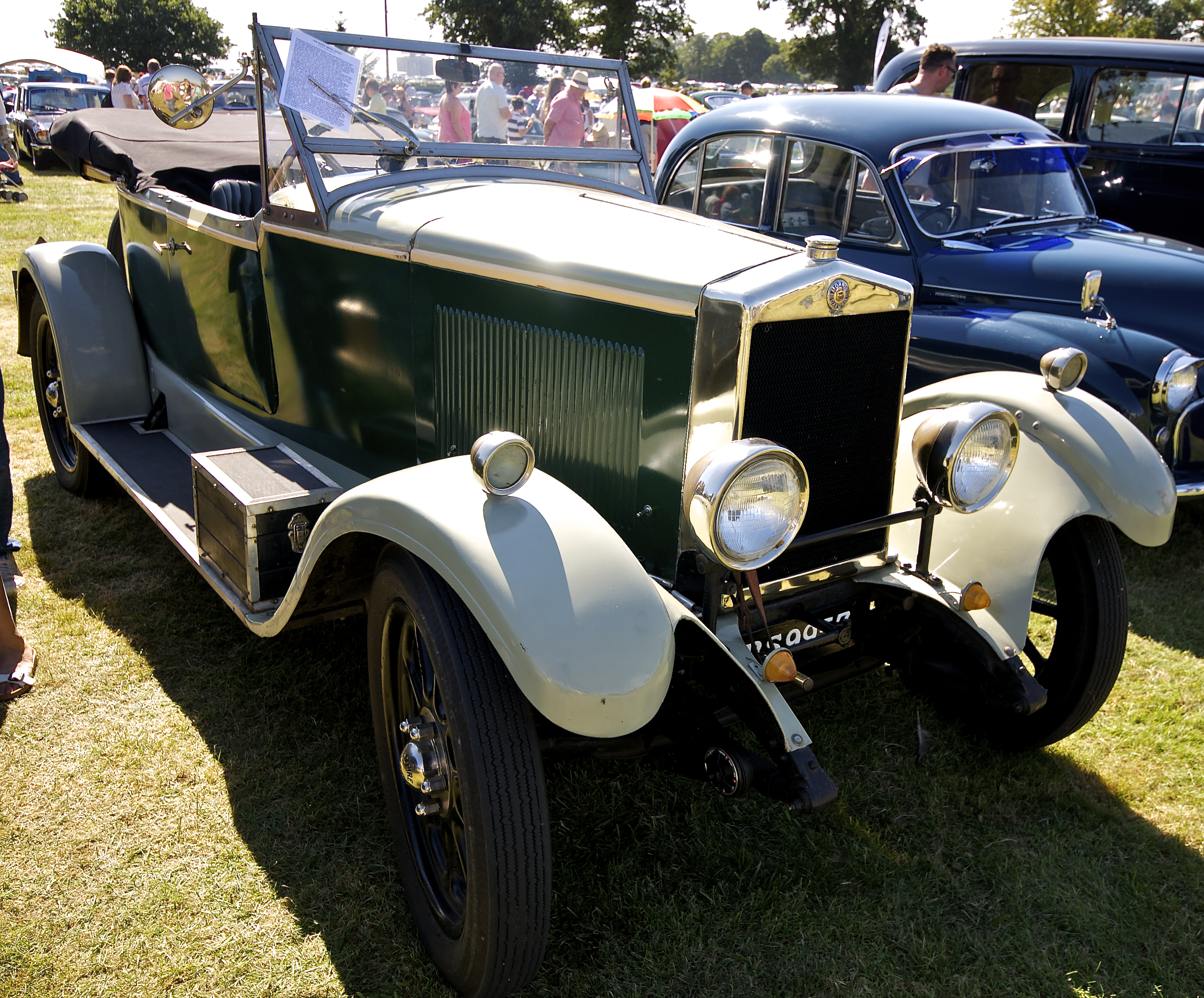
Morris Oxford Empire models

Before World War I motoring was reserved for the prosperous. Roads in cities and towns may have been very dusty but were smooth and well-formed. Townsfolk were on the whole satisfied with their English cars designed for the same conditions, built with care to high engineering standards but with only lip-service to interchangeability of parts. They required regular expensive maintenance at short intervals. American cars were built in large quantities and thus cheaper, designed by much better engineers and built for bad surfaces and to cope with irregular maintenance which might be hard to find even in their homeland.

Right through until World War II English manufacturers strove to present the colonies with their Special Colonial models intended to be easier to care for, to be sturdier and with adequate ground clearance but without real success in South Africa, Australia or New Zealand. The great success of the original Morris Oxford arose from its ease of driving and its reliability, both attributed to all the mechanical components being of U.S. design if not provenance. On the whole American cars were better more modern cars and much cheaper and much better suited to New Zealand conditions.

During the 1920s, the most common vehicles were U.S. brands made in Canada (to attract reduced Imperial Preference duties) or USA. (Note: General Motors Ford and Chrysler ran wholly owned plants in Windsor, Ontario a short distance from Detroit manufacturing cars largely of Canadian components, often bearing special Canadian brand names, and built them with right-hand-drive for sale in Britain, India, Australia, New Zealand and South and East Africa.) For example, in the first nine months of 1927, out of 8,888 cars sold the five top-selling brands, 4,612 cars, were all North American. The top three were Ford in first place with 1,651 vehicles sold, Chevrolet in second place with 1,100 vehicles sold, and Essex (by Hudson) in third place with 898 vehicles sold. (Note: Cars sold January to September 1927 1,651 Ford 1,100 Chevrolet 898 Essex (Hudson) 486 Dodge 471 Chrysler 379 Buick 359 Overland Whippet 297 Rugby 252 Studebaker 206 Hudson P- 165 Oldsmobile 157 Nash 132 Willys-Knight 108 Hupmobile 105 Oakland 92 Pontiac 62 Erskine 47 Paige 27 Cadillac P + 22 Packard P + 19 Chandler 9 Reo 8 Velie 8 Flint: 7066 North American 80 per cent; 182 Fiat 6 Ansaldo 37 Citroen 257 "Other": 482 European and other 5 per cent; 449 Morris 387 Austin 78 Clyno 77 Singer 67 Standard 63 Crossley P + 55 Rover P - 40 Armstrong-Siddeley P + 33 Humber P + 19 Sunbeam P + 17 Bean 13 Talbot P + 10 Hillman 9 Vauxhall 9 Wolseley 8 Swift 5 Star 1 Arrol Johnson P +: 1340 United Kingdom 15 per cent; P = expensive prestige cars) At the onset of the Great Depression car imports fell away. (Note: Year ——— total———Canada———USA——Britain——Europe; 1925 —— 22,326 ——— 9,935 —— 8,502 —— 3,442 —— 447 1926 —— 15,776 ——— 3,528 —— 9,659 —— 2,176 —— 413 1927 —— 10,871 ——— 2,336 —— 6,122 —— 2,128 —— 285 1928 —— 16,504 ——— 4,783 —— 9,227 —— 2,364 —— 130 1929 —— 23,361 ——- 10,740 —— 8,529 —— 4,064 ——- 28 1930 —— 14,314 ——— 8,025 —— 3,047 —— 3,231 ——- 11 1931 ——-- 3,388 ———-- 482 ——-- 475 —— 2,414 ——- 17 1932 ——-- 3,044 ———-- 358 ——-- 146 —— 2,537 ——-- 3 1933 ——-- 2,933 ———-- 470 ——-- 190 —— 2,272 ——-- 1 1934 —— 11,747 ——— 2,315 —— 3,778 —— 5,654——-- 0 1935 —— 17,824 ——— 2,619 —— 5,559 —— 9,646——-- 0 1936 —— 24,229 ——— 4,572 —— 6,335 —-- 13,321 ——- 1 1937 —— 30,331 ——— 7,398 —— 4,851 —-- 18,079 ——- 2 1938 —— 28,380——— 7,735 —— 2,718 —-- 17,630 —— 297 1939 —— 25,096 ——— 9,677 —— 1,501 —- 13,918 ——— 0 1940 ——- 5,038 ————- 31 ——— 179 —— 4,828 ——— 0)

=== Cars from Britain ===
In 1934 government announced tariffs intended to further protect Empire trade while encouraging local assembly. The level of imports began to rise at this time and by 1940 42 percent had been added to the size of the nation's car fleet. British sourced vehicles took a much larger share. The prosperity of country districts with the bad roads and the demand for big strongly built economically priced American cars did not revive until the end of the decade or the outbreak of war.

Another factor locking in market shares was an urgent need to conserve foreign currency which saw the government introduce import quotas at the end of 1938. Licences were allocated to local importers in proportion to their imports in the previous year. Because the new licensing system was based on recent history it kept North American imports at an artificially low level when their market was reviving.

Unless they bought their erstwhile distributor and with that business its entitlement to the necessary licences without the history car manufacturers could not enter the New Zealand market but this new factor had no effect until after the war. The outcome was to be quite a large number of mostly small, New Zealand owned, possibly under-capitalised assembly plants. They often sought substantial support from their foreign suppliers.

=== Australia and Japan ===
British sourced cars maintained their new share into the 1960s when Detroit's big three began to replace British Vauxhalls and Ford Zephyrs with their Australian-made Holden Specials, Falcons and, later, Valiants which soon accounted for a third of the market. All locally assembled cars were their manufacturer's most basic, stripped-down versions with a tiny number of honourable exceptions, the brief post-war runs of Jaguars or Rovers. This was brought about by the struggle to meet demand within the amount of cash the government's exchange controls made available. One of the outcomes of import licensing was to make relatively new second hand vehicles more expensive than new ones. Another was the expectation that a car would be made to last a long time and undergo many repairs that would be regarded as uneconomic in almost any other market. This experience may account for the ready acceptance of so very many used imports. Any government intervention was designed to protect the New Zealand car assembly and related industries and to reduce the effect of vehicle purchases on the country's balance of payments with the rest of the world.

Japanese cars entered the market in the 1960s beginning local assembly by New Zealand owned businesses in the middle of that decade. One of their attractions was that they did not all display the stripped down to bare essentials look of the local cars.

By the 1980s—when the number of assembly plants reached its high of 16—following its relaxation of restrictions on importing CKD packs the government seemed to recognise, as did the Australian government 30 years later, it was cheaper and more efficient for cars to be assembled in the country where they were made.

A government Motor Vehicle Industry Development Plan was put into effect in 1984. It began by opening import competition, though spreading that over the four years to 1988, and by mid-1988 only seven of the 16 separate assembly plants remained in business. The government announced in December 1987 following a review of the plan that all import controls would be removed from 1 January 1989. At the same time a programme for reduction of tariffs on vehicles and their components was announced.

=== Used imports ===
As tariffs on imported cars were phased out a flood of second-hand Japanese imports swamped the new car market beginning decades of low or no growth in sales of new cars. Imports rose from less than 3,000 cars in 1985 to 85,000 in 1990. By 2004 over 150,000 vehicles were imported in one year. Second-hand Japanese cars made up the majority of these cars. Majority of tariffs were removed in 1998.

== Assembly process ==
- Body shell

assembly and welding
metal finish

Paint

preparation
spraying and drying — in the painting booth usually a plant's most expensive item

Hard trim —glass, instruments panel etc. and in some cases soft trim

- Body drop on engine suspension and wheels, soft trim —seats, upholstery added
- Final inspection

Kits

- Completely Knocked Down kits would require all the above processes
- Partly Knocked Down kits can be finished to the point of body drop but may also require all but body assembly and welding

Assembly plant buildings, plant, machinery and other equipment are not specific to the car assembly industry and could be used for many other activities. What is special is the use of the equipment to one purpose.

== Assembly plants ==
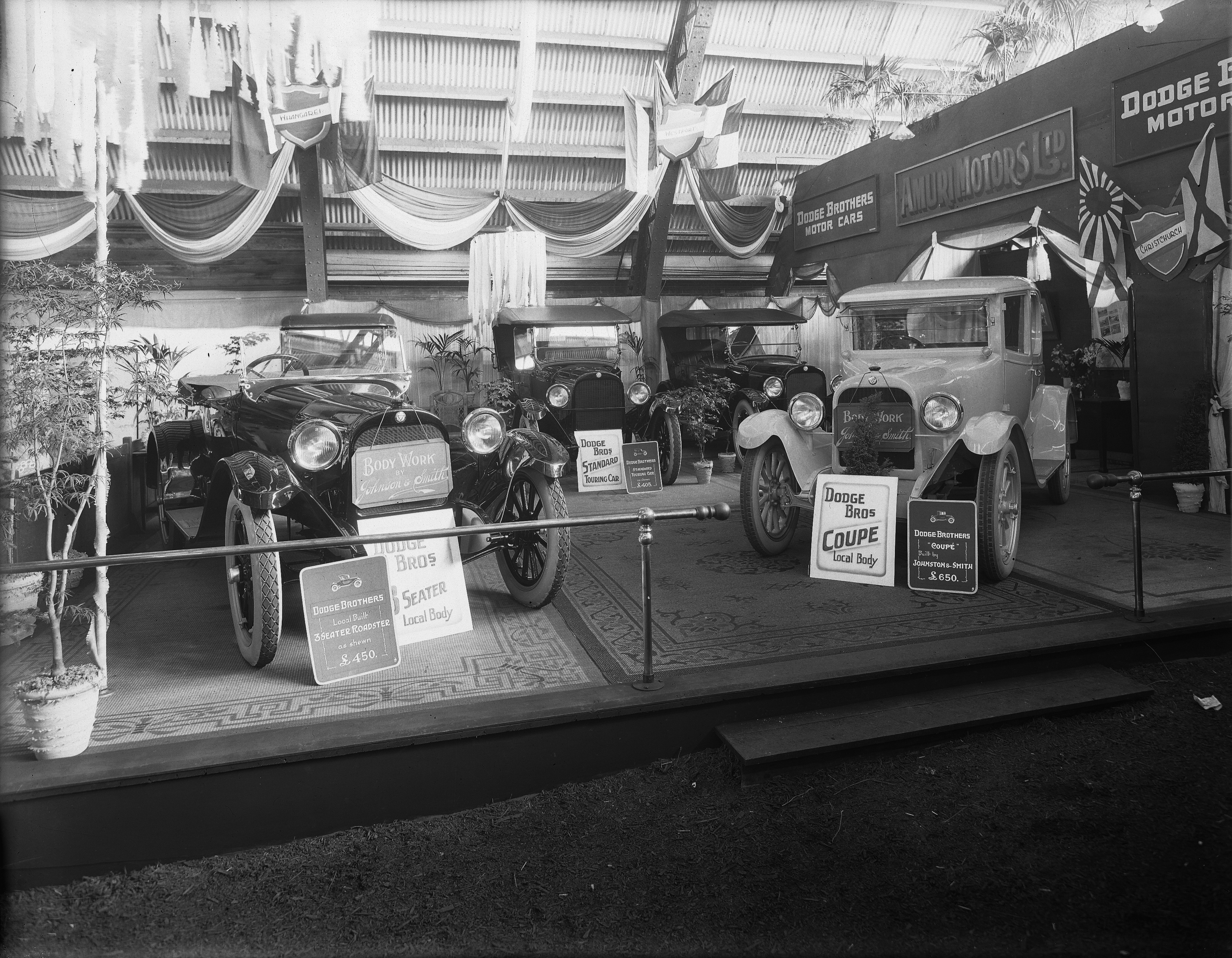
1920 Dodge cars by Amuri Motors with local bodies by Johnston & Smith

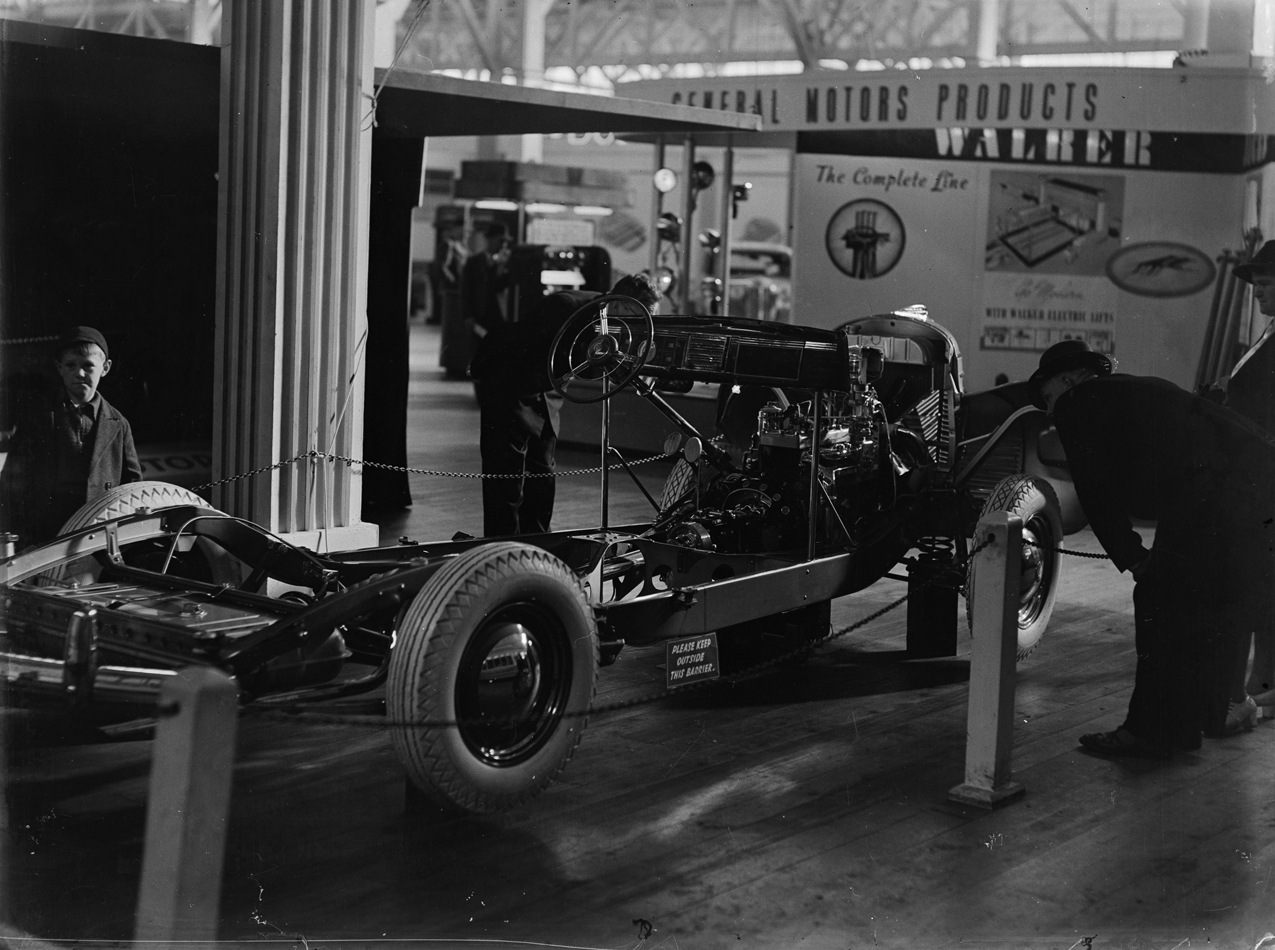
1939 Plymouth chassis ready for body drop on display at the New Zealand Centennial Exhibition 1939-1940

New Zealand's car assembly industry has its roots in pre-car trades. In the early 20th century, coachbuilders and wheelwrights quickly moved into building bodies for imported motor vehicle chassis. In 1926 after the announcement that General Motors would begin local assembly a deputation of members of the New Zealand Coach and Motor Body Builders' Federation waited on the Prime Minister asking for greater protection because they said American manufacturers were dumping cars in New Zealand and flooding the market. The Prime Minister deferred any decision until he had heard from other interested parties. The local managing director of General Motors responded that the failure of chassis imports to grow was "entirely due to public preference and price".

Until the advent of all-steel bodies which began in USA in 1915 with Dodge and began in Britain more than a decade later motor bodies in essence remained the upholstered structures of timber and sheet metal of 19th century carriages and the required skills were readily available. Imported bodies faced a duty of twenty percent, materials to be used in bodies manufactured in New Zealand entered duty-free. Initially chassis entered duty free with or without a body. In the six years ended March 1933 64,300 cars were imported but only 7,600 were given New Zealand made bodies and tariff protection ended.

From the 1920s to the mid-1930s American makes mostly sourced in Canada for Imperial Preference tariffs dominated the local assembly industry. Postwar supply was restricted by a dollar shortage then balance of payments difficulties and British later combined with Australian makes dominated. In the late 1960s assembly of Japanese vehicles began to supplant the British vehicles and by the end of the 1990s British vehicles had virtually disappeared.

=== 1912 WG Vining ===
While Dominion Motors of Wellington was the distributor for Hudson and Essex motor vehicles for North Island from 1912, distributorship for South Island, went to WG. Vining of Nelson, also beginning in 1912. Vining had built a 31,500 square feet (2,926.5 square metres) garage in 1908 which was the largest garage in New Zealand at the time. A car assembly plant was established at the premises and shortly thereafter Vinings obtained additional licenses to import and assemble Cadillac, Maxwell, Haynes, and Ford vehicles from the United States; Bean cars from the United Kingdom; and Darracq and Unic vehicles from France. The plant later assembled Chevrolet and Rover vehicles until they established their own New Zealand assembly operations. The business ceased when it was sold on 30 September 1927 upon W.G. Vining's retirement. Vining's son formed a new business, P Vining & Scott, and continued the Hudson and Essex franchise, adding Morris in 1932.

=== 1922 Colonial Motor Company ===
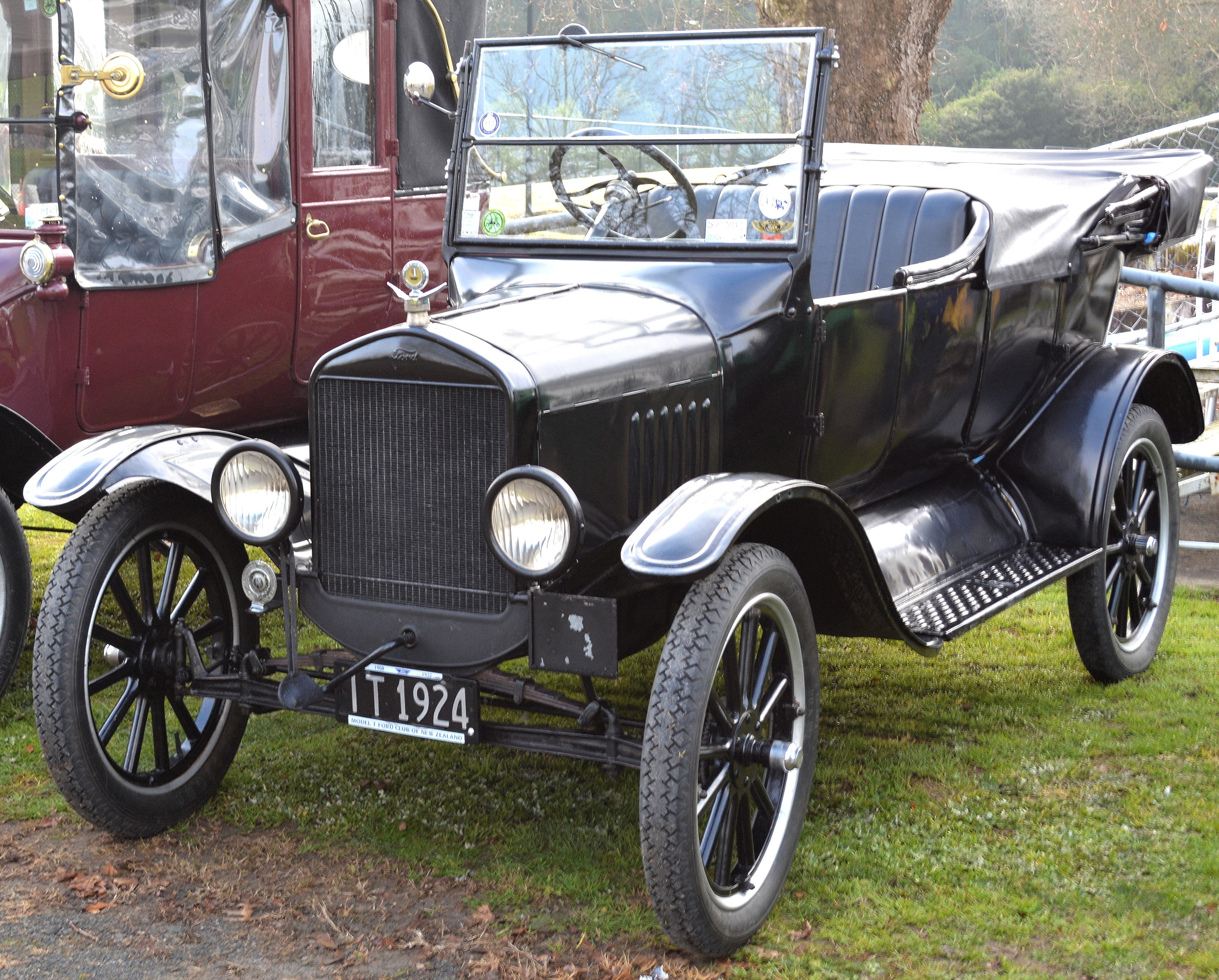
1924 Model T tourer Henry Ford day Hamilton

Rouse and Hurrell, coachbuilders and wheelwrights of Courtenay Place, Wellington, took up a Ford sole agency for New Zealand in 1908. In 1911 their business was transferred to a newly incorporated Colonial Motor Company.

CMC's first specialised car assembly building was begun in 1919 and completed in 1922 at 89 Courtenay Place, Wellington – a steel box of nine floors, its design and location on the nearest ground off the reclamation to deepwater Taranaki Street wharf based on the Ford assembly works in Ontario, Canada. The building stood over 30 metres high and was Wellington's tallest building at the time.

The top two floors were used for administration. Assembly of cars from imported packs of parts started on level 7, and finished vehicles were driven out the ground floor. CMC also built smaller assembly plants in Parnell, Auckland, and in Timaru. At the end of 1925 staff numbers were 641: Wellington 301, Parnell 188 and Timaru 152 people. At that time daily output was: 25, 20 and 18 respectively. In the 1970s Wellington's former assembly building was given a new facade inspired by a car radiator.

=== 1926 General Motors ===
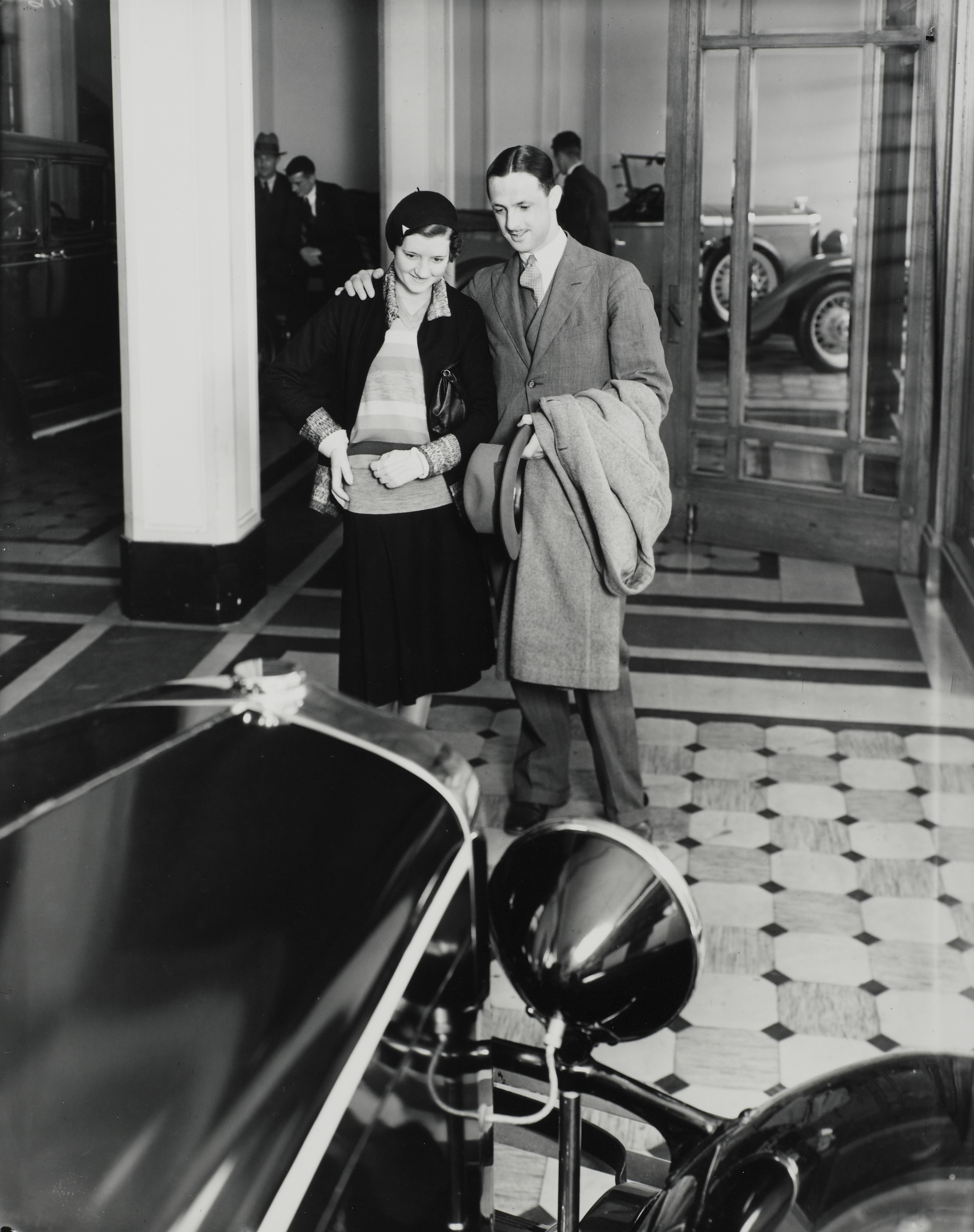
Advertisement in Lower Taranaki Street

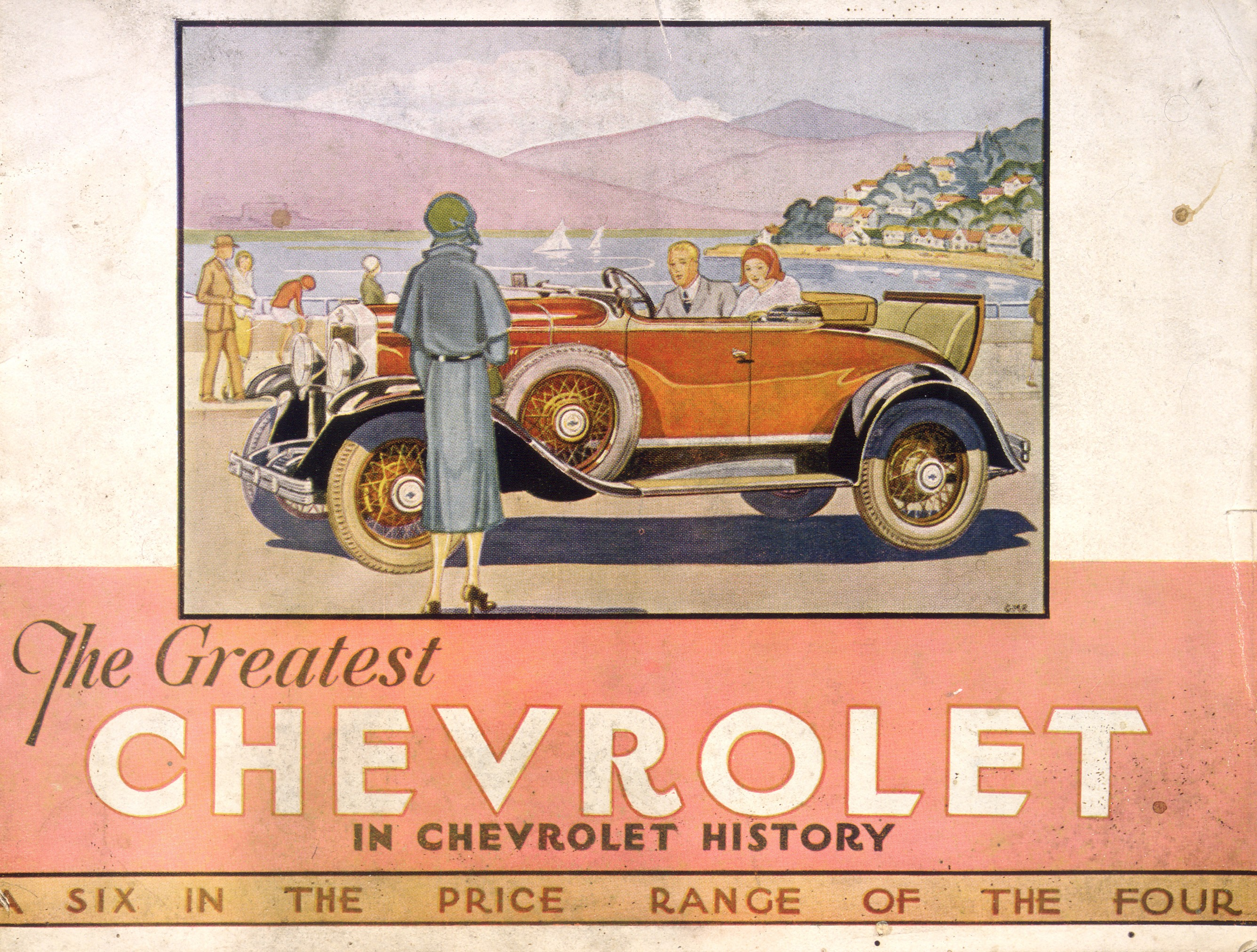
Locally printed colour brochure features Oriental Bay

In 1926, General Motors New Zealand was formed, opening an assembly plant in well-established industrial area, Petone, in the Hutt Valley. In its first twelve months ended mid September 1927 the plant assembled 2,191 cars. In late 1929 GM was able to report the following locally sourced materials were used in their cars: wool in the upholstery, Miro timber for commercial bodies, varnishes, glues, enamels and numerous small parts, glass would shortly be added. Other articles which in GM's opinion should be made locally included carpets and top material and its necessary padding. All associated advertising literature was locally printed and in colour. At first, it produced American Chevrolet, Pontiac and Buick cars, adding Oldsmobile in 1928.

Its first British Vauxhalls were built in 1931, along with Bedford trucks. In its first eight years it assembled more than 25,000 vehicles.

By the late 1930s the plant employed 760 and was building GM's Frigidaire commercial refrigerators. Silencers or mufflers were added to the range of products, 172,000 of them were made in the next ten years. A run of German Opel Kadetts was put through. The factory's size was almost doubled in 1939, more than six acres were now under roof and the site had been expanded to 12 1/4 acres incorporating a cricket ground, sports field and parking for employees' cars and bicycles. This Petone plant closed in 1984 and production was moved to Trentham.

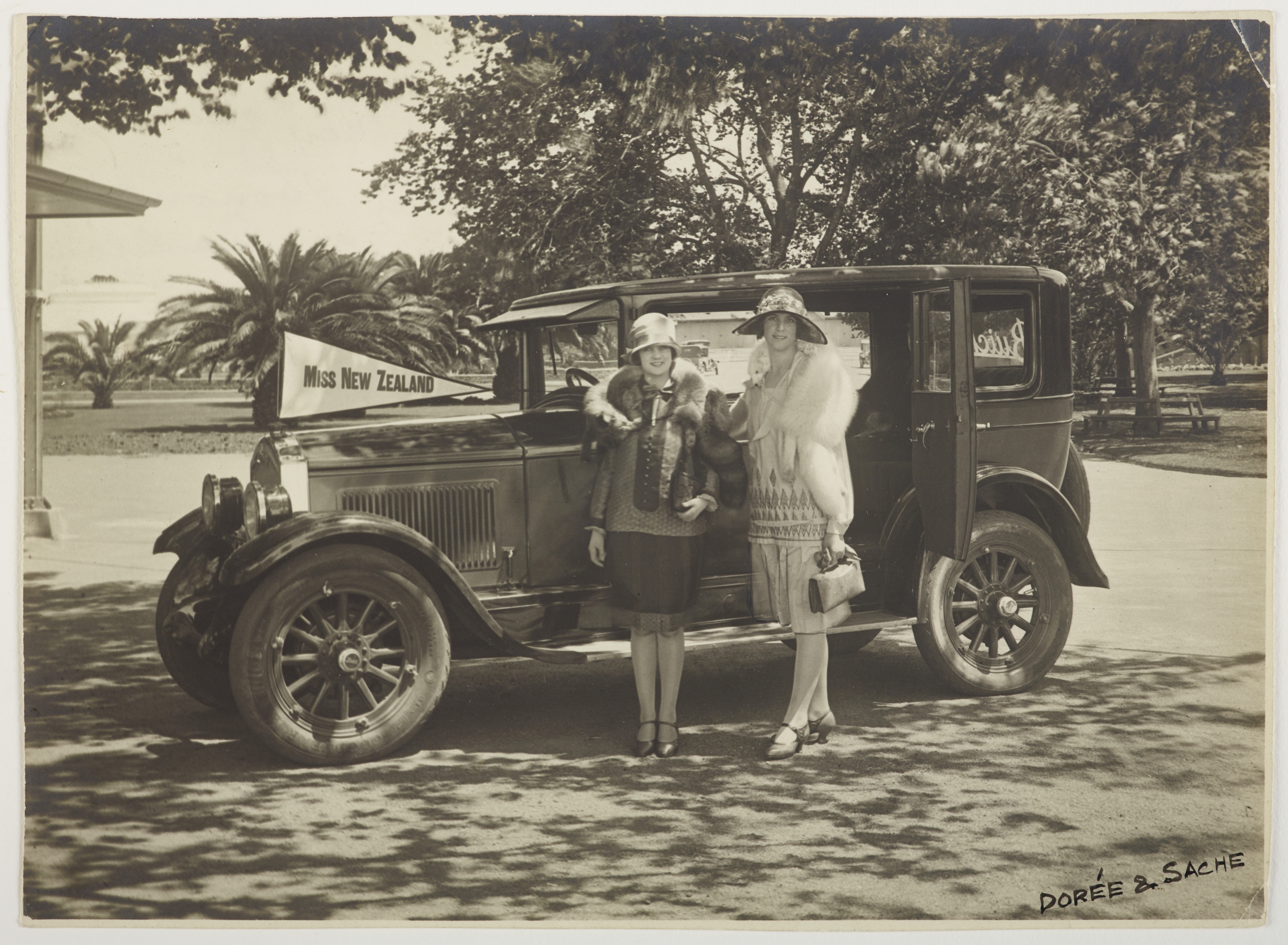
Statuesque Miss New Zealand 1927 at Ellerslie with her New Zealand assembled 1927 Buick

Australian Holdens were first introduced as assembled cars in 1954, but the first Holden from General Motors’ Petone plant, an FE Series, emerged in 1957. A large new plant at Trentham in the Hutt Valley was opened in 1967, where General Motors built such vehicles as the Australian Holden HQ series and UK Vauxhall Viva during the 1970s and Commodore during the 1980s.

By the early 1970s, more than 80 percent of New Zealand's new cars were supplied by General Motors, Ford, Todd Motors and New Zealand Motor Corporation. By 1990 the General Motors plant at Trentham had been reduced to a truck assembly operation, later to close altogether.

General Motors New Zealand changed its name to Holden New Zealand on 15 July 1994.

=== 1931 Rover ===
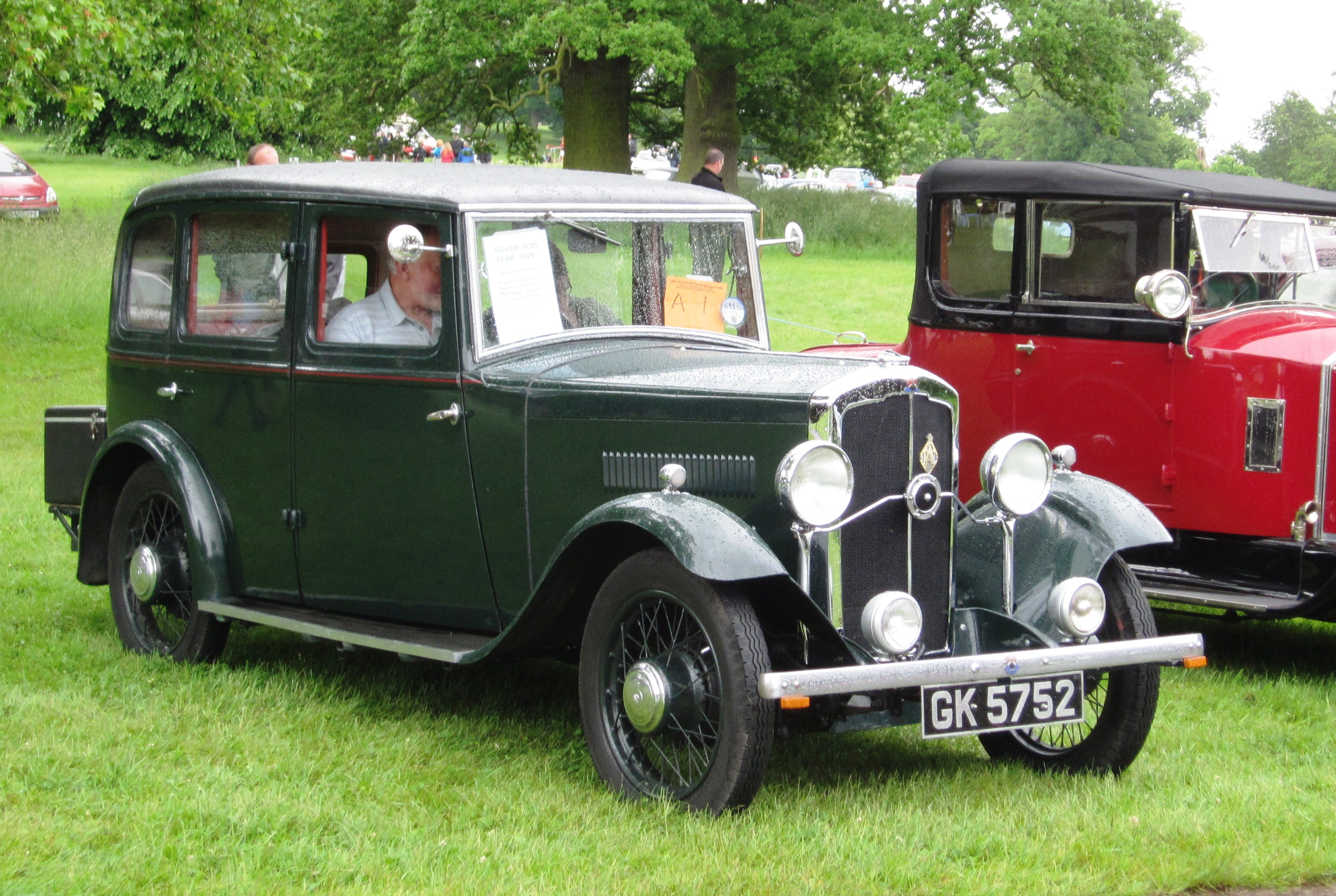
Rover 10-25

In July 1931 the Rover Company of New Zealand told local newspapers a building was in course of erection at 35 Jackson Street, Petone where it would assemble Rover cars. It was hoped the building would be completed before Christmas. New Zealand materials would be used as far as possible. Parts that couldn't be made locally would be imported from the English factory.

The new factory was formally opened by Prime Minister George Forbes on 17 February 1932 in the presence of among others the chairman of the Development of Industries Board and the Rover managing director from England. Forbes noted the Rover company was the first English company to open an overseas chassis assembly and bodybuilding plant in any part of the Empire. He also said "Britain bought our produce and it was only right for New Zealand to buy in return from Britain". The only imported material in the bodywork was the leather and the steel panels.

The price of the car, Rover's Family Ten, was reduced 5 percent the following July "with the benefit of economies arising out of New Zealand manufacture". It was described as greatly improved over the imported car having special bodywork, strengthened chassis frame, heavier rear springs etc. all to suit local conditions.

In February 1932 Rover Coventry announced strengthening of their Family Ten chassis by using heavier gauge material and re-designed cross members to improve torsional rigidity. These improvements were, they said, the outcome of lengthy testing on New Zealand's and Australia's roughest roads carried out to make the cars suitable for overseas use.

By July 1933 the former Rover factory premises were vacant and advertised for sale. In 1935 tin plate printers and canister manufacturers J Gadsden and Company, subsidiary of an Australian business of the same name, were making four-gallon petrol cans (benzine tins) in the former Rover building.

== Government action ==
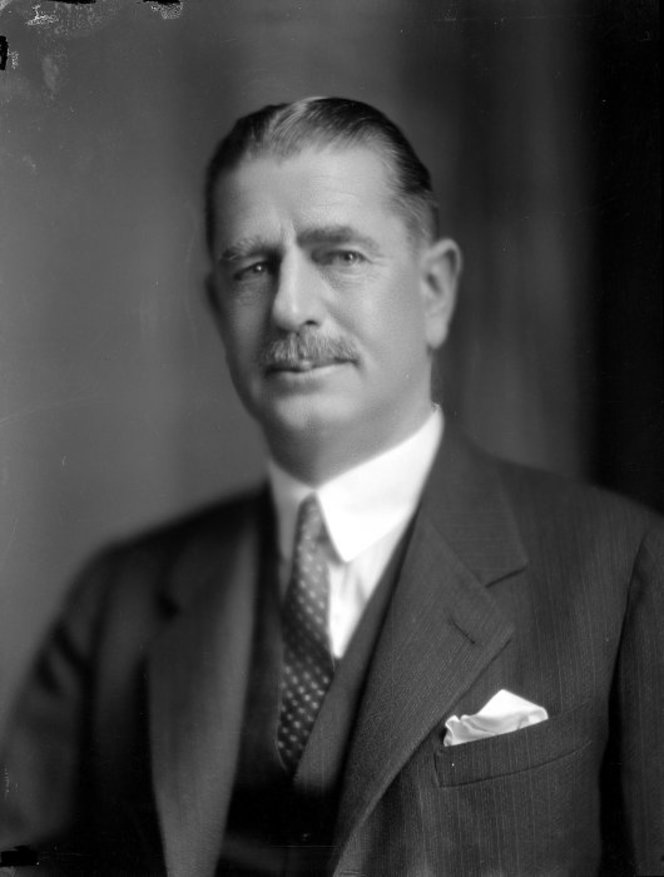
Gordon Coates, minister of finance

A factor identified as economic nationalism. In 1927 when 80 percent of cars were imported from North America the method of calculating duty was adjusted in the hope of encouraging imports of the smaller British cars and more importantly encouraging more enterprises into local assembly. At the height of the depression the government announced its determination to ensure as much as possible work should be done by New Zealand labour. In August 1934 Minister of Finance Gordon Coates announced that as the present tariff concessions had not been sufficient to encourage foreign manufacturers to assemble their cars in New Zealand the new duties to take effect from 1 January 1935 would be:

Complete vehicles: British 15 percent, others 60 percent
Unassembled vehicles: British 5 percent, others 50 percent

A definition of completely knocked down (CKD) would be fixed by the minister and modified to ensure an increasing use of locally sourced materials.

The motor vehicle trade's response was that they considered the reduction in tariff for ckd imports would not pay for the cost of local assembly

=== Completely knocked down ===
The minister's determination for 1935

The industry had always been encouraged to increase local content. Compliance required importers to bring in the chassis frame assembled with its engine and gearbox but no other parts attached. Scuttle and windscreen could be assembled and primed. The body shell could be assembled and primed. Upholstery materials could not be sewn but might be cut to shape. There was no restriction on the components included in the CKD pack. The first determination was published in the New Zealand Gazette of 18 October 1934.

1939

Having lost the local bodybuilding trade, upholsterers found they could not survive and in 1939 upholstery materials could no longer be included in imported CKD packs, nor could batteries and the degree of assembly of imported components was further restricted.

Inclusion of a banned item attracted full duty to the whole CKD pack.

=== Import quotas by value ===
Import licensing or fixed quotas to ration imported cars— and all other imports—were first announced at the end of 1938. Commentators expressed concern that this was a short step from a total takeover of the country's import trade and at least would allow the government to issue licences in such proportions and to such persons or businesses as it might choose. The minister's announcement was greeted by the chairman of the Primary Producers Federation with the description: "the Hitler plan" adding (even if it was a) "retreat from the Moscow road".

The purpose was to conserve foreign exchange and to protect local industry, in particular to promote manufacturing to improve employment opportunities and to reduce the economy's reliance on the rural sector. During the war the restrictions were generally recognised to be necessary but they were not dismantled only eased when conditions improved. In the early 1950s the import licensing system was overhauled and many categories were made exempt. The same period saw the beginning of the safety-valve no-remittance licence scheme. A balance-of-payments crisis in 1957 brought new controls (Note: unassembled cars cut by 25 per cent, assembled cars by 50 per cent in Arnold Nordmeyer's emergency controls (The Times 6 January 1958 page 4) followed in June 1968 by his Black Budget) to restrict imports but by foreign exchange allocation. Another foreign exchange crisis in 1967 brought a reversal of the easing during the previous decade. (Note: new cars cut by 20 per cent due to collapse in market for NZ wool. (NZ seeks IMF loan. The Times 8 May 1967 page 22)) A new policy in 1979 allowed importers to obtain extra licenses when they could show "significantly deficient" price/quality differentials between local and imported products. By the early 1980s the industry employed around 8,000 workers. However, by 1981 official thinking had begun to swing away from import controls considering they did not in the long run remedy underlying conditions though they might be entirely successful at controlling imports. If the intention was to protect local industry tariffs, officials considered, would be a more efficient tool.

Accordingly, by 1984 economic liberalisation, reduced protection for local businesses and deregulation were becoming official policy. A rationalisation scheme was underway when a new government elected in July 1984 found it was facing a foreign exchange crisis and chose to deal with the economic situation with these new tools. The automotive assembly industry was recognised to be essentially artificial. Its poor build quality meant consumers preferred imported cars. The cost of a fully assembled car on Auckland's wharves was barely more than the cost of a CKD kit. In December 1984 all controls on outward and inward foreign exchange transactions were lifted and the same month the Motor Vehicle Industry Plan 1984 was approved. The Closer Economic Relations agreement with Australia stopped immediate free trade in cars and components. Import licensing for most goods was removed in July 1988 and the process of removing controls protecting the motor industry further accelerated. A final review was set down for 1992.

In 1985 New Zealand supported 14 assembly plants but by 1989 five of those had closed. In that same period Toyota, Nissan, Mitsubishi and Honda bought out their local assemblers.

The following plants closed between 1984 and 1990:

Ford Motor Co — Lower Hutt
Mazda Motors — Otahuhu
Motor Holdings — Otahuhu and Waitara
New Zealand Motor Corporation - Honda — Auckland
Nissan — Otahuhu
Suzuki — Wanganui
General Motors – Upper Hutt

leaving the following passenger plants (and three commercial plants; worker numbers are as at 1997)

Toyota — Christchurch (commercial) September 1996
VANZ (Mazda and Ford) — Manukau City March 1997
Mitsubishi — Porirua June 1998 (360 workers)
Nissan — Wiri July 1998 (230 workers)
Honda — Nelson closed August 1998 (220 workers)
Toyota — Thames October 1998 (330 workers)

== Assembly plants continued ==
=== 1935 Todd Motors ===
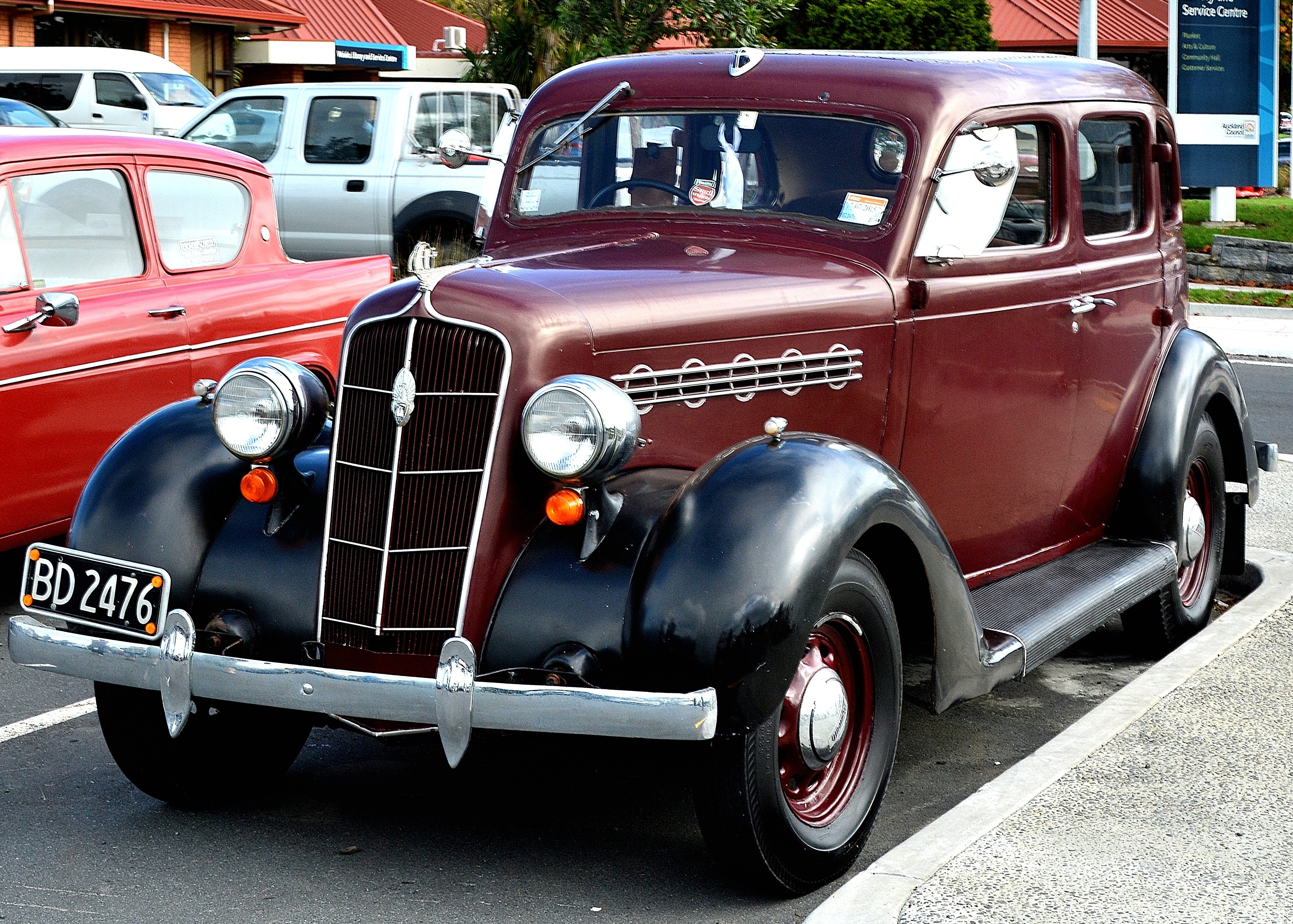
1935 Plymouth Waiuku

Todd Motors developed out of a Ford agency held by their small Otago stock and station agency. They later distributed a number of American brands throughout New Zealand. One of them was Maxwell which was bought by Walter Chrysler and given his name. In 1929 Todd set up an assembling [sic] plant in Napier Street, Freemans Bay, Auckland. Modern methods were planned including electric cranes. This Auckland assembly plant was closed and sold in September 1932 to J Gadsden & Co to make four-gallon petrol containers

In 1935 having successfully introduced Russia sourced Europa brand petrol and oil to New Zealand the Todd brothers built a new building and created a small car assembly plant in Petone which gathered more facilities about it as sales rose. There, starting with Fargo trucks and Plymouth cars, Todds assembled Rootes Group's Hillman, (Note: A report in The Times in January 1936 said that Rootes Group had just made the first shipments to Australia of British-built completely knocked down motorcars. The same report adds Rootes have been sending CKD vehicles to New Zealand "for some time". The Times 3 January 1936 page 9) Humber, Commer and Karrier brand vehicles and Chrysler Corporation's Plymouth, Dodge and DeSoto Diplomats from Canada Britain (Chrysler Kew) and Belgium and, from 1963 until 1979, Valiants from Chrysler Australia.

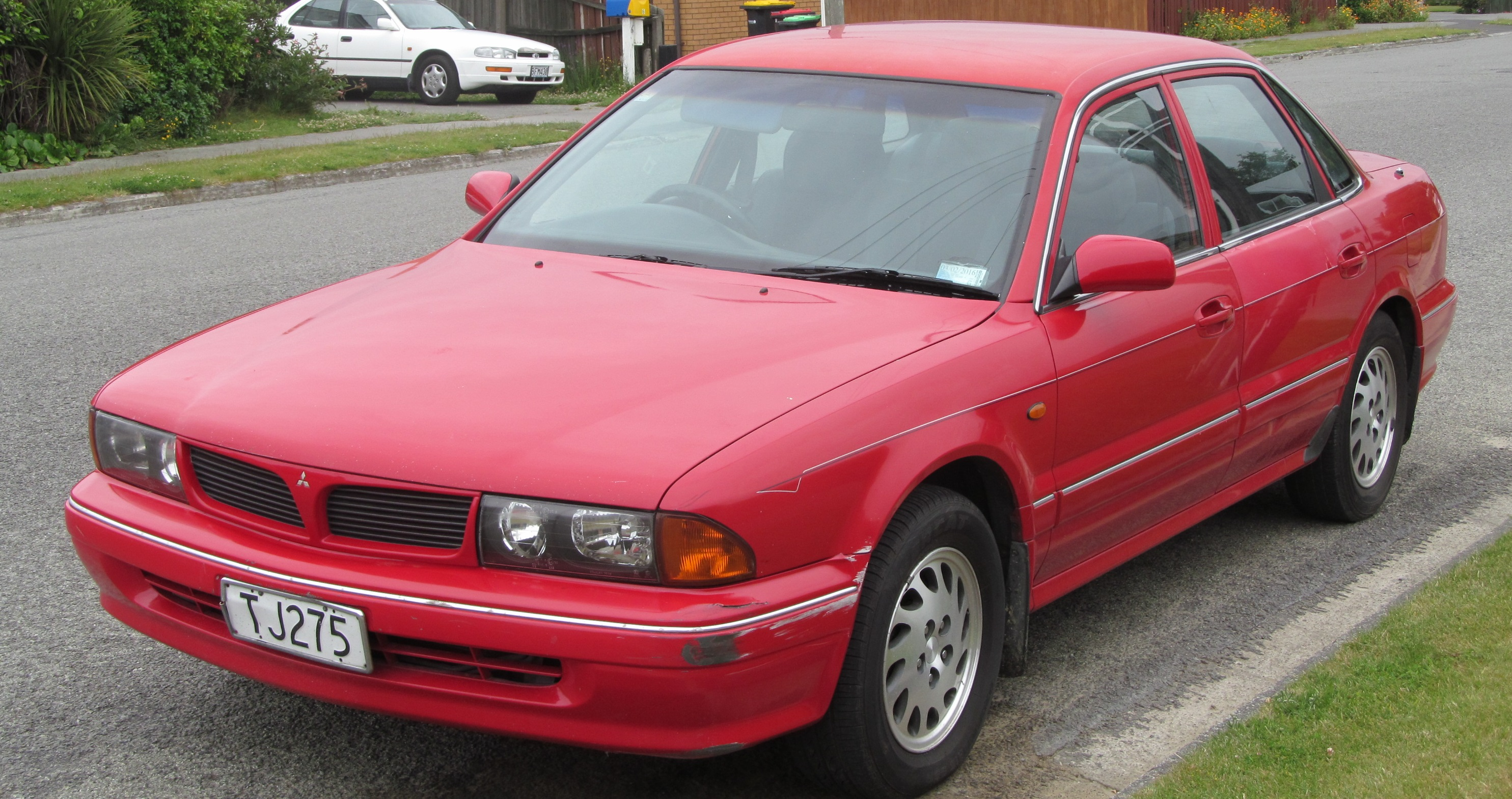
1995 Mitsubishi

The building that became the main Petone factory building had been a Railway Workshop until New Zealand Railways' new Woburn workshops were built. Situated opposite Austin on McKenzie Street later known as the Western Hutt Road now a part of the Hutt Expressway the old factory became an indoor sports hall until it was removed in 2013. The site became a part of the Petone campus of Wellington Institute of Technology and it is used by its School of Construction.

In 1971 Todd acquired New Zealand's Mitsubishi franchise and erected a large capacity purpose-built plant at Porirua which it named Todd Park. The first Mitsubishi vehicles were assembled by Todd Motors in Petone, Fuso heavy trucks followed by Galant 1850 Coupes. In Porirua Todd continued to build Rootes/Chrysler's vehicles for a few years but steadily switched over to Mitsubishi's. Todd Park had begun assembling vehicles in early 1974. Todd Motors’ Porirua plant was sold to Mitsubishi in 1987, the last of the assemblers to be taken over by the parent company. Mitsubishi closed the plant in 1998.

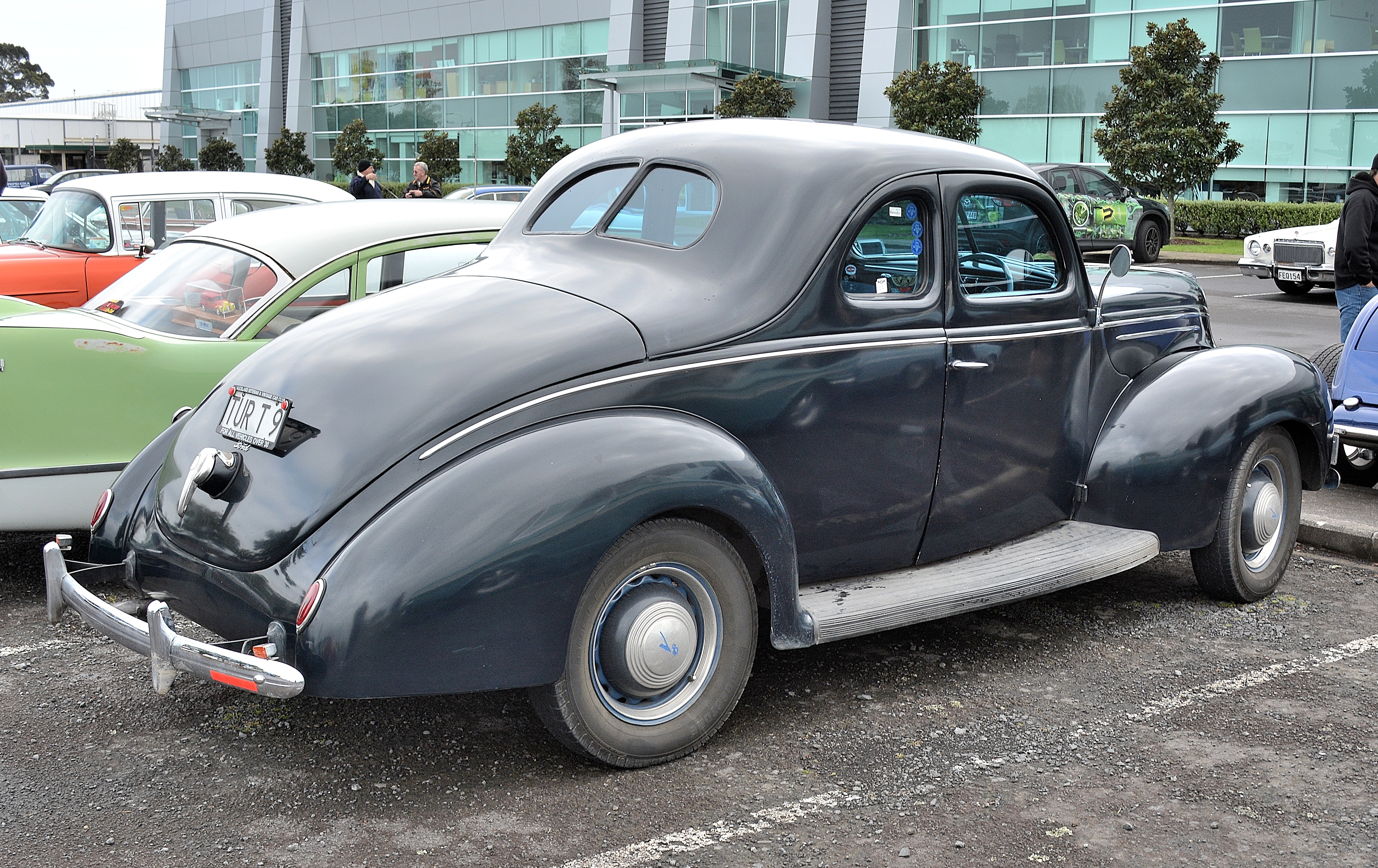
There were special runs of black Ford coupes for traffic officers 1939 V8 coupe Manukau City

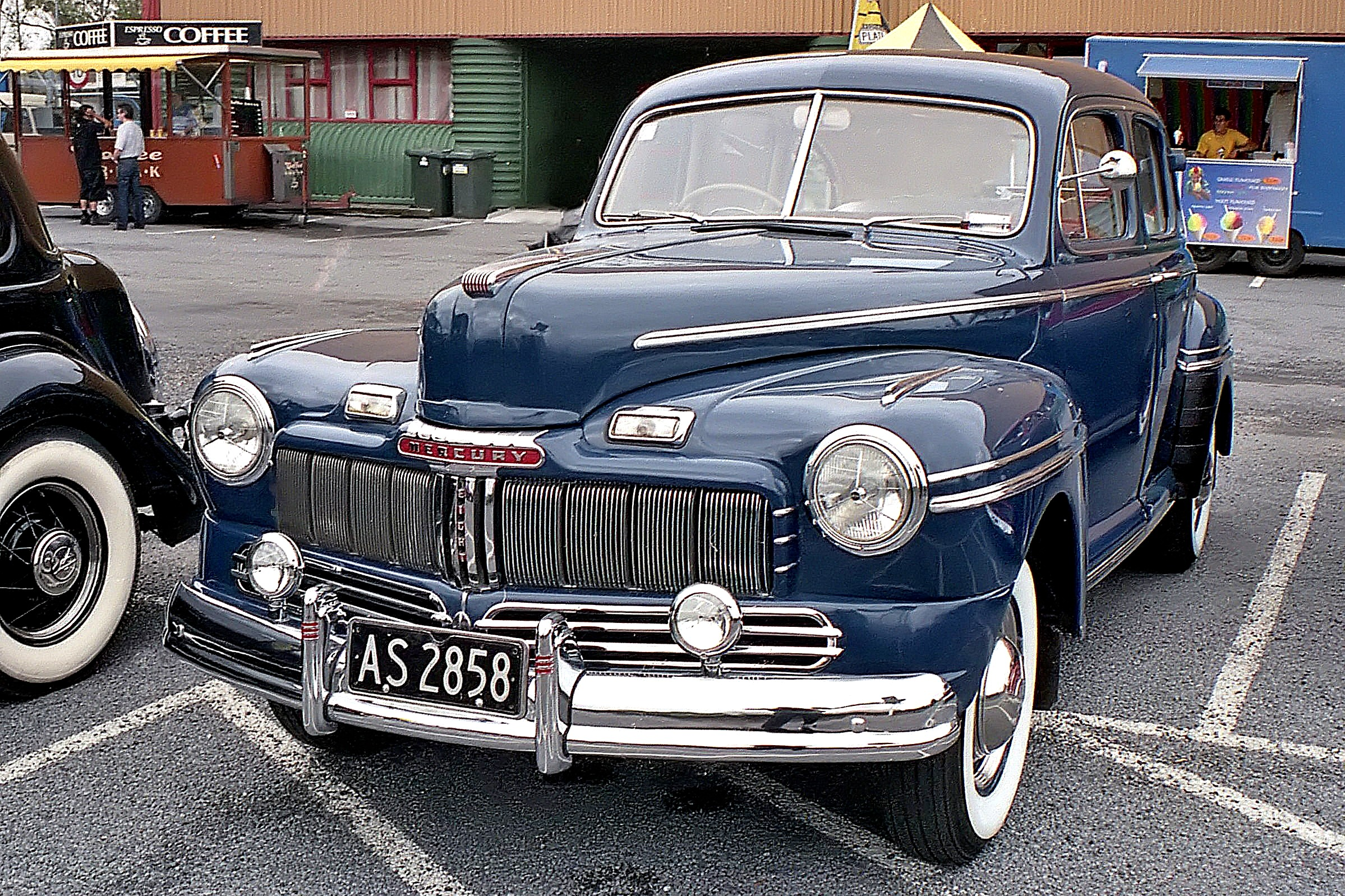
1947 Mercury Western Springs Auckland

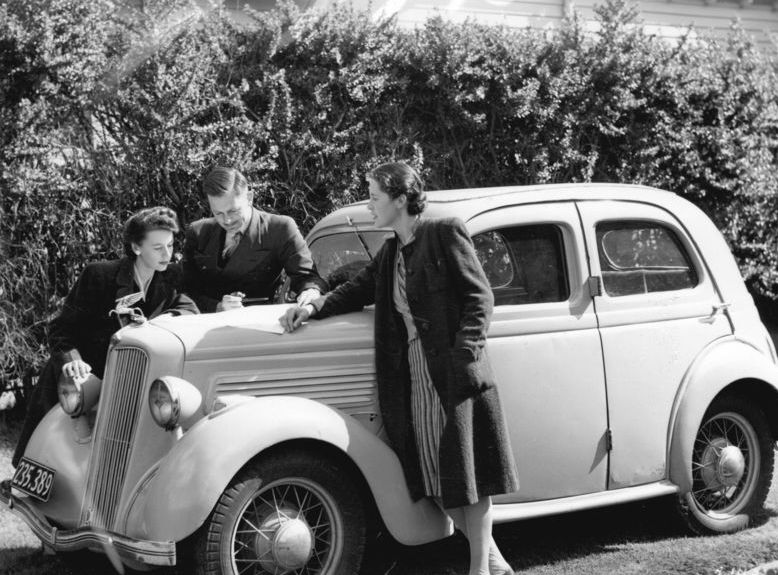
English Ford Model C

=== 1936 Ford Motor Company ===
In late 1935 the Ford Motor Company of Canada announced from Windsor Ontario that construction of a new assembly plant would begin immediately at Wellington and it would be ready to operate on 1 July 1936. Ford New Zealand took over assembly and distribution of its own vehicles at its new factory in Seaview, Lower Hutt. The principal retail operations remained with 'Colonial Motor Co. The Petone factory is now a PlaceMakers Building Supply outlet.

Ford New Zealand opened a new transmission and chassis component plant at Wiri in November 1973. It was intended to supply components for light and medium passenger cars to Australia as well as New Zealand.

Ford and Mazda operated Vehicles Assemblers of New Zealand at Wiri from 1987 to 1997. A 45 minute walkthrough video was made in 1997 and may be viewed on YouTube. Lower Hutt assembly closed in 1988.

=== New Zealand Motor Corporation ===
New Zealand Motor Corporation was a public listed company formed in 1970. It was a combination of the two independent Morris and Austin assemblers Austin Distributors Federation and Dominion Motors. Ownership passed to Honda in the last quarter of the 20th century and its business was renamed Honda New Zealand.

Rationalisation followed the aggregation of all the Austin and Morris plants and by 1985 NZMC was down to two plants: Morrin Road, Panmure in Auckland and Stoke near Nelson. Panmure closed in 1987.

As well as the more popular British Leyland cars, NZMC had assembled a few Jaguar, Rover and Land Rover products and Leyland commercial vehicles at its assembly plant at Stoke. During the 1980s Stoke switched to assembling Japanese Honda vehicles. It closed on 21 August 1998. While primarily producing vehicles for the New Zealand market, some were exported to Australia.

==== 1936 Motor Assemblies ====
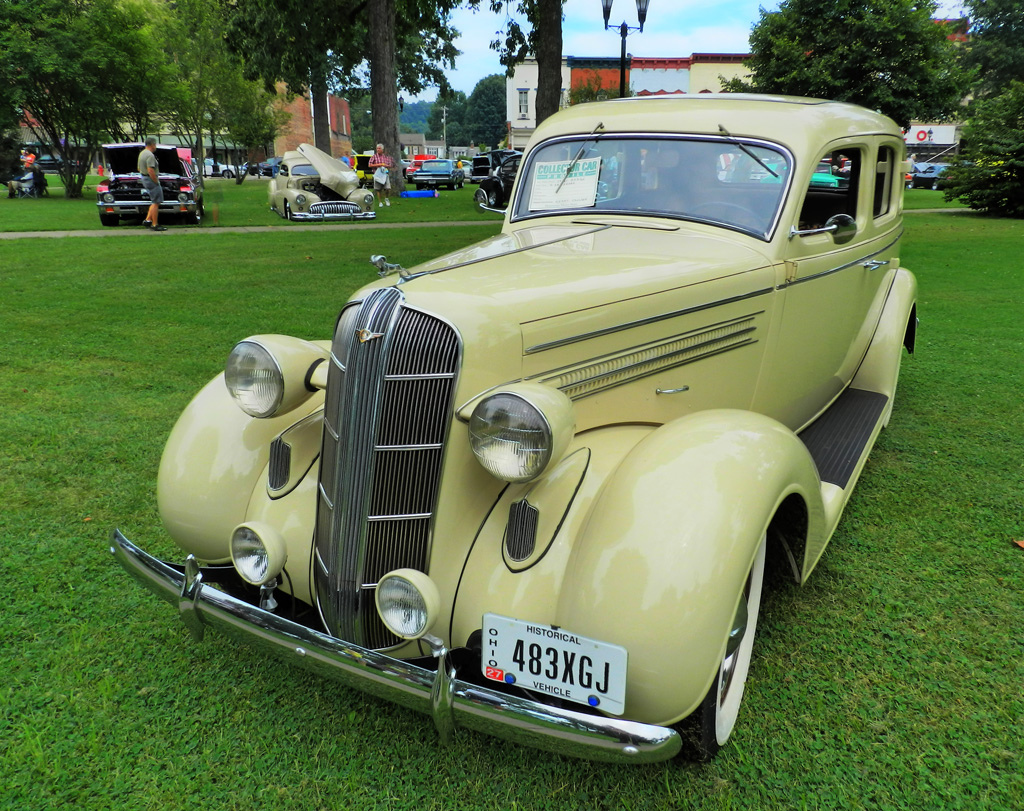
1935 Dodge

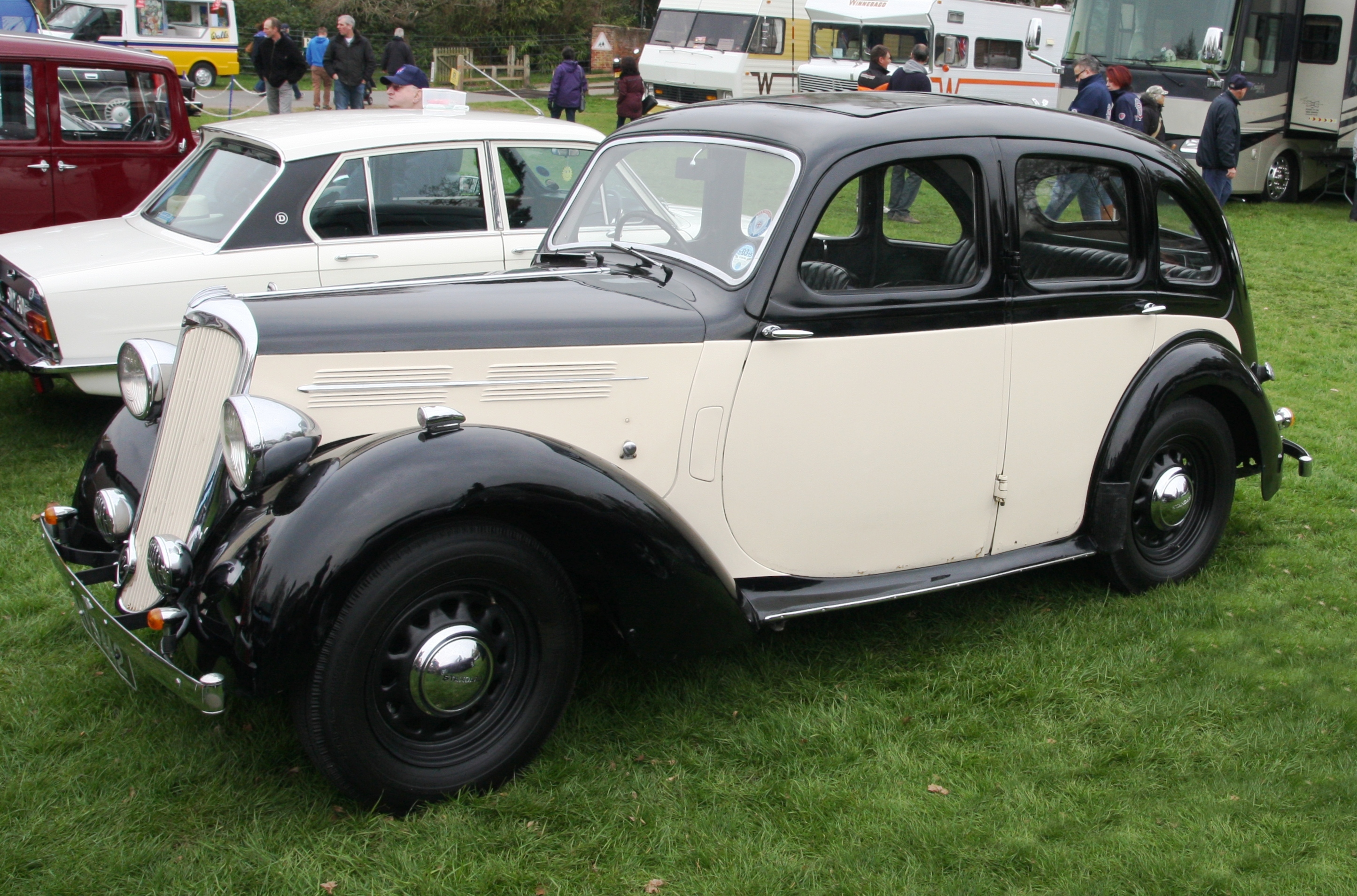
1936 Standard Twelve

South Island retailers Amuri Motors, PH Vickery, Cossens & Black and Boon & Co. (coachbuilders), announced they planned to assemble cars in the St Asaph Street, Christchurch factory of Boon and Co. Dodge and Standard cars would be assembled from CKD packs beginning with Dodge. Motor Assemblies (South Island) Limited was incorporated in June 1935. Each partner held one quarter of the capital. Rover having closed it would have been New Zealand's third assembly plant, the other two being in Wellington but within a month of the announcement of Motor Assemblies' plans Todd, in the presence of the acting prime minister, had opened a plant in Petone.

By December 1936 Dodge display advertisements pointed up the contribution of Motor Assemblies to the New Zealand economy and detailed their many assembly activities in their Christchurch factory. It is difficult to see why a 1.6-litre wood-framed-body Standard Twelve priced at £365 might be preferred by a non-enthusiast to an all-steel six-cylinder 3.6-litre Dodge sedan priced at £389 except on the two scores of (presumed) fuel consumption and parking space.

In 1939 three brands of car were being assembled at St Asaph Street. The purchase of three acres on Ensor's Road, Opawa was announced at the end of July 1939 and it was expected construction of 40,000 square feet of buildings would be complete by the end of the year. The site would include a test track. St Asaph Street premises would then be sold. War was declared just five weeks after that announcement and there appears to be no subsequent record of the Ensor's Road intentions.

A new plant in Tuam Street between Barbados and Madras Streets did begin operations after the war assembling Studebaker and Standard cars. In 1954 it was acquired by Standard-Triumph International.

Christchurch production stopped 24 August 1965 and all its plant and machinery was moved more than 400 kilometres to Nelson and into a never-used 100,000 square foot building on a 27 acres site intended for a cotton mill but abandoned in mid 1962.

STI was bought by Leyland Motors in 1960 and ultimately the Nelson operation became part of British Leyland in 1968. By then owned by Honda New Zealand this plant closed in August 1998.

==== 1937 Seabrook Fowlds ====
Distributors of Austins in Auckland Province and Taranaki, Seabrook Fowlds, announced in the winter of 1936 that to comply with the new tariff regulations for imported vehicles they would build "an assembly factory" in Auckland to supply Austins to these areas. Situated behind the timber yards at the corner of Great South Road and Manukau Road, Newmarket on a boundary with Epsom's residential area it would be a single storey building with two brick and two iron walls and its paint shop would have an air conditioning plant to absorb paint vapour. Previously there had been a small facility in Parnell in St George's Bay Road.

In the new Newmarket plant the body shell was removed from the wooden case of its export packaging which also held its matching chassis and pre-assembled engine, gearbox and back axle units. The body was painted and trimmed and seats and upholstery added, wiring completed then the whole reunited with the newly assembled chassis and its mechanicals. There were 54 office and works staff at the new factory and its output was expected to be 20 cars each week.

At the end of the war this small plant became the Austin truck assembly factory.

==== 1939 Austin South Island ====
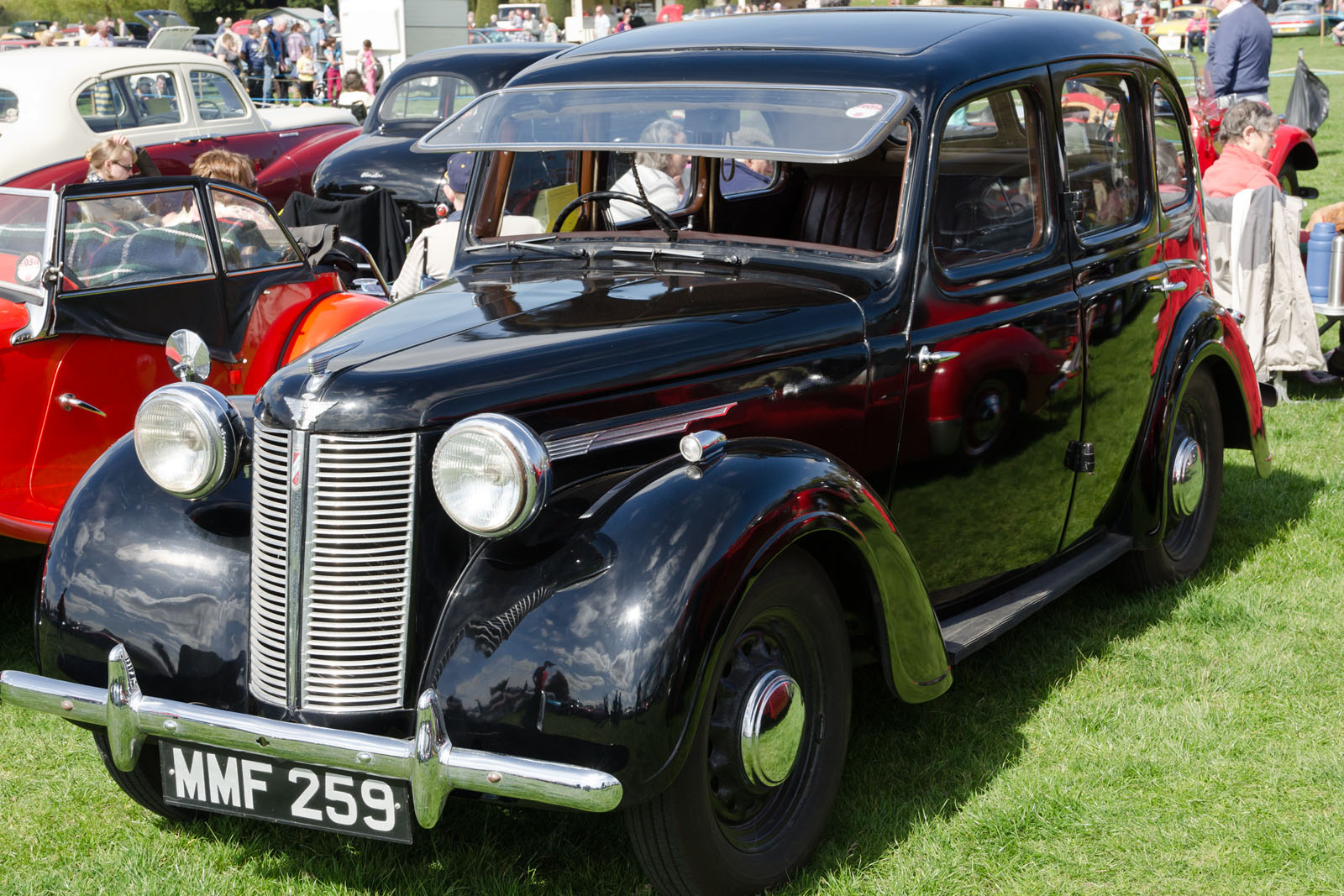
Austin Ten 1946

David Crozier Limited had been running two small assembly plants for some years. In March 1939 a consortium of South Island dealers announced a new assembly plant would be built in Christchurch on a six and a half acre block beside the Christchurch-Lyttelton railway line. It was expected the new business would require a staff of 125 people and it was expected to open in July 1939.

Austin Motor Industries Limited, the company which would own the business was incorporated 25 May 1939. Shareholders' (Note: Shareholders: David Crozier Limited, Christchurch; D Clive Crozier, Christchurch; P H Vickery, Invercargill; John Black, Dunedin; Boon Investment company, Christchurch (coachbuilders)) businesses were in Christchurch, Dunedin and Invercargill. Vickery Black and Boon were involved with Motor Assemblies (see above) which contracted assembly to Boon and Company.

==== 1926 Dominion Motors ====
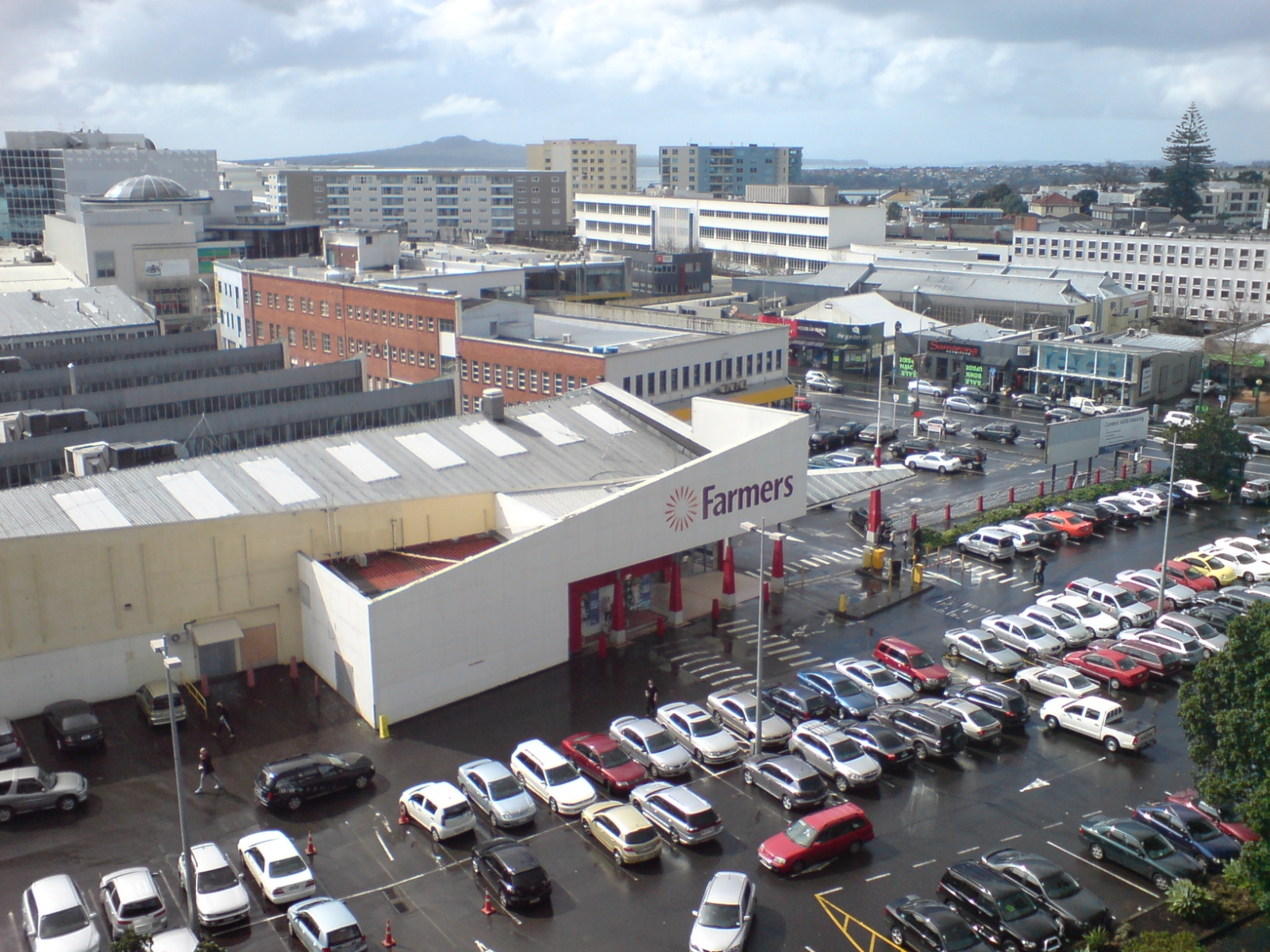
Mortimer Pass plant (demolished 2017) as a Farmers department store, Nuffield Street in the middle distance

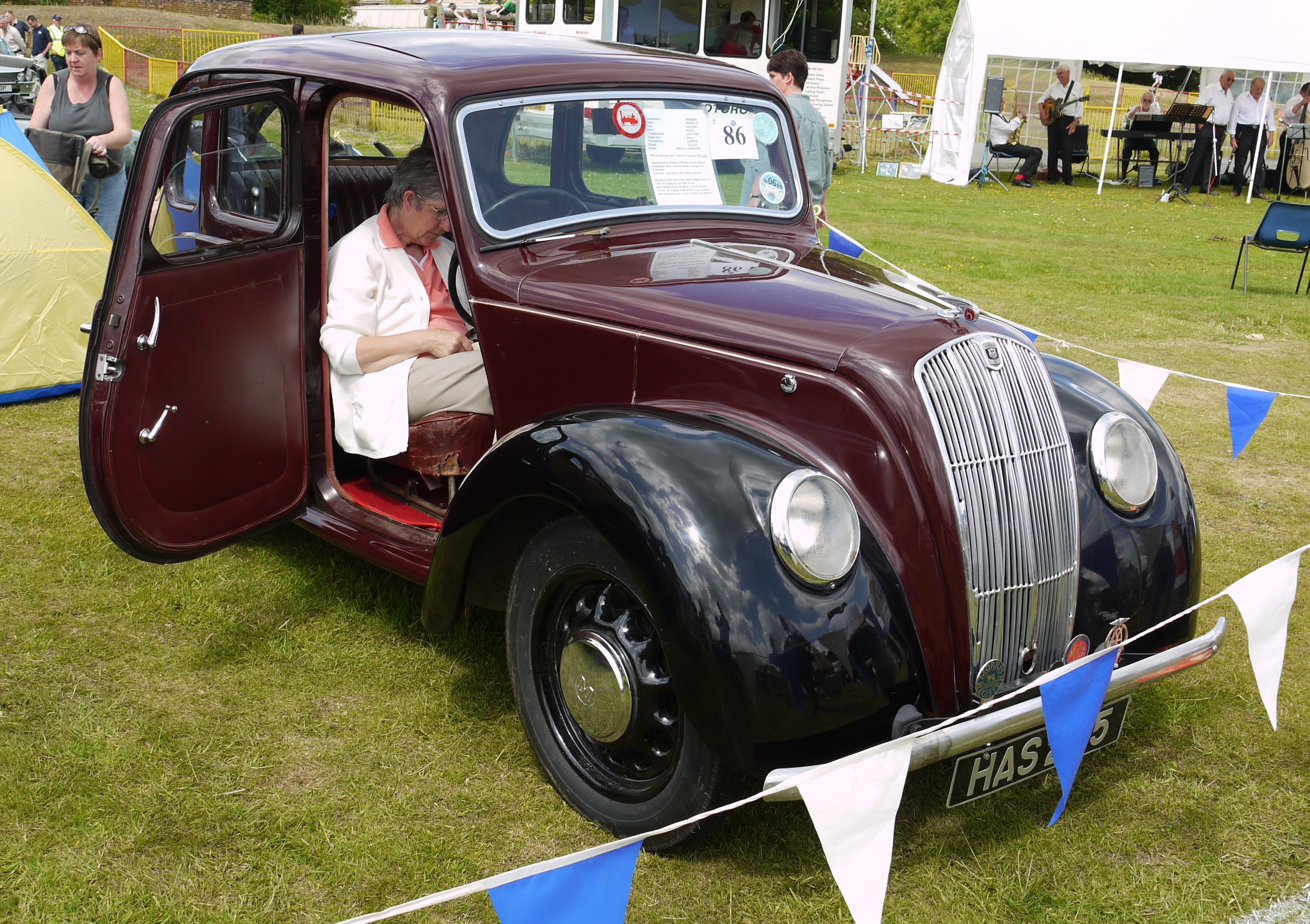
Morris Eight

Wellington's Dominion Motors business began in 1912 with wholesale distribution of imported vehicles. In 1919 it amalgamated with a Christchurch business, J A Redpath's Universal Motor Co, and opened new retail departments in Christchurch as well as in Wellington. Distributorships included Oldsmobile, Crossley, Chevrolet, Stutz, Rolls-Royce, Hudson and Essex and Vauxhall.

For the first nine months of 1927 Essex would become the third most popular car brand in New Zealand, behind Chevrolet in second place, and Ford in first place. Combined with parent company Hudson's sales for 1927 the two brands together actually trumped Chevrolet for second place. (Note: Cars sold January to September 1927 1651 Ford 1100 Chevrolet 898 Essex (Hudson) 486 Dodge 471 Chrysler 379 Buick 359 Overland Whippet 297 Rugby 252 Studebaker 206 Hudson P- 165 Oldsmobile 157 Nash 132 Willys-Knight 108 Hupmobile 105 Oakland 92 Pontiac 62 Erskine 47 Paige 27 Cadillac P + 22 Packard P + 19 Chandler 9 Reo 8 Velie 8 Flint: 7066 North American 80 per cent; 182 Fiat 6 Ansaldo 37 Citroen 257 "Other": 482 European and other 5 per cent; 449 Morris 387 Austin 78 Clyno 77 Singer 67 Standard 63 Crossley P + 55 Rover P - 40 Armstrong-Siddeley P + 33 Humber P + 19 Sunbeam P + 17 Bean 13 Talbot P + 10 Hillman 9 Vauxhall 9 Wolseley 8 Swift 5 Star 1 Arrol Johnson P +: 1340 United Kingdom 15 per cent; P = expensive prestige cars)

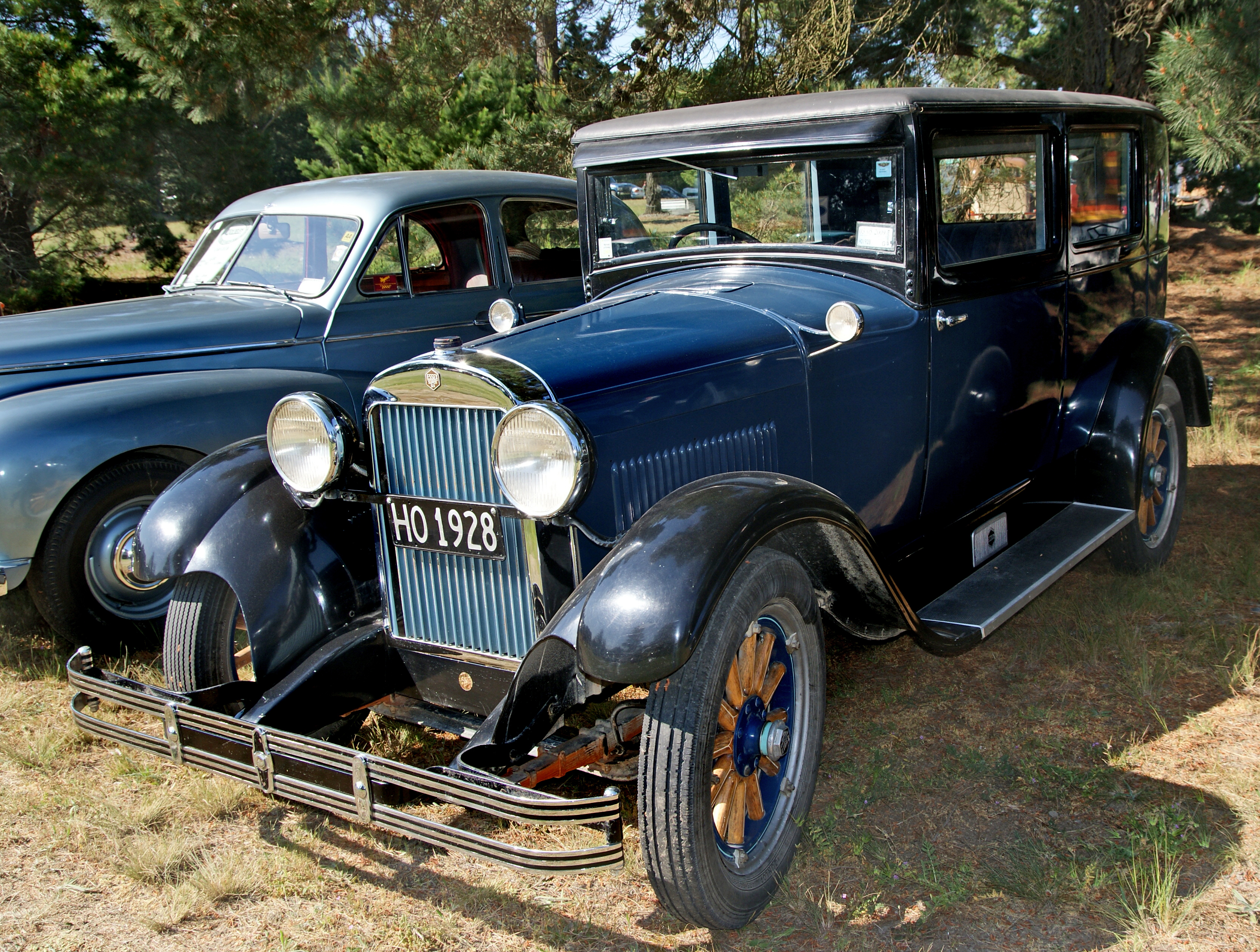
1927 Essex Super Six, the third most popular car in New Zealand in 1927

Auckland operations were run from premises at 166 Albert Street (formerly Gillett Motors, Buick dealers, absorbed March 1926) where there was one of a number of small workshops run in the main centres by Dominion Motors that finished assembly of partly knocked down cars. In 1928 the 161 Albert Street "assembly line" took one hour to assemble each new car.

Just before Christmas 1930 Morris Motors Limited announced the appointment of Dominion Motors to control the distribution of Morris cars and commercial vehicles in New Zealand They took over Morris's Auckland Province retailing from long established Harrison & Gash, originally coachbuilders, who had their showroom at 175 Albert Street and carried out servicing at the foot of Khyber Pass in Newmarket.

In 1938 it built in Mortimer Pass Newmarket a real assembly plant on 1 1/2 acres of bare land beside Highwic bought from the Buckland estate. The building was completed at the end of February 1939 when it was expected the necessary plant would be installed by the middle of the year. The new plant would turn out 10 vehicles a day at the Mortimer Pass frontage. War was declared on 3 September 1939 but the plant was opened and began production. By the start of the 1950s it employed more than 600 people. A new extra plant was built in Panmure in 1953. Opened in 1954 it continued to grow until 1961 and built Morris Minor commercial models until 1975.

Production was transferred from Mortimer Pass and Nuffield Street to Panmure in 1978.

Panmure closed 1987.

A new factory for the assembly of Rolls-Royce industrial equipment was built in Panmure in 1960

=== General Motors New Zealand ===
General Motors New Zealand (GMNZ) started out assembling North American General Motors vehicles 1926, often from Canada as those plants were set up to produce cars with right-hand drive. They later added Vauxhall cars as well, but in the 1950s they started a switch over to assembling mainly Holdens. In the 1980s, GMNZ also assembled some Isuzus and Suzukis sold with GM badging. Local assembly ended in 1990 after trade liberalisation; GM announced a withdrawal from all right-hand drive markets in 2020 but were, as of 2023, still selling certain Chevrolets in RHD markets, including New Zealand.

== World War II ==
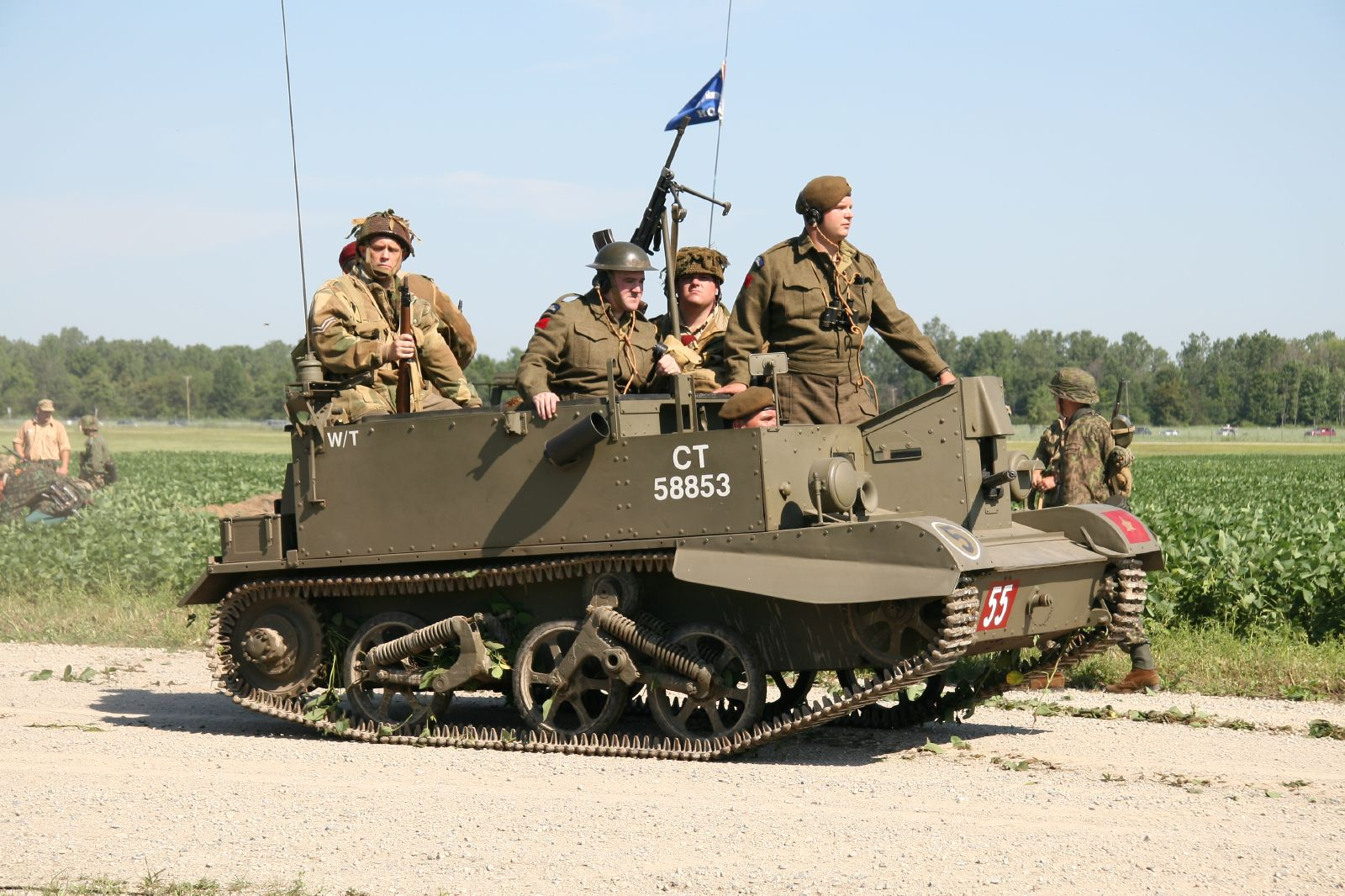
Universal Carrier Thunder over Michigan 2006

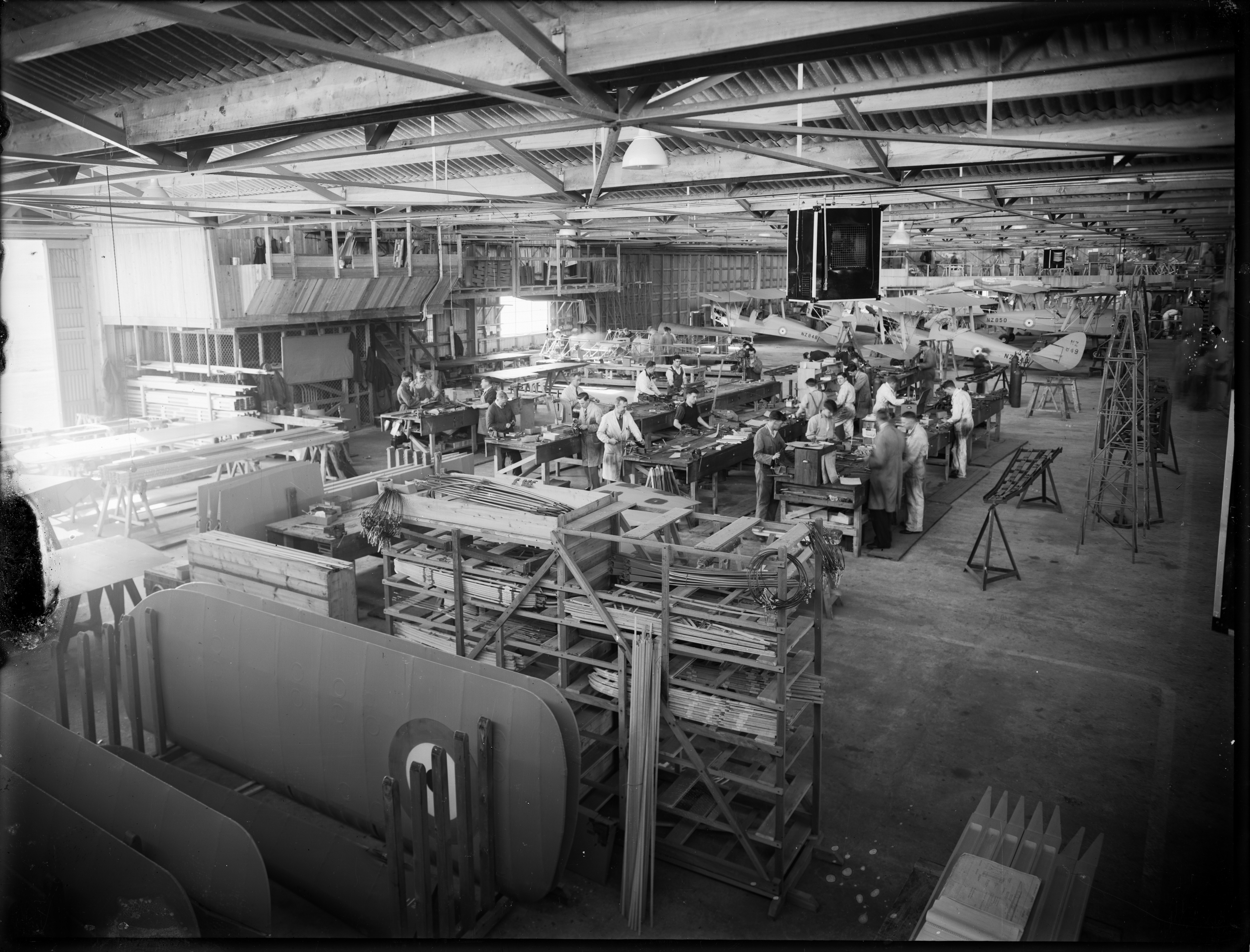
De Havilland factory Rongotai later Wellington Airport terminal

During World War II General Motors Petone built 1,200 Universal Carriers also known as Bren Gun carriers, sub-contracts for parts were spread throughout the country. Other light-armoured vehicles, mortars, shells, grenades, anti-tank mines and Tommy guns were made too. Joining them were aircraft frames and parts and the assembly of light tanks and aircraft. The nation's 9,600 tractors in use in 1939 reached over 18,900 by 1946. Until the 1980s Wellington's main airport building was a wartime De Havilland aircraft factory.

US forces sent to Wellington worn out or badly damaged heavy trucks and jeeps from war service in the Pacific Islands. Reclamation was carried out in the Hutt Valley by Ford - jeeps, General Motors - heavy trucks and Todd Motors - weapons carriers. Each truck went back with a jeep on its tray

In the four years leading up to the outbreak of war the national car fleet had bounced back by 42 percent from its depression-starved level and New Zealand was second only to the United States in cars per head. Petrol rationing came into force on 5 September 1939 and lasted until 31 May 1950 with just 17 months respite in 1946–1947. The volume for private car owners was eased or constricted as the nation's circumstances permitted partly because tankers on a run to New Zealand were unavailable for a long time and in any case the government welcomed reduced foreign currency payments. By mid-1942 a rubber shortage put tyres in very short supply, Japan had captured most of the plantations. A motor trade journal pointed out that with the standard private petrol ration and the usual mileage from new tyres a set of tyres would last 36 years. Newspapers suspecting cheating on petrol supplies threatened to track cars from remote places at well-attended race meetings. It became necessary to obtain a licence to buy gumboots and hotwater bottles.

The United States Navy's mid-1942 success in the Battle of the Coral Sea removed the threat of Japanese invasion.

== No-remittance licences ==
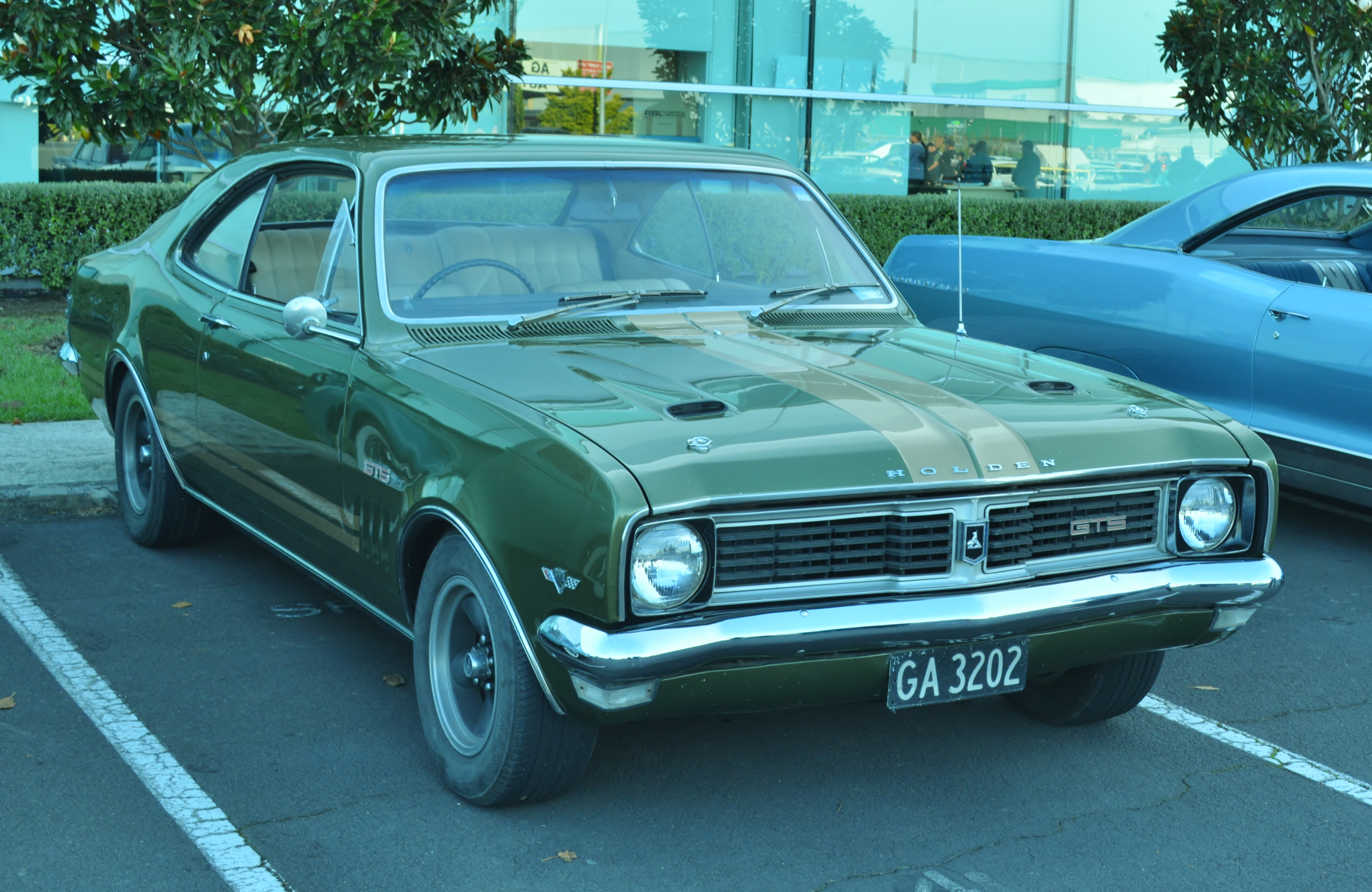
Holden Monaro GTS V8 no-remittance licence only

From May 1950 buyers could dodge the apparently endless queues for a new car by using "overseas funds". They could even import cars for which no import licence would ever be provided. In essence the buyer would pay for the overseas content of the car from a source beyond the control of New Zealand's manifold foreign currency restrictions. The balance of dealer overheads, duty and sales tax was paid in local currency when the vehicle was delivered. If the vehicle were locally assembled the "overseas funds" requirement was much lower. Until late in the scheme "Overseas funds" were not difficult to obtain or "create". Most New Zealanders disliked the necessary deviousness.

It seems to have been seen as a valuable safety valve and guide to the shape of a free market. Holden dealers even incorporated the statistics in their advertising. (Note: >No-remittance sales January to April 1964: 959 = 34 per cent — Holden*; 243 = 9 per cent — Morris 1100; 198 = 7.3 per cent — Ford Cortina; 170 = 6.3 per cent — Austin 1100; 167 = 6.3 per cent — Vauxhall Victor; 146 = 5.4 per cent — Vauxhall Viva; 120 = 4.4 per cent — MG; 104 = 3.8 per cent — Chrysler Valiant*; 87 = 3.2 per cent — Ford Zephyr 6; 82 = 3.0 per cent — Vauxhall Velox; 50 = 1.9 per cent — Morris Mini; 50 = 1.9 per cent — Austin Mini; 49 = 1.8 per cent — Ford Anglia; 49 = 1.8 per cent — Ford Falcon*; 248 = 9.3 per cent others; * = Australia)

The scheme seems to have lasted more than thirty years. (Note: No remittance imports year quantity 1955 1,998 1956 2,321 1957 1,427 1958 2,409 1959 2,527 1960 3,981 1961 7,727 1962 6,584 1963 11,426 1964 12,606 1965 14,121 1966 14,426 1967 14,928 1968 10,286 1969 9,035)

== Assembly plants continued ==
=== 1946 Austin Distributors Federation ===
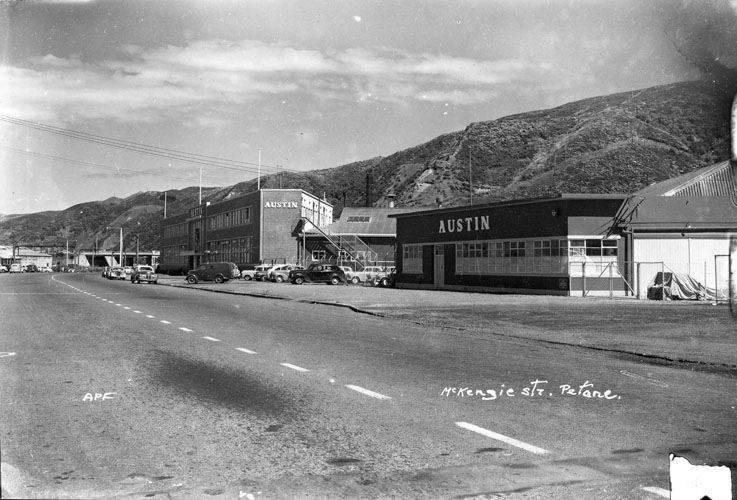
Austin plant, Petone 1950s

Austin agent George H. Scott became New Zealand's official Austin factory representative in 1919. He formed the Austin Distributor Federation.

==== 1946 Associated Motor Industries and Austin Distributors Federation ====
Two new companies were incorporated in August 1945 Associated Motor Industries and Austin Distributors Federation both of Wellington. (Note: They had the same shareholders holding the same share of the capital of each company 28 per cent —Wellington—Magnus Motors 6 per cent —Dunedin—Austin Motors (Otago) 14 per cent —Christchurch—David Crozier 6 per cent —Invercargill—P. H. Vickery 8 per cent —Hāwera —Farmers' Co-op. Org. Soc. 6 per cent —Napier— Aorangi 32 per cent —Auckland —Seabrook, Fowlds: Objects: Manufacturers, dealers, repairers, etc., of motor-cars, motor vehicles, aeroplanes, and incidental.) The Petone plant, situated on McKenzie street across the road from the Todd Motors plant, closed in May 1983. After various uses including a paintball arena and a car dealership the building was demolished in 2015

=== 1958 Motor Holdings ===
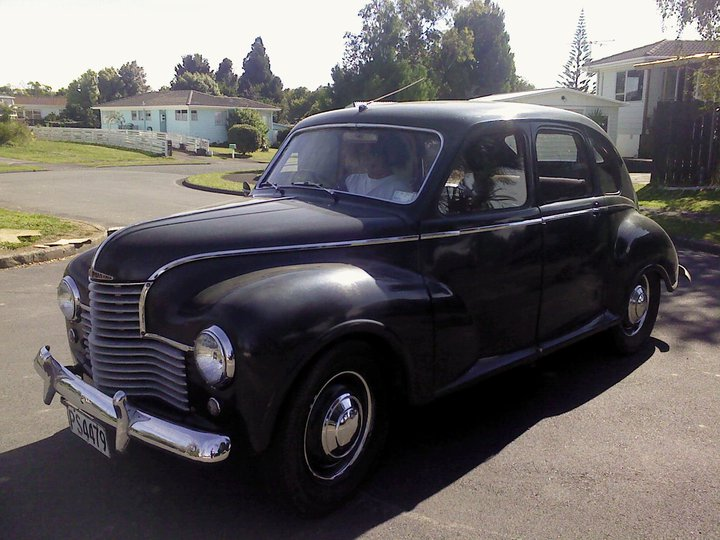
Jowett Javelin

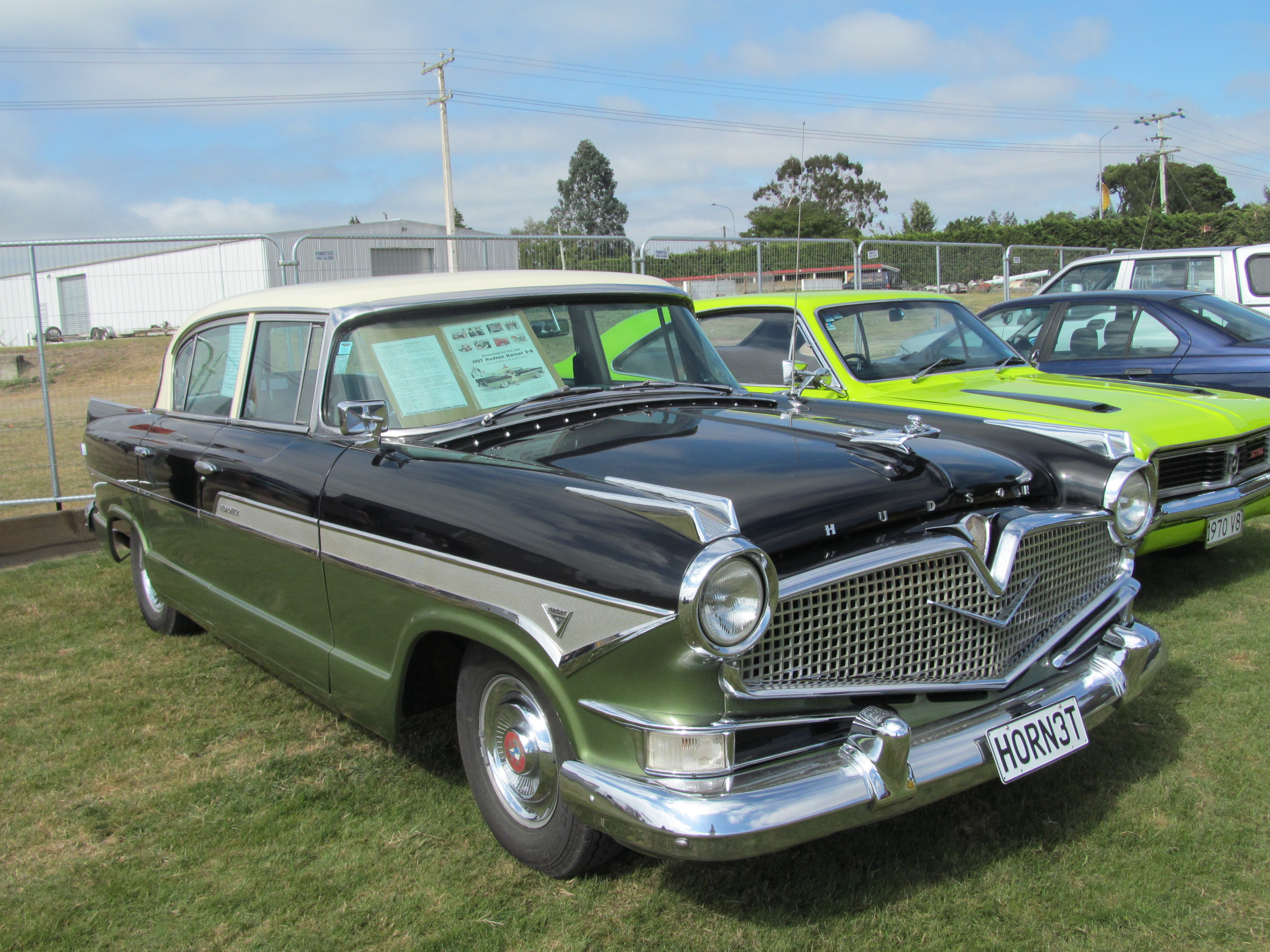
1957 Hudson Hornet sedan

Motor Holdings was founded in 1936 and developed from the New Zealand franchise of Jowett Motors. The New Zealand franchise imported and assembled Jowett Bradford very light vans and trucks in Auckland. Motor Holdings controlled 15 smaller companies including a new assembly company called Motor Industries International. Following Jowett's 1954 closure Motor Holdings won the Volkswagen franchise and changed the name of its Auckland operation to VW Motors. VW Motors built a new assembly plant which opened in 1958 at Fort Richard Road in Otahuhu. Rambler vehicles by American Motors Corporation were built at the VW plant as a secondary line to Volkswagen until 1962.

Motor Holdings assembled many different makes in addition to Volkswagen including Studebaker, Nash and Hudson in the 1950s; Rambler, Peugeot 403 and 404 in the early 1960s; and Datsun, Simca, Skoda, the Fiat 500 (christened "Fiat Bambina" in New Zealand in 1965), and the New Zealand-made Trekka through the 1960s and 1970s.

European Motor Distributors was formed by Colin Giltrap in 1978, and continued to assemble Volkswagens until 1986.

The Otahuhu plant built around 127,000 vehicles before it was sold to Mazda and its last vehicle was a Mazda utility made in 1987. The empty plant remained untouched since that time when visited by the former CEO of Motor Holdings with a writer in late 2018, 30 years later.

=== 1964 Steel Brothers ===
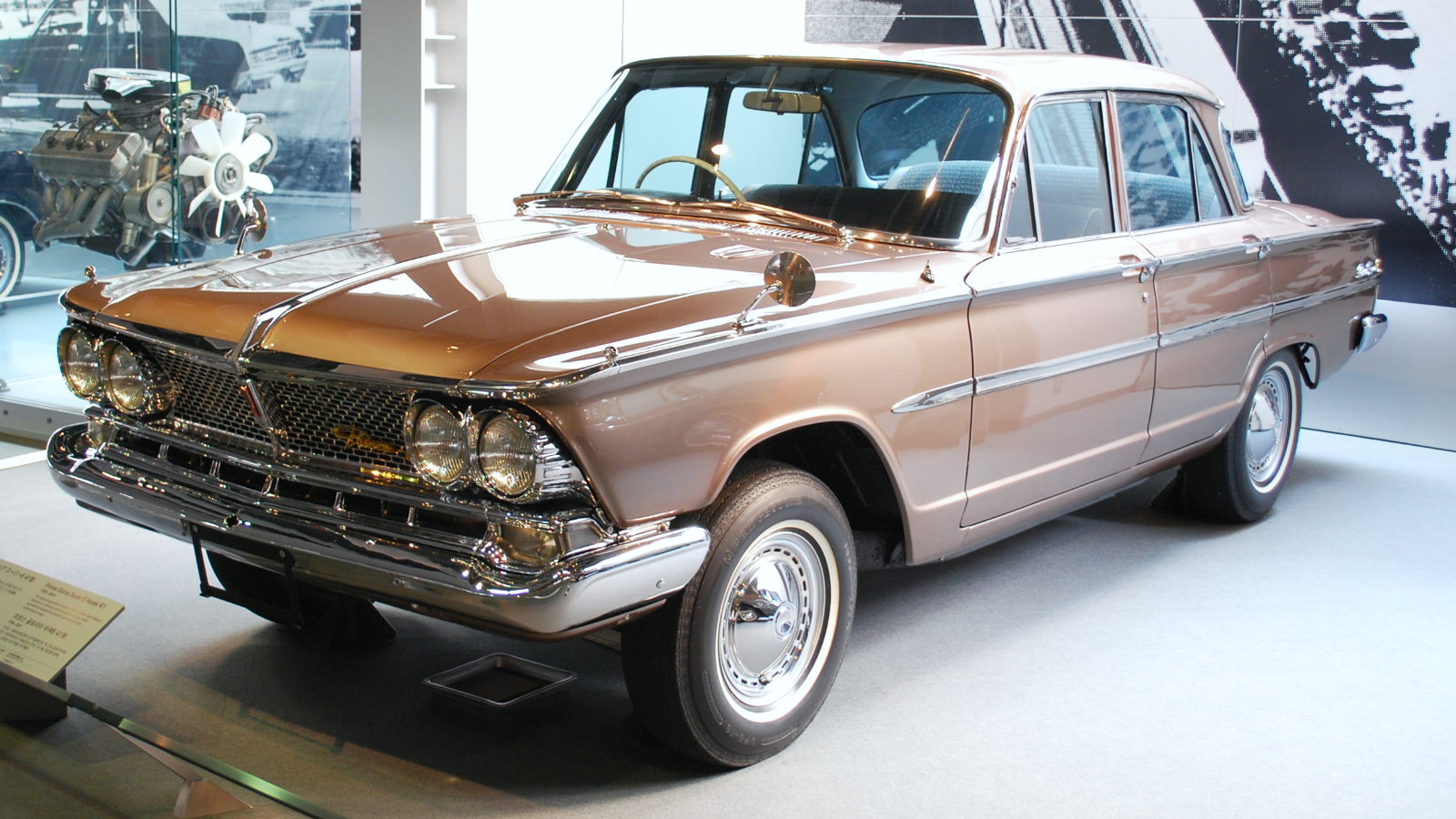
Prince Gloria

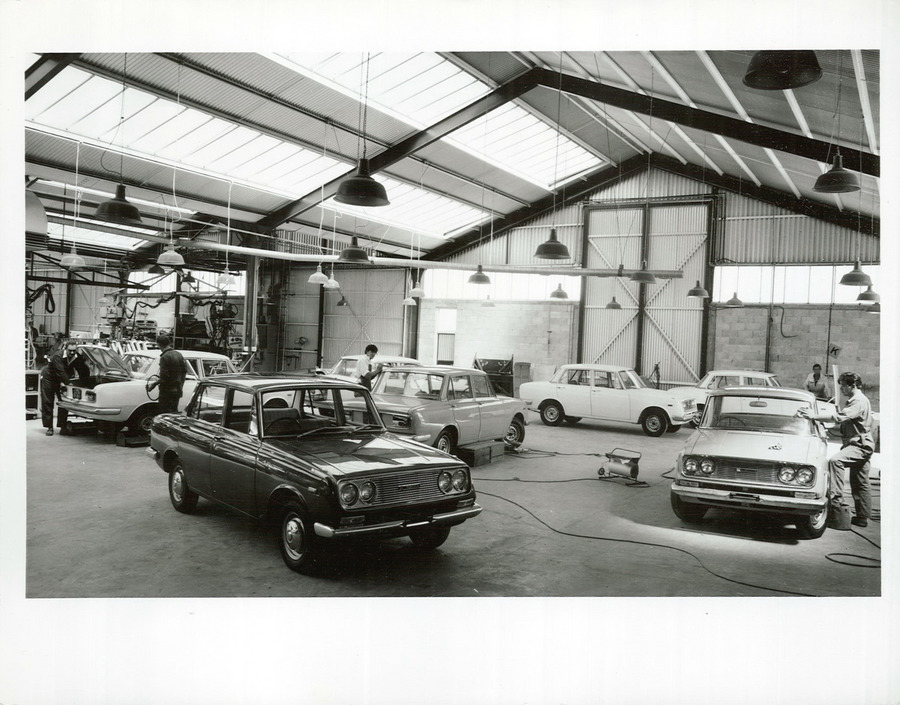
Finishing new Toyotas, 1967

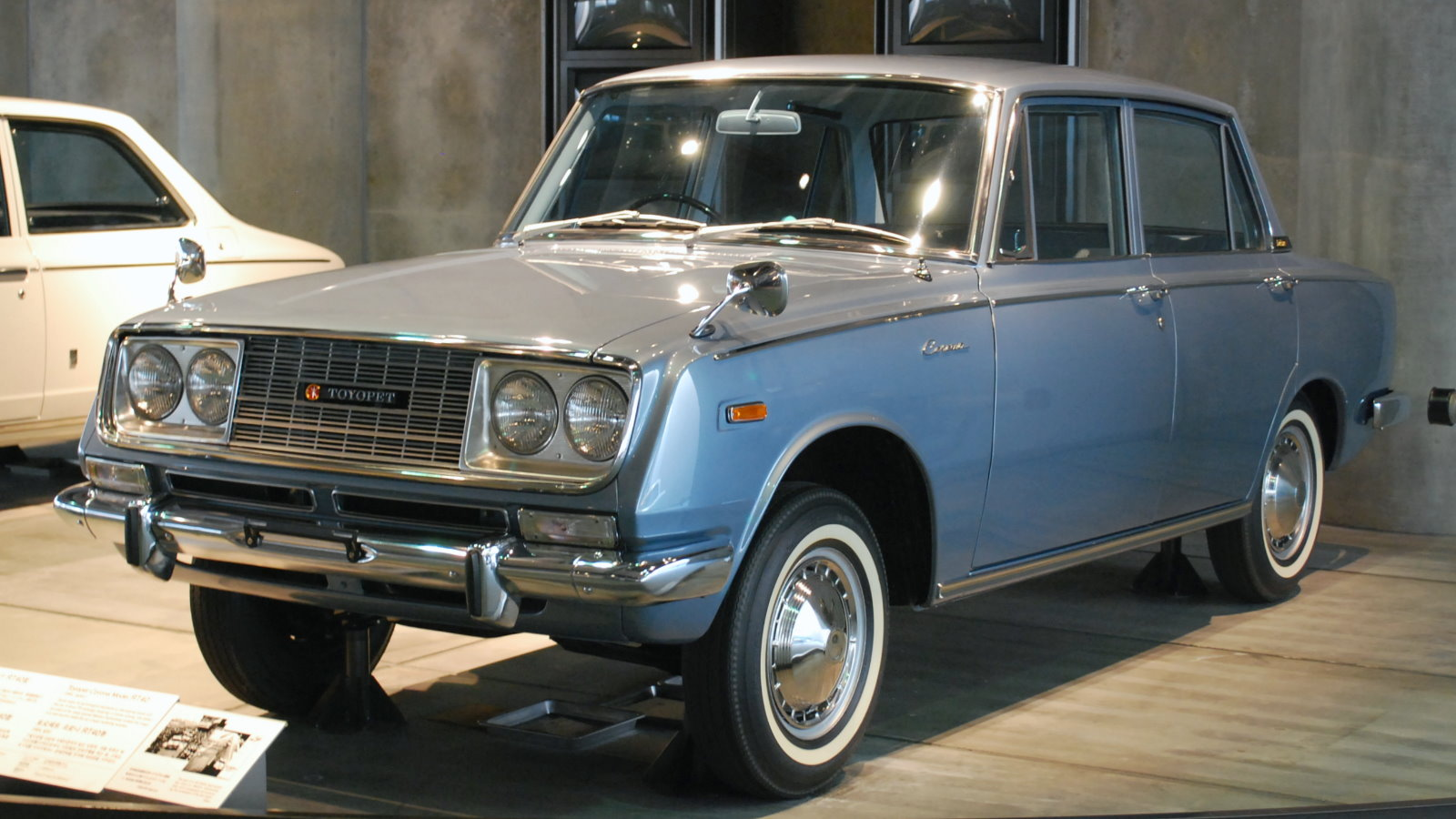
Toyota Corona T40

Toyota New Zealand Christchurch

'Steelbro began making commercial motor vehicle coachwork in the early 1900s. They were among the first to assemble Japanese cars in New Zealand. In 1964 Steebro incorporated Steel Motor Assemblies and began assembling Prince Glorias. They followed with more Datsuns and added Mazdas.

In February 1967 they began to put together the first New Zealand assembled Toyotas, Toyota Corona T40 and T50 cars for Consolidated Motor Industries which owned the New Zealand Toyota franchise. Consolidated Motor Industries was a partnership of Mercedes-Benz importers Cable Price Downer (Note: itself an alliance of Wellington heavy engineers William Cable & Company; Thames founders, heavy engineers and locomotive and shipbuilders A&G Price and Wellington tunnellers and civil engineers Downer & Co) with Challenge Corporation (Note: which had inherited dealerships throughout the country from its stock and station agency operations) renamed in November 1970 as Consolidated Motor Distributors.

Manufacturers like Toyota were unable to establish their own assembly plants because New Zealand's import licensing system granted licences by marque to existing franchise holders. So Toyota was obliged to buy the licence holders.

In February 1977 Toyota acquired from Challenge a 20 percent stake in Consolidated Motor Distributors, which now controlled Campbell Motor Industries in Thames, and in May 1979 CMD was renamed Toyota New Zealand. Purchase from the New Zealand shareholders was completed in June 1992. Toyota also acquired Steel Motor Assemblies and renamed it Toyota New Zealand Christchurch.

Steel Brothers also made and exported Lotus Seven sports cars from 1973 to 1979. Prototypes of a replacement car were made but did not enter production.

Though changes of regulations had begun in 1978 New Zealand's long-distance internal transport system was transformed in 1983 when New Zealand Railways Corporation' long-haul freight monopoly was removed. Steelbro having built more than 5,000 truck cabs and bodies in the previous ten years elected to concentrate on trailers and semi-trailers.

=== 1964 Campbell Motor Industries ===
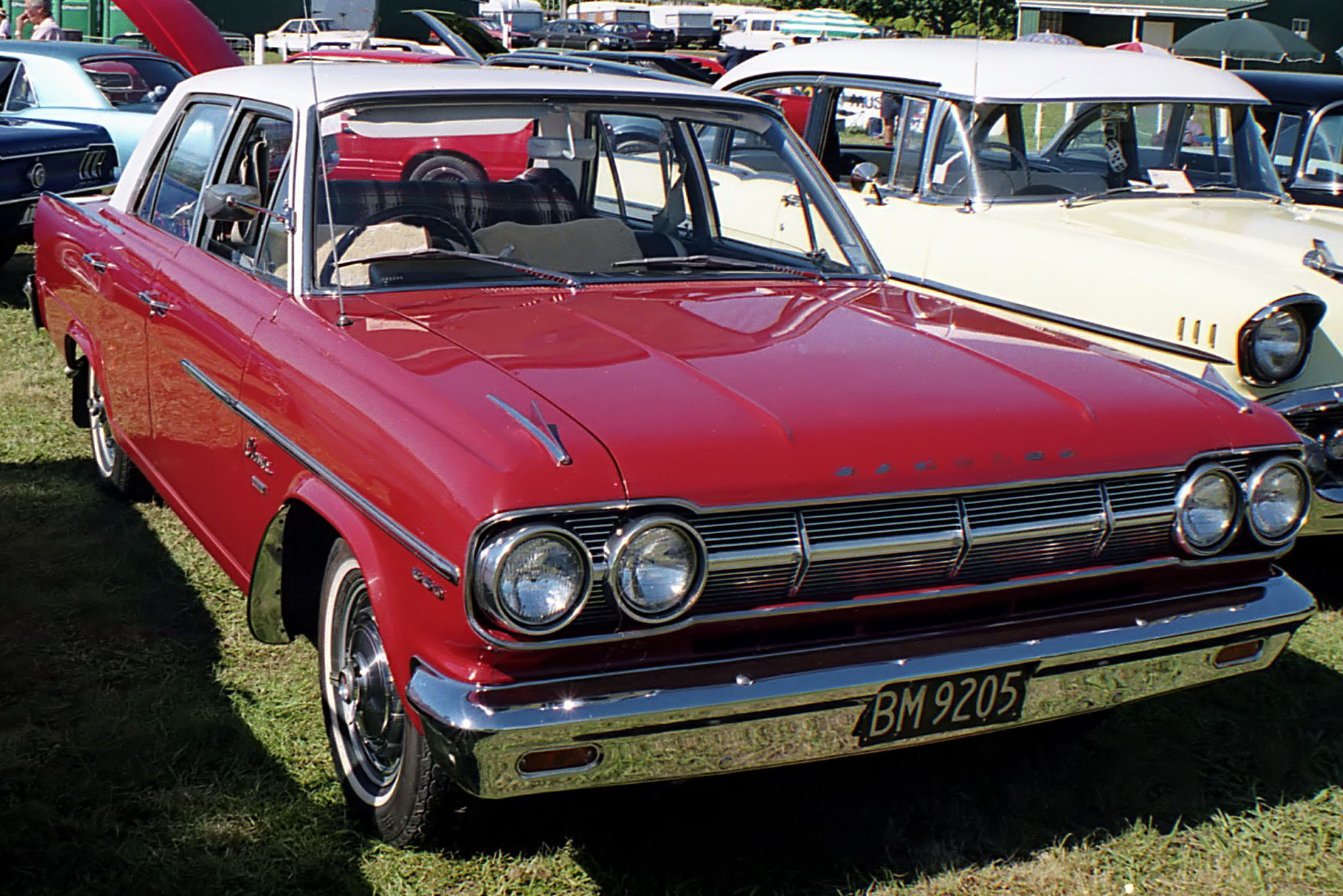
1965 Rambler 660

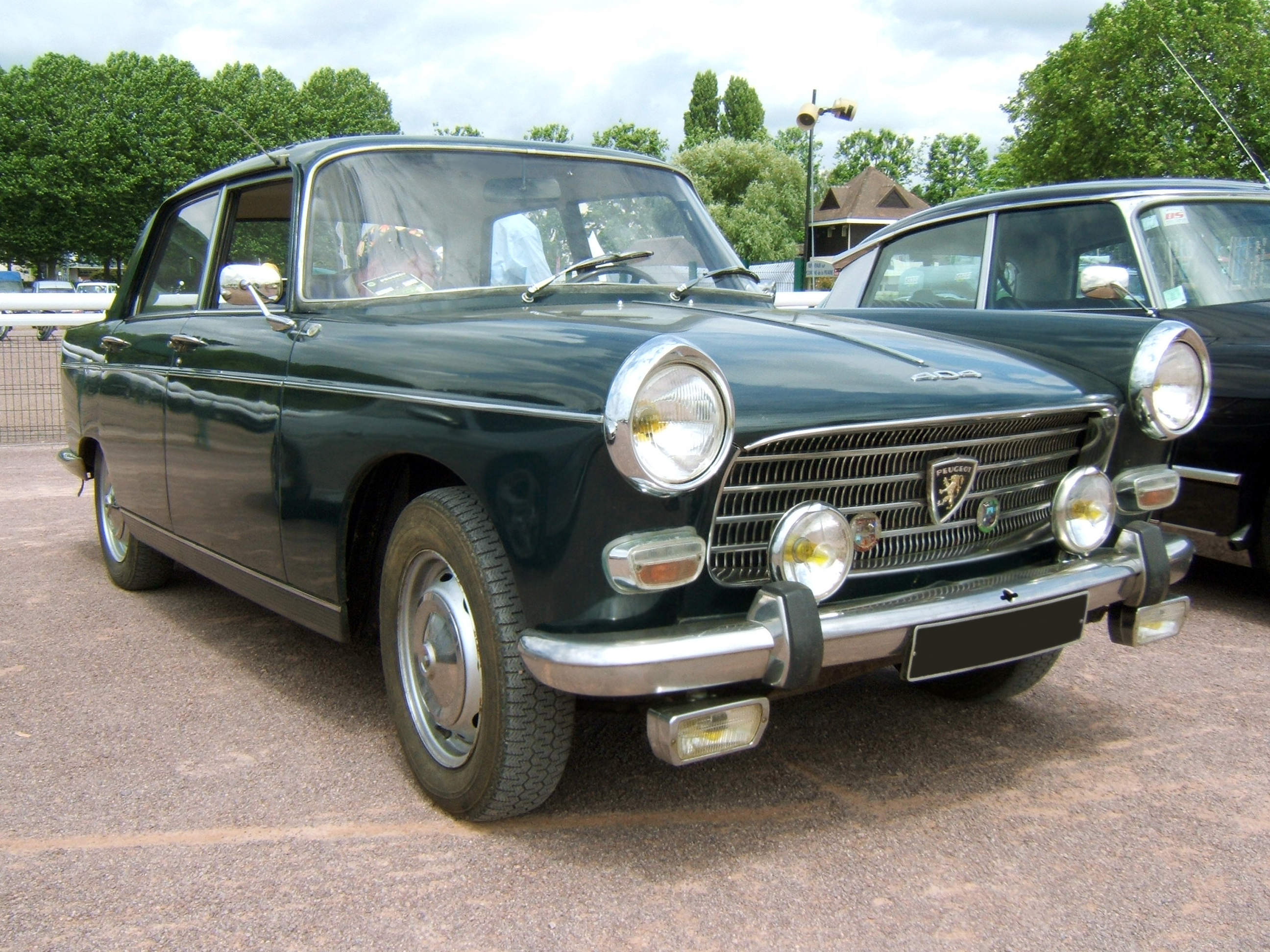
1964 Peugeot 404

Toyota New Zealand Thames

Goldmining centre Thames was from 1872 the base of A&G Price and it remains so. In the 1960s A&G Price was the heavy engineering component of vehicle importer and conglomerate Cable Price Downer, owners with Challenge Corporation of Toyota franchise holder Consolidated Motor Distributors. Steel Motor Assemblies in Christchurch assembled Toyota Coronas for Consolidated Motor Distributors later known as Consolidated Motor Industries.

Campbell Tube Products (exhaust pipes, mufflers) established at Thames in 1939 was a subsidiary of long-established 438 Queen Street and provincial Auckland motor vehicle importers and distributors Campbell Motors (Willys, Studebaker). Already having a presence in Thames Campbell's bought land from Thames's local council in 1963 to build an assembly plant to build vehicles. The assembly business was named Campbell Motor Industries, beginning with assembly of the Peugeot 404. The first 404 left the factory on 3 September 1964. Earlier in the year Campbell Motors acquired the rights to assemble American Motors Rambler which had previously been assembled by VW Motors in Otahuhu, Auckland. The first Rambler to be assembled by Campbell Motors Industries in Thames came off the assembly line also in September 1964. CMI assembled the Rambler Classic, and from 1967 the Rambler Rebel sedan. CMI also imported fully assembled right-hand-drive vehicles from AMC, including the Rambler Rebel station wagon and hardtop coupe. CMI did not continue with assembly of the Rebel's 1971 replacement, the AMC Matador, but assembled the 1970 Rebel again in 1971. A total of 590 Rebel sedans were built by CMI and an additional 177 wagons and hardtops were fully imported. For 1970 only, CMI brought in a small number of fully assembled, right-hand-drive 1970 AMC Ambassador sedans.

From 1966 CMI acquired the rights to assemble Hino Contessas and Isuzu Belletts. Renaults were added in 1967. New Zealand's first Toyota Corollas were assembled by CMI in April 1968 as a joint venture with Consolidate Motor Industries. followed by Datsun in 1970.

Challenge had become the major shareholder by 1975 and by 1977 sold this holding to Consolidated Motor Industries which was renamed Toyota New Zealand in May 1979.

The Thames buildings are now used to refurbish used Toyotas imported from Japan and sold as Signature Toyotas.

== New Zealand Motor Bodies ==
New Zealand Motor Bodies was established as Munt, Cotterell, Neilsen & Company in 1926, located in Petone, Wellington. In 1937 the company name was changed to NZ Motor Bodies. NZMB built metal frame bus and coach bodies and other commercial bodies, hoists and other truck equipment at its Petone plant. They were the first local business to manufacture steel bus bodies in New Zealand, and provided 2,500 bodies for the Army and Air Force during World War II. Its largest customer was New Zealand Railways Road Services. During the 1940s NZMB built buses for NZRRS using the Bedford truck chassis. When the Bedford SB bus was released in Britain in 1950, NZMB continued to build NZRRS buses up until 1980. NZMB built 1,280 SB buses between 1954 and 1981.

In 1978 operations shifted from Petone to Palmerston North. In 1983 the business again changed its name, to Coachwork International. It was by then the largest builder of buses and coaches in New Zealand.

In the early-1980s, NZMB bodied 450 Volvo B58 and Mercedes-Benz buses for Singapore Bus Service. In 1981 it began assembling Plaxton Supreme bodies delivered in CKD packs from England. The company ceased trading in 1993.

== 1970 Nissan ==
The Nissan Motor Distributors assembly plant in Stoddard Road, Mount Roskill opened on 25 March 1974. It assembled sedans, utilities and heavy trucks for Nissan Datsun.

== Components industry ==
Original equipment manufacturers

Locally manufactured components included upholstery, paint, batteries, alloy wheels, tyres and rubber components, springs, windscreens, glass, wiring looms, radios, exhaust systems and bumpers. They had been favoured since the 1920s but received their greatest encouragement immediately after World War II.

The conflict between what seemed commonsense to overseas suppliers and local requirements could make for strange events. It was reported that CKD units were being received with ready installed spark plugs in their engines. Assemblers were obliged to remove and destroy the plugs and replace them with inferior plugs of local manufacture.

The component industry shared the fate of the assembly industry. The 1999 New Zealand Official Year Book reported that there were around 40 component manufacturers left employing about 4,000 people. About $180 million of their $400 million production was exported.

== Location of assembly plants ==
In 1969 p33,

- 72 percent (by quantity) of local assembly was carried out in the Hutt Valley (Note: G.M. 23 per cent; Ford 22; Todd 16; Austin 11)
- 19 percent in Auckland (Note: Dominion Motors 11 per cent; Motor Industries 7; NZ Motor Bodies 1)
- 5 percent in Nelson (Note: Standard Triumph)
- 4 percent in Thames (Note: Campbell Motors)
- 1 percent in Christchurch (Note: Steel Brothers)

== A snapshot of the industry 1966 ==
Passenger vehicle assembly by firm and model 1966
Quantity	Share	Brand
Ford New Zealand
2,118	3.30 percent	Anglia
4,898	7.70 percent	Cortina
3,103	4.90 percent	Zephyr Zodiac
2,128	3.30 percent	Falcon
90	0.20 percent	Other
12,337	19.40 percent	TOTAL
General Motors New Zealand
6,470	10.20 percent	Vauxhall
8,651	13.60 percent	Holden
394	0.60 percent	Chevrolet
201	0.30 percent	Pontiac
36	0.10 percent	Other
15,752	24.80 percent	TOTAL
Todd Motors
5,742	9.00 percent	Hillman/Hunter
3,033	4.80 percent	Chrysler
573	0.90 percent	Singer
325	0.50 percent	Renault
53	0.10 percent	Other
9,726	15.30 percent	TOTAL
Dominion Motors
8,716	13.70 percent	Morris/Nuffield
905	1.40 percent	Wolseley
9,621	15.10 percent	TOTAL
Austin Distributors
1,648	2.60 percent	Austin Mini
2,289	3.60 percent	Austin 1100
1,667	2.60 percent	Austin 1800
228	0.40 percent	Other
5,832	9.20 percent	TOTAL
Motor Industries (International)
2,491	3.90 percent	Volkswagen
1,321	2.10 percent	Fiat
416	0.60 percent	Skoda
371	0.60 percent	Simca
4,599	7.20 percent	TOTAL
Leyland Standard-Triumph
2,331	3.70 percent	Triumph
Steel Bros (Addington)
23	0.00 percent	Toyota
614	1.00 percent	Prince
637	1.00 percent	TOTAL
Campbell Industries
380	0.60 percent	Peugeot
266	0.40 percent	Hino
332	0.50 percent	Rambler
8	0.00 percent	Isuzu
349	0.60 percent	Datsun
1,335	2.10 percent	TOTAL
Other Companies
1,397	2.20 percent	Other Companies
All Companies
63,567	100.00 percent	TOTAL

Source: Report by New Zealand Vehicle Manufacturer as quoted in IBRD statistical data 24 April 1968

== Japanese cars ==
The first Japanese cars constructed in New Zealand were Nissans, then known as Datsuns. Datsun Bluebird P312s were built in Mount Wellington from March 1963. Until it built its own permanent plant in Wiri, south Auckland, in the late 1970s, Nissans were assembled all over New Zealand by NZ Motor Bodies in Mount Wellington (early Bluebirds) Campbell Industries in Thames (1200 and 1600, 120Y, 180B), Motor Holdings, Waitara (1200 wagon, 120Y wagon), Todd Motors, Porirua (180B) a Nissan-owned 'temporary' plant in Mount Roskill, Auckland (1200, 120Y) and commercial vehicle plants in Glen Innes and Mangere.

Other Japanese manufacturers followed Nissan with Toyota Coronas (and later Crowns) being assembled by Steelbro in Christchurch and Campbell Motor Industries (CMI) in Thames building the Corolla from the late 1960s. Steelbro also assembled Lotus Sevens under licence. CMI also assembled Hino Contessas, the Isuzu Bellett, and Toyota Corollas after their takeover of Hino.

New Zealand Motor Corporation first built Hondas in Petone in 1976, adding Mount Wellington later and eventually consolidating at the former Jaguar/Triumph/Rover/Land Rover plant in Nelson. Todd Motors replaced its Petone plant in 1975 with a large new facility in Porirua to produce Mitsubishi, Chrysler and Talbot vehicles plus some Datsuns.

Mazda B-Series pickup trucks were first built by Steel Bros (later Toyota) in 1969 and the first cars in 1972 were made by Motor Holdings in Otahuhu and, later Mount Wellington (taking over the Motor Bodies plant). Later Mazda assembly was shared with Ford in a joint assembly plant called Vehicle Assemblers NZ (VANZ), originally Ford's new Wiri plant opened in 1973.

=== Other makes ===
- Renaults like the Dauphine and R8 were assembled by Todd Motors under contract.
- Prior to Campbell Motors, the first NZ-built Peugeots were assembled at Motor Holdings in Otahuhu.
- Studebakers were first built along with Nash and Hudson at the original Standard plant in Christchurch prior to being made at Motor Holdings.
- Ladas were introduced in the late 1980s and early 1990s as part of an import deal between Fontera's predecessor, the New Zealand Dairy Board and the Soviet Union but were never locally assembled. The franchise was put up for sale in early 1993, as the New Zealand automotive market contracted.
- In 2014 prominent Auckland businessman Toa Greening proposed constructing Tango T600 electric microcars under licence as a means to reducing traffic congestion, particularly in Auckland, New Zealand's largest city.

== New Zealand assembled 1967 ==
In this period the world's fourteen largest motor companies were:

- General Motors, Ford, Chrysler, Volkswagen, Fiat, British Motor Holdings, Renault, Toyota, Citroen, Nissan, Peugeot, American Motors Corporation, Daimler-Benz, Volvo

At that time products of each of them were assembled in New Zealand except in the case of Citroen, Daimler-Benz and Volvo.

== NZIER review 1971 ==
In 1970 three-quarters of the cars produced were assembled in the Hutt Valley, most of the rest were assembled in Auckland. Nine companies carried out the assembly, three of them were overseas-owned. Each company had one plant except one of them (Austin) which had a plant in both Hutt Valley and Auckland. By that time imported components represented just 60 percent of a car's wholesale price fallen from 71 percent in the 1940s.

New Zealand Institute of Economic Research judged that assembly was not capital-intensive and that most of the work required unskilled labour. In 1971 they estimated that including freight but without duty fully imported vehicles would cost around 3 percent less than locally assembled cars. At the same time the costs of local assembly and local components were around double the costs if carried out by the overseas manufacturer. The report of the Institute's study claimed that limiting the then-current production levels to one or two models assembled by one or two plants would bring significant savings from economies of scale. It was also claimed that production of 200,000 units a year would be needed to give major economies of scale. In summary, forcing local manufacture was not difficult but the results were not fully satisfactory. It was suggested that the protection afforded British and Australian vehicles be dropped as low as permitted by treaties with those countries.

== Demise of the assembly plants ==
With the reduction and removal of tariffs through the 1980s and 1990s plus the importation of second-hand Japanese cars, the major assembly plants began to close. New Zealand Motor Corporation which had closed its ageing Newmarket plant in 1976 and Petone plant in 1982 closed their Panmure plant in 1988. General Motors closed its Petone plant in 1984 and its Trentham plant in 1990. 1987 saw a run of closures: Motor Industries International, Otahuhu, Ford Seaview, Motor Holdings Waitara. Suzuki in Wanganui closed 1988 and VANZ (Note: Vehicle Assemblers of New Zealand a joint Ford and Mazda operation) at Sylvia Park in 1997. Toyota Christchurch in 1996 and VANZ Wiri the next year. Finally in 1998 along with Mitsubishi Porirua, bought from Todd in 1987, Nissan shutdown at Wiri, Honda closed in Nelson and Toyota in Thames.

Redundancies occurred in manufacturing industry; approximately 76,000 manufacturing jobs were lost between 1987 and 1992.

Source
	Capacity 1985	Plants 1985	Plants 1988
Ford	20,000	2	1
General Motors	18,000	1	1
Mazda	2,760	1	1
Motor Holdings	9.200	2	—
NZMC / Honda	15,000	2	1
Nissan	10,900	2	1
Suzuki	2,990	1	—
Todd / Mitsubishi	24,000	1	1
Toyota	20,000	2	2
Total	122,850	14	8

== Second hand imports and left hand drive vehicles ==
In the early 1990s, import regulations were relaxed and an influx of Japanese second hand vehicles occurred. These had a two-fold effect. Second hand car prices collapsed and the New Zealand public were faced with a huge range of Japan-only, low mileage motor vehicles, many of which were unheard of in neighbouring Australia, where otherwise car trends were similar. The relaxation of regulations also led to many imported American and European cars, trucks and SUVs.

Despite being a right hand drive country many left hand drive cars, mostly from the United States or Canada, could be seen on New Zealand roads until 2001 when the New Zealand government introduced new regulations requiring owners of LHD cars to have a special permit. Prior to this a permit was not required to own and use a left hand drive vehicle. Accordingly, subsequently imported LHD vehicles were required to be converted to right hand drive with some exceptions.

The two main exceptions are: Category A. LHD vehicles under 20 years of age that have been recognised as special interest vehicles by the NZ Transport Agency and have been issued with a Category A left-hand drive vehicle permit, and Category B. Light vehicles that were manufactured 20 years or more before the vehicle was certified in New Zealand.

== Local manufacturers ==
=== From Trekka to date ===
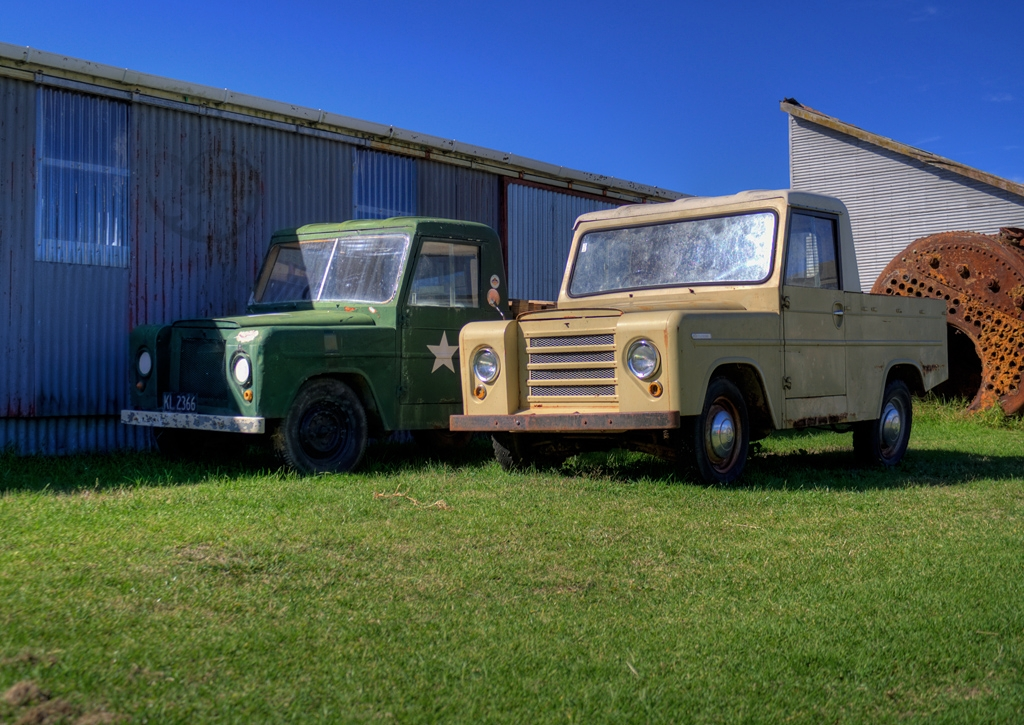
Trekka pick-ups

Legislation had created a virtual closed shop to local manufacturers with the large assembly plants of General Motors, Ford, Todd Motors and Dominion Motors making it nearly impossible for indigenous start-up companies to compete. Several ventures started making utility vehicles, mainly aimed at farmers such as the Trailmaker (1965–71), the Terra (1967–1975) and the most successful the Trekka from 1966 to 1973. Others in the same period attempted to make production cars like the Anziel and Hamilton Walker's Rotarymotive never got started. There was also a reasonably successful farm vehicle, the three wheel Gnat Scarab built by J Cameron Lewis & Co Ltd in Christchurch. It was not intended for on road use.

In 1974 two young Whataroa brothers, Kevin and Rodney Giles, formed the Duzgo Manufacturing Company to make a small two wheel drive light utility vehicle for use primarily on farms. Their creation, called the Duzgo was made using assorted Austin and Morris parts, a single-cylinder Kohler 12 hp engine and a double gearbox giving 12 forward and three reverse gears. Later models used a Robin 14–16 hp twin opposed engine. It was light and ran on knobbly motorcycle tyres which gave it excellent traction in muddy farm conditions. In all 10 were made by 1979 before the Customs Department determined that they were a vehicle manufacturing business and therefore needed to pay 30 percent sales tax on each vehicle. This effectively ended their business. In 2004 a Duzgo featured in the BBC series Billy Connolly's World Tour of New Zealand. There is a Duzgo (possibly number 1) in the Coaltown Museum, Queen Street, Westport and several still remain in use. Following in this tradition of farm utility vehicles was the Avatar UTV, which began as a concept of Hamish Gilbert in 2009. The vehicles are manufactured for Avatar in China.

With the removal of all tariffs in 1998, new car companies need to be able to compete directly against overseas competition. The most recent New Zealand companies to try have been aimed niche markets. The first was Hulme in 2006, which is aiming to create a model for the supercar market. Its website stated that the first production model was expected to be completed in 2012. It was followed in 2013 by Martin Foster's Zetini Haast Barchetta, another sports car. In 2014 it was priced at $NZ215,590 plus GST with a six-month lead time for delivery. Whether either of these companies has sold any cars, as at May 2015, is unknown.

In 2016 Mike McMaster designed and Magoos Street Rods of Kuripuni, Masterton made a version of the tuktuk. The three wheel machine used a mix of Suzuki Swift and Harley-Davidson parts. He planned to initially build about 20 per annum.

=== Alternative fuel vehicle development ===
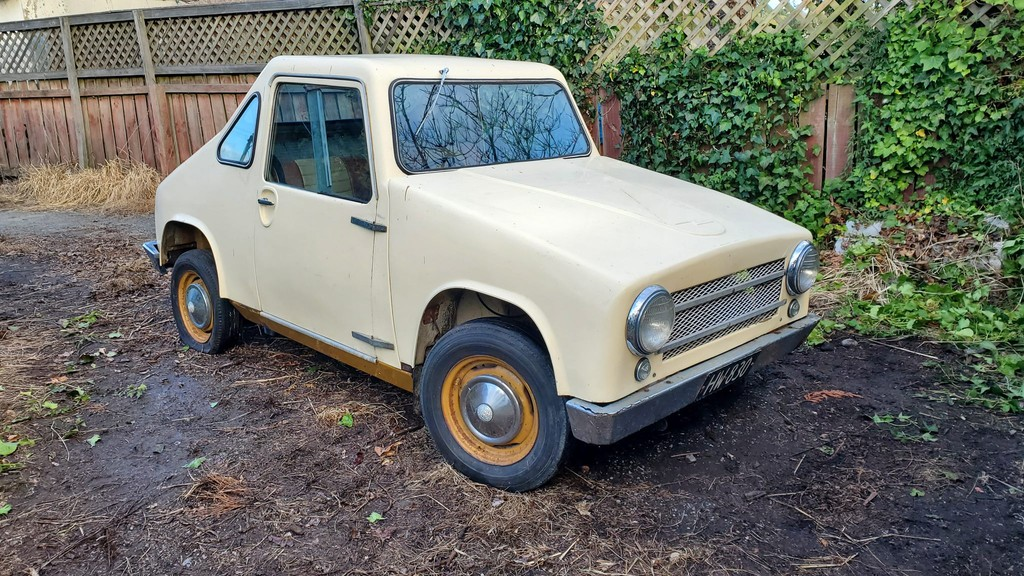
Proto-type electric car made by Timaru engineer and inventor Donald MacConachie

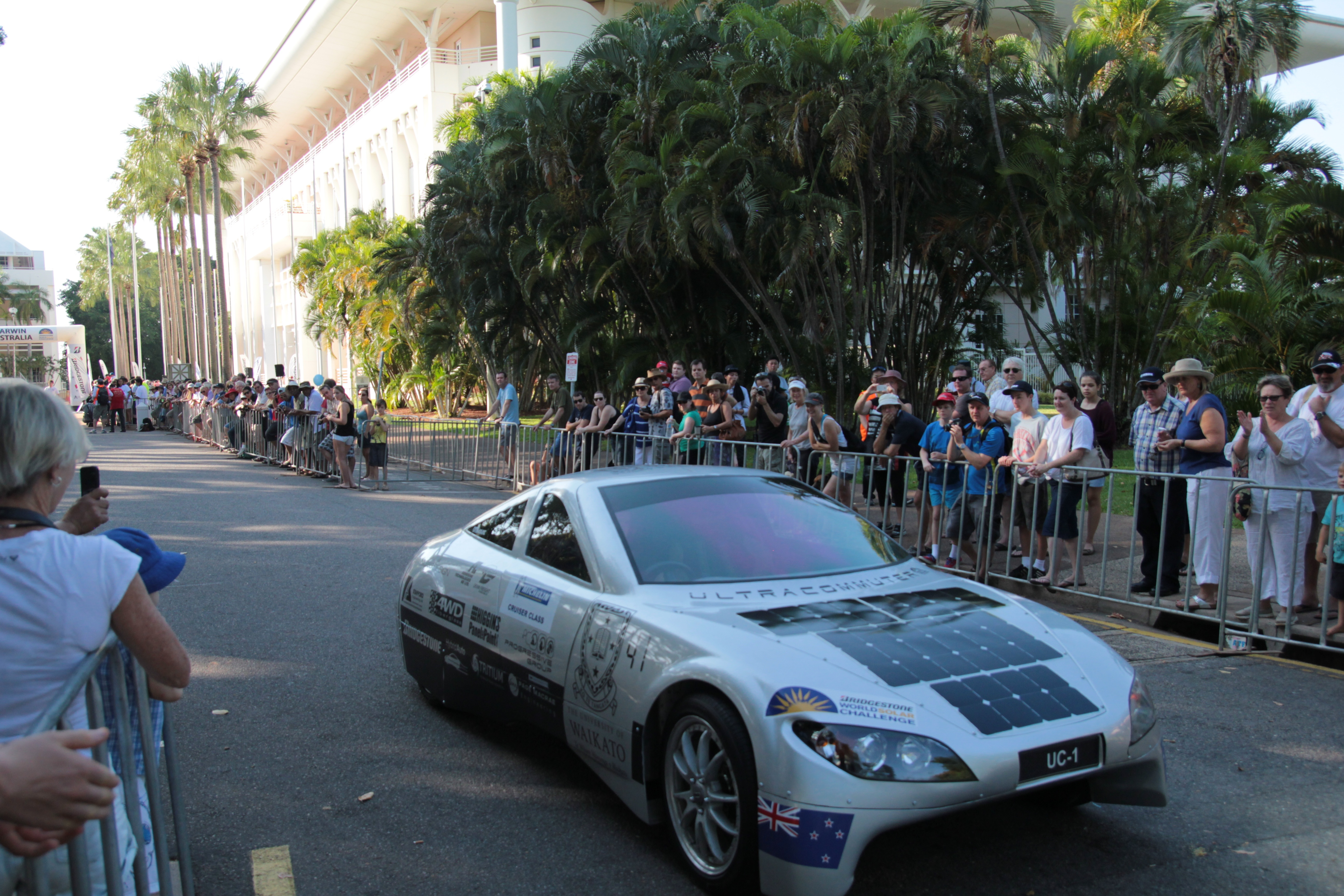
UltraCommuter in 2013

There have been several electric vehicles developed in New Zealand, although none have made it into production. Auckland, Waikato, and Canterbury University's have been researching electric powered vehicles. The latter since the 1970s. Also in the 1970s, Timaru engineer and inventor Donald MacConachie made about eight electric cars intending to mass-produce them for the Kiwi market for the New Zealand market. Only one of these was believed to be in existence in 2022. In 1995 by Heron called the PC80 and made for the electricity supply company Powerco.

Canterbury University Department of Electrical and Electronic Engineering's first vehicle, EV1, was registered for road use in September 1976. This was followed by a modified 1962 Austin A40 Farina, renamed EV2, in the early 1980s. This underwent further development up until 2000. In 1999 Simon Round of the Department acquired a 1992 second-generation Toyota MR2 which was shipped to New Zealand from Japan. The project on this car, renamed EV3, began in 2001 with the car being registered for road use in May 2006.

The Engineering School of Waikato University University of Waikato assisted in the development of an electric powered vehicle called the UltraCommuter in 2008 and continued work on electric and solar-powered vehicles with a Suzuki Carry being converted to electricity in 2014. The van was to be driven to Christchurch to take part in New Zealand's first electric motorsport event, Evolocity on 30 November 2014.

Auckland University has been working on inductive power transfer technology for a number of years. This provides a means of recharging electric vehicles without the need for them to be directly coupled to a power supply. In 2013 Otago Polytechnic Associate Professor Zi Ming (Tom) Qi along with students from the Polytechnic, the National Taiwan University of Science and Technology, and China's Shenzhen Polytechnic teamed to develop an electric car which was driven by electric motors and had four independently turning wheels. By November 2015 Qi announced that the car was being manufactured in China for assembly in New Zealand.

=== Kit cars and replicas ===
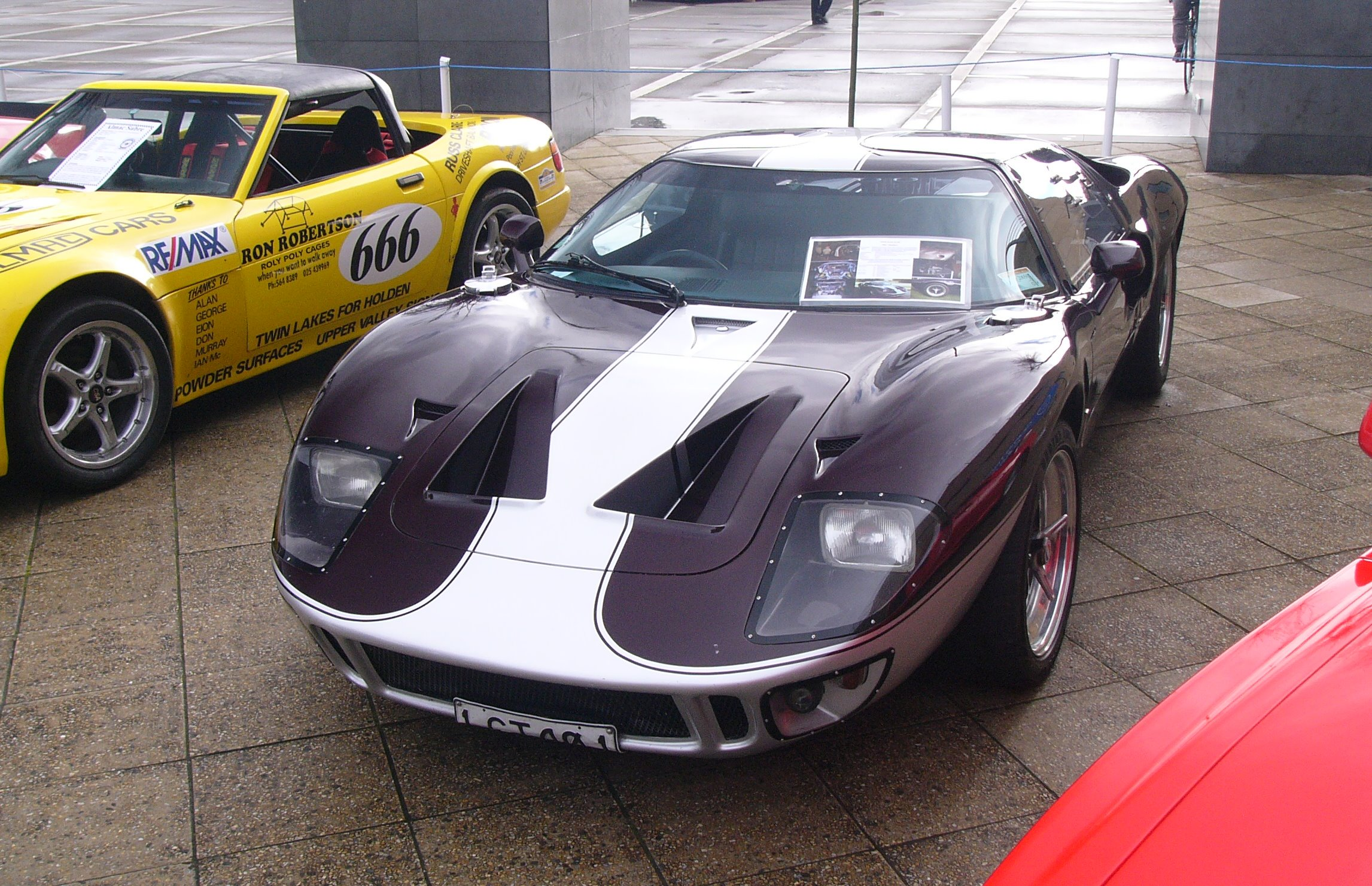
GT40

New Zealand has a long history of small garages and vehicle enthusiasts modifying and creating sports and sports racing cars. The Everson brothers, who were noted for making New Zealand first indigenous twin engined mono-plane, between 1935 and 1937 created a small two-seater rear engined car called the Everson Cherub. Three different one-off models were made by the brothers. Ernest's son Cliff built a variety of Everson models from the 1960s to the 1980s. The most successful was his eight Cherub's that were similar in design to the Mini Moke.

In the early 1950s, with the advent of fibreglass bodied cars, a new opportunity arose for local companies associated with car enthusiasts to create car bodies. Among these early manufacturers was Weltex Plastics Limited of Christchurch, which imported a Microplas Mistral sports car mould and began making bodies and chassis in 1956. They were followed in 1958 by Frank Cantwell's Puma and Bruce Goldwater's Cougar. Also in New Zealand during this period, Ferris de Joux was constructing a variety of sports racers. De Joux is noted in particular for his Mini GT from the 1960s.

Ross Baker's Heron Cars started in 1962 making racing cars and eventually began producing kit cars in 1980. Bill Ashton, formerly of Microplas and Weltex, joined with Ted George in the 1960s and made the Tiki. Three were known to have been made. Graham McRae with Steve Bond of Gemini Plastics imported a replica Le Mans McLaren M6B styled GT mould in 1968, The cars were made and sold by Dave Harrod and Steve Bond of Fibreglass Developments Ltd, Bunnythorpe as the Maram. McRae went on to make a very good Porsche Spyder replica in the 1990s.

A number of new companies entered the market in the 1980s - Almac 1985, Alternative Cars (1984), Cheetah (1986), Chevron (1984), Countess Mouldings (1988), Fraser (1988), Leitch (1986), and Saker (1989). Some recent ones are Beattie (automobile) (1997), which became Redline in 2001, and McGregor (2001).

Two companies which specialise in making replicas of various models to order are Classic Car Developments (1992) and Tempero. Both of these companies were noted for the quality of their workmanship. Commencing in 2002, Coventry Classics from Gore specialised in making replica Jaguar C-Types.

==== Racing cars ====
As with kit cars, there have been numerous one-off racing cars made in New Zealand. Companies which have manufactured a number of cars, other than the kit sports cars, are Auto Research, which made Formula Vs and Formula Fords in the 1970s and one Formula Junior; and Sabre Motorsport which currently makes Formula Firsts. Another notable racing car manufacturer was George Begg, who made a series of successful Tasman Cup cars in the early to mid-1970s.

== New vehicles registered and used imports registered ==
(calendar years ended 31 December)

Year	New	Used	0	10	20	30	40	50	60	70	80	90	100	110	120	130	140	150	160	170	180	190	200	210	220	230	240	250	ths
1975	78,750	4,863																											
1976	70,251	3,276																											
1977	59,074	2,750																											
1978	64,468	2,681																											
1979	68,159	2,682																											
1980	75,671	2,701																											
1981	89,466	1,907																											
1982	83,667	1,812																											
1983	74,085	1,766																											
1984	96,418	2,019																											
1985	81,516	2,918																											
1986	76,075	3,946																											
1987	77,499	12,129																											
1988	71,217	17,372																											
1989	83,862	50,966																											
1990	74,422	85,324																											
1991	55,615	47,351																											
1992	52,964	39,146																											
1993	53,822	43,841																											
1994	61.765	62,088																											
1995	65,680	80,976																											
1996	64,414	111,769																											
1997	58,558	97,041																											
1998	54,154	99,937																											
1999	58,195	131,118																											
2000	57,618	116,124																											
2001	58,162	128,693																											
2002	64,086	136,418																											
2003	70,453	156,972																											
2004	74,755	154,042																											
2005	77,825	152,488																											
2006	76,804	123,390																											
2007	77,454	120,382																											
2008	73,397	90,841																											
2009	54,404	68,757																											
2010	62,029	88,612																											
2011	64,019	80,852																											
2012	76,871	78,311																											
2013	82,436	98,971																											
2014	90,635	129,925																											
2015	95,099	143,642																											
2016	102647	149,526																											
2017	108616	165,654																											
2018	108210	147,637																											

== Museums and collections ==
Museum of Transport & Technology
National Transport & Toy Museum
Nelson Classic Car Collection
Omaka Classic Cars
Southward Car Museum
Transport World
Warbirds & Wheels
Yaldhurst Museum

British Car Museum
Classics Museum Hamilton
East Coast Museum of Technology
Geraldine Vintage Car & Machinery Museum
Highlands National Motorsport Museum
Monterey Park Motor Museum
Northland Firehouse Museum
Packard Motor Museum
Taranaki Aviation Transport and Technology Museum

== See also ==
- Carless days in New Zealand
- Driving licence in New Zealand
- Kit and replica cars of New Zealand
- Licence plate lookup systems of New Zealand
- List of automobile museums
- List of motorcycle manufacturers
- Ministry of Transport (New Zealand)
- Motor Sport in New Zealand
- New Zealand Road Code
- NZ Transport Agency
- Transport in New Zealand
- Vehicle registration plates of New Zealand
- VTNZ
- Deindustrialisation
- Automotive industry in Australia
