= Opihi =

Opihi or Ōpihi may refer to:

- Cellana, sea snails known as ‘opihi in Hawaiian.
- Opihi, New Zealand
- Ōpihi River, Canterbury, New Zealand
- Ōpihi Whanaungakore, a Māori burial ground near Whakatāne, New Zealand
- Opihi Pickers, Hawaiian reggae group
- Opihi College, secondary school in Temuka, New Zealand
