= Waitohi =

Farming locality in Canterbury, New Zealand

- Rural area
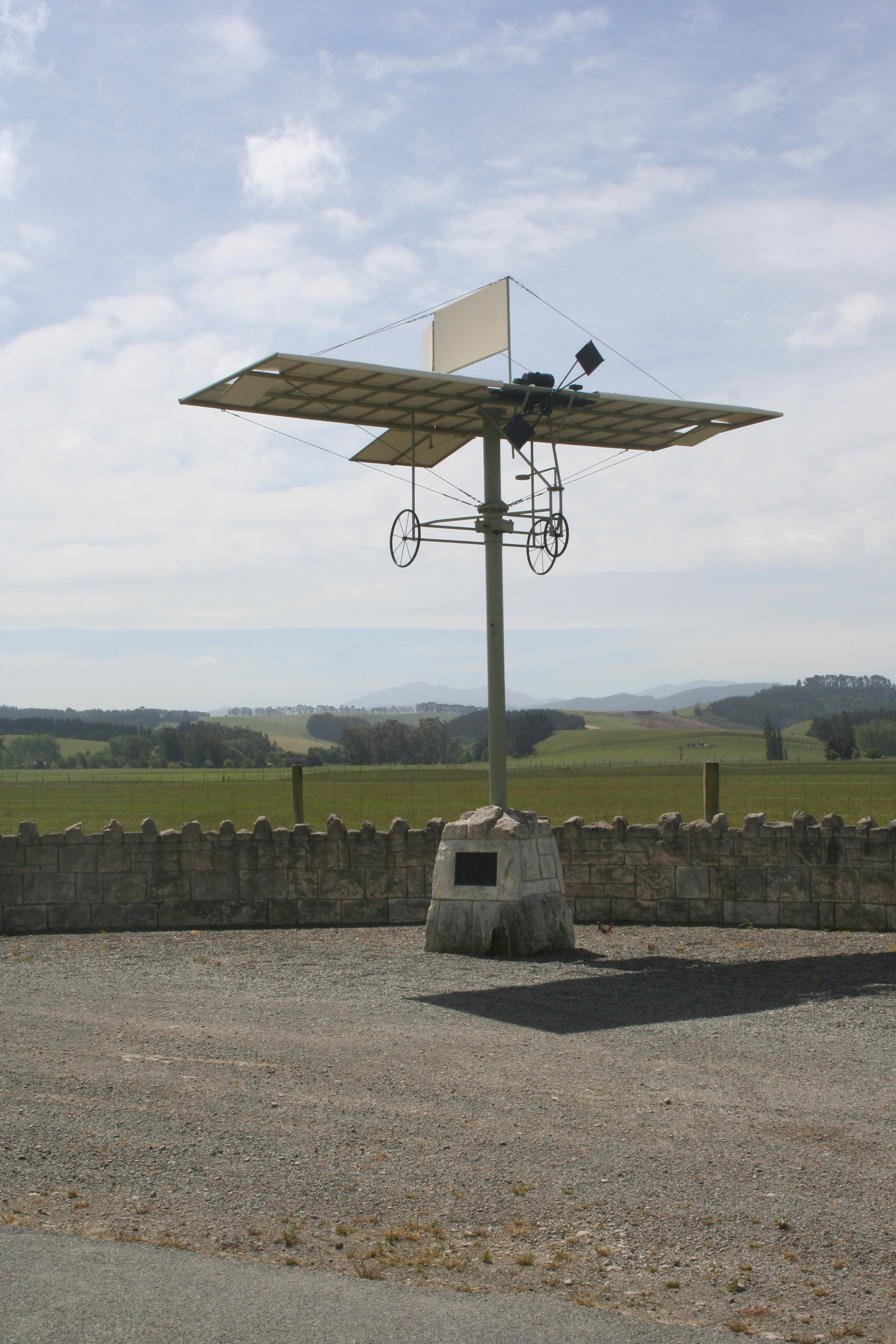
- Richard Pearse monument
- Interactive map of Waitohi
- Coordinates: 44°13′S 171°11′E
- Country: New Zealand
- Region: Canterbury
- Territorial authority: Timaru District
- Ward: Pleasant Point-Temuka
- Community: Temuka
- Electorates: Waitaki; Te Tai Tonga (Māori)

Government
  - Territorial authority: Timaru District Council
  - Regional council: Environment Canterbury
  - Mayor of Timaru: Nigel Bowen
  - Waitaki MP: Miles Anderson
  - Te Tai Tonga MP: Tākuta Ferris

Area
  - Total: 103.38 km^{2} (39.92 sq mi)

Population (2023 census)
  - Total: 222
  - Density: 2.15/km^{2} (5.56/sq mi)
- Time zone: UTC+12 (NZST)
  - Summer (DST): UTC+13 (NZDT)
- Postcode: 7985
- Area code: 03
- Local iwi: Ngāi Tahu

Waitohi, Waitohi Flat and Upper Waitohi are small farming centres from 5 to 16 km west of Temuka and north of the Opihi river, South Canterbury in New Zealand. They are about 20 km north of Timaru.

It is the area where Richard Pearse, a pioneer aviator, lived and farmed. From 1902 to 1904, Richard Pearce built and flew experimental aircraft on his Waitohi farm and managed to achieve powered flight.

== Demographics ==
Waitohi locality covers 103.38 km^{2} (39.92 sq mi). It is part of the Waitohi statistical area.

Historical population for Waitoki locality
Year	Pop.	±% p.a.
2006	222	—
2013	210	−0.79%
2018	219	+0.84%
2023	222	+0.27%

Waitohi had a population of 222 in the 2023 New Zealand census, an increase of 3 people (1.4%) since the 2018 census, and an increase of 12 people (5.7%) since the 2013 census. There were 123 males and 102 females in 81 dwellings. There were 48 people (21.6%) aged under 15 years, 30 (13.5%) aged 15 to 29, 126 (56.8%) aged 30 to 64, and 24 (10.8%) aged 65 or older.

People could identify as more than one ethnicity. The results were 89.2% European (Pākehā), 5.4% Māori, 1.4% Pasifika, 6.8% Asian, and 5.4% other, which includes people giving their ethnicity as "New Zealander". English was spoken by 95.9%, and other languages by 8.1%. No language could be spoken by 2.7% (e.g. too young to talk). The percentage of people born overseas was 17.6, compared with 28.8% nationally.

Religious affiliations were 35.1% Christian, 1.4% Hindu, and 1.4% Islam. People who answered that they had no religion were 55.4%, and 8.1% of people did not answer the census question.

Of those at least 15 years old, 33 (19.0%) people had a bachelor's or higher degree, 96 (55.2%) had a post-high school certificate or diploma, and 33 (19.0%) people exclusively held high school qualifications. 27 people (15.5%) earned over $100,000 compared to 12.1% nationally. The employment status of those at least 15 was 111 (63.8%) full-time, 30 (17.2%) part-time, and 3 (1.7%) unemployed.

=== Waitohi statistical area ===
The Waitohi statistical area includes Winchester and Milford Huts, and surrounds but does not include Temuka. It covers 371.78 km^{2} (143.55 sq mi) and had an estimated population of 1,820 as of June 2025, with a population density of 4.9 people per km^{2}.

Historical population for the statistical area
Year	Pop.	±% p.a.
2006	1,602	—
2013	1,737	+1.16%
2018	1,761	+0.27%
2023	1,758	−0.03%

Waitohi statistical area had a population of 1,758 in the 2023 New Zealand census, a decrease of 3 people (−0.2%) since the 2018 census, and an increase of 21 people (1.2%) since the 2013 census. There were 930 males and 828 females in 714 dwellings. 2.4% of people identified as LGBTIQ+. The median age was 41.7 years (compared with 38.1 years nationally). There were 312 people (17.7%) aged under 15 years, 273 (15.5%) aged 15 to 29, 873 (49.7%) aged 30 to 64, and 297 (16.9%) aged 65 or older.

People could identify as more than one ethnicity. The results were 85.0% European (Pākehā); 12.1% Māori; 2.0% Pasifika; 5.8% Asian; 1.5% Middle Eastern, Latin American and African New Zealanders (MELAA); and 4.8% other, which includes people giving their ethnicity as "New Zealander". English was spoken by 96.9%, Māori by 1.9%, Samoan by 0.2%, and other languages by 9.0%. No language could be spoken by 1.7% (e.g. too young to talk). New Zealand Sign Language was known by 0.7%. The percentage of people born overseas was 17.2, compared with 28.8% nationally.

Religious affiliations were 32.9% Christian, 0.7% Hindu, 0.9% Māori religious beliefs, 0.3% Buddhist, 0.2% New Age, and 0.9% other religions. People who answered that they had no religion were 56.0%, and 8.4% of people did not answer the census question.

Of those at least 15 years old, 180 (12.4%) people had a bachelor's or higher degree, 858 (59.3%) had a post-high school certificate or diploma, and 408 (28.2%) people exclusively held high school qualifications. The median income was $41,300, compared with $41,500 nationally. 111 people (7.7%) earned over $100,000 compared to 12.1% nationally. The employment status of those at least 15 was 771 (53.3%) full-time, 234 (16.2%) part-time, and 36 (2.5%) unemployed.
