= Cecil Wood =

Cecil Wood may refer to:

- Cecil Wood (architect) (1878–1947), New Zealand architect
- Cecil Wood (bishop) (1874–1937), fourth Anglican Bishop of Melanesia
- Cecil Wood (English cricketer) (1875–1960), English cricketer
- Cecil Wood (Australian cricketer) (1896-1990), Australian cricketer
- Cecil Wood (engineer) (1874–1965), engineer and inventor from New Zealand

== See also ==
- Wood (surname)
