= Hipa =

Hipa is a surname. Notable people with the surname include:

- Ian Hipa, Niuean businessman, and politician
- Nick Hipa (born 1982), American musician
- Richard Hipa (1957–2025), Niuean politician

== See also ==
- Hipa Te Maihāroa (died 1886), New Zealand tribal leader, tohunga and prophet
- HIPAA, the Health Insurance Portability and Accountability Act
