= Upper Waitohi =

- Rural Area
- Location within New Zealand
- Coordinates: 44.20777°S 171.12753°E
- Country: New Zealand
- Region: Canterbury
- Territorial authority: Timaru District
- Elevation: 96 m (315 ft)
- Time zone: UTC+12 (NZST)
  - Summer (DST): UTC+13 (NZDT)
- Postcode: 7985
- Area code: 03
- Local iwi: Ngāi Tahu

Upper Waitohi is a small rural community in the Timaru District, New Zealand. It is located north of Pleasant Point and north-west of Temuka. A monument dedicated to pioneer aviator Richard Pearse is located in the area.
