= Richard Pearse =

New Zealand aviation pioneer (1877–1953)

Richard William Pearse
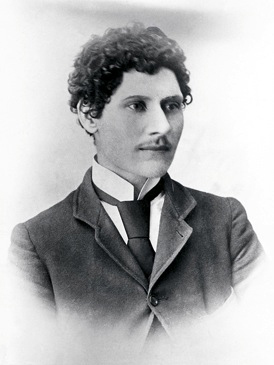
- Richard Pearse in 1903
- Born: 3 December 1877; Waitohi Flat, South Canterbury, New Zealand
- Died: 29 July 1953 (aged 75); Christchurch, Canterbury, New Zealand
- Other names: Dick "Aeroplane" Pearse, Bamboo Dick
- Education: Waitohi Flat School and Upper Waitohi School
- Occupations: Farmer, inventor
- Known for: Pioneering flights in heavier-than-air aircraft
- Relatives: Alfred Pearse; Malcolm Sargent; Edgar Francis Babst, (cousin)

Richard William Pearse (3 December 1877 – 29 July 1953) was a New Zealand farmer and inventor who performed pioneering aviation experiments. Witnesses interviewed many years afterwards describe observing Pearse flying and landing a powered heavier-than-air machine on 31 March 1903, nine months before the Wright brothers flew. Ambiguous statements made by Pearse himself make it difficult to date the aviation experiments with certainty. In a newspaper interview in 1909, with respect to inventing a flying machine, he said "I did not attempt anything practical with the idea until 1904".

Biographer Gordon Ogilvie credits Pearse with "several far-sighted concepts: a monoplane configuration, wing flaps and rear elevator, tricycle undercarriage with steerable nosewheel, and a propeller with variable-pitch blades."

Pearse largely ended his early flying experiments about 1911 but pioneered novel aircraft and aero-engine invention from 1933 with the development of his "private plane for the million", a foldable single-engined tiltrotor convertiplane.

== Early life ==
Richard William Pearse, born at Waitohi Flat, South Canterbury, New Zealand, on 3 December 1877, was the fourth of nine children of Digory Sargent Pearse (1844–1932) of South Petherwin, Cornwall, England, and Sarah Anne Brown (c.1850–1937) of County Londonderry, Ireland. Digory had migrated to New Zealand via South Australia in 1864–1865 and had taken up farming at Upper Waitohi, near Temuka. There he met and married Sarah, who had come to New Zealand to be with her sister at Temuka in about 1867.

Digory and Sarah taught each of their children to play a musical instrument and formed a family orchestra. Richard played the cello, which he always kept close to hand. The family were also good tennis players; his brother Warne competing in New Zealand championships for some 25 years.

Richard Pearse attended the Waitohi Flat School from 1883 and Upper Waitohi School from 1891 to 1893, where, deep in thought at times and as a keen reader, he pursued an interest in technology. Peter Friel, a classmate at Upper Waitohi School, told researchers that Pearse came to school one morning with a device he had made from a herring in tomato sauce tin cut to form a multi-blade rotor, mounted to a cotton reel base—a string-pull helicopter. Seated on its launcher's peg and placed on a bench, he wound string around the reel and pulled away, whereupon the reel-rotor flew off and out of sight. Friel continued, "That’s how he got the start of that flying business!" Pearse revealed to the Timaru Post in 1909 that: "From the time I was quite a little chap, I had a great fancy for engineering, and when I was still quite a young man, I conceived the idea of inventing a flying machine."

His father's investment in eldest son Thomas's medical degree at Edinburgh put aside any thought of support for Richard's aspiration to study engineering at Canterbury College in Christchurch. Instead, at age 21 in 1898, his father set him up with the use of 100 acres (40.5 ha) of Waitohi farmland, upon which, over the next 13 years, he established a workshop, realised his ideas for bicycles, aero engines, flying machines and other contraptions, and kept some 76–286 sheep.

== Career ==
=== Early engineering work ===
A hint of Pearse's earliest flying machine work at Waitohi, South Canterbury, came from Jean Currie, in her 20s at the time. When interviewed by researchers Tom Bradley and Geoff Rodliffe she recalled that quite some time before her family moved from Waitohi Flat to Morven in 1899, her father, Thomas Currie, farmer, and uncle, Alexander McClintock, blacksmith, had walked up to Pearse's workshop one Sunday only to return soon after, saying: "If he gets that contraption in the air he will fall out and kill himself." Though others spoke of Pearse working on his plane at the turn of the century or during the Boer War, Currie's account is dateable by Thomas Currie's acquisition of land in the Waikakahi Estate ballot of March 1899 and the family's departure from Waitohi.

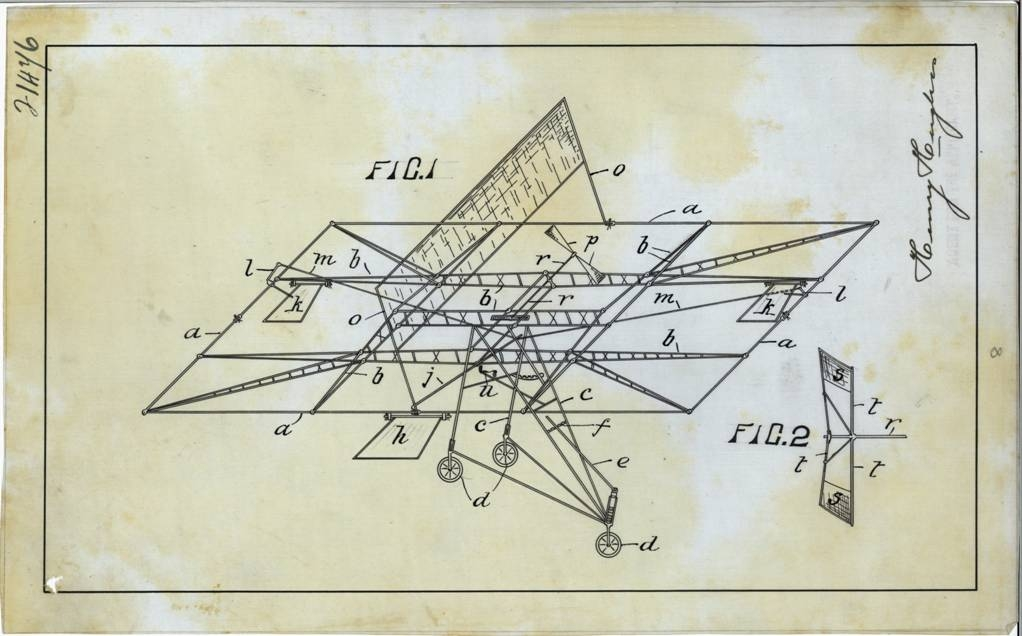
Figure 1, An Improved Aerial or Flying Machine, Complete Specification, New Zealand Patent no. 21476. Inventor: R W Pearse

As no light suitably powered engines could be purchased at that time, many pioneering inventors made their own. In 1951, Pearse, then 73 years old, told Dr. J R Gilmour during an examination for aged care, that he had made an engine away back "during the Boer War". This could be anytime between 1899 and 1902. In that period, the only person available to Pearse, with knowledge of building hydrocarbon engines, was Cecil Wood of Timaru, who, from the mid-1890s, had pioneered New Zealand built internal combustion engines, motorcars and motorcycles. In later years, Wood told George Bolt and Harold Cederman that Pearse had visited him "in 1901 and 1902, and was shown how to make spark plugs with the central electrode insulated by mica. Wood also helped him with the design of surface carburettors."

The earliest technical description of his two-cylinder horizontally-opposed double-acting four-stroke "oil engine", was published in the 19 July 1906 provisional specification of Pearse's patent application, An Improved Aerial or Flying Machine (New Zealand Patent no. 21476), and indicated in Figure 1 of the 1907 complete specification; its existence confirmed by the recovery of two 4 inch bore x 12 inch cast iron cylinder relics in 1971. The two pistons were connected by a single piston rod, with the crank-arm and crank mechanism, turning the propeller shaft, mounted about the centre. Calculations indicate the engine could have produced as much as 15 hp (11.19 kW); "quite enough power to get a plane off the ground. The Wright brothers, after all, managed their 1903 flights on 12 hp."

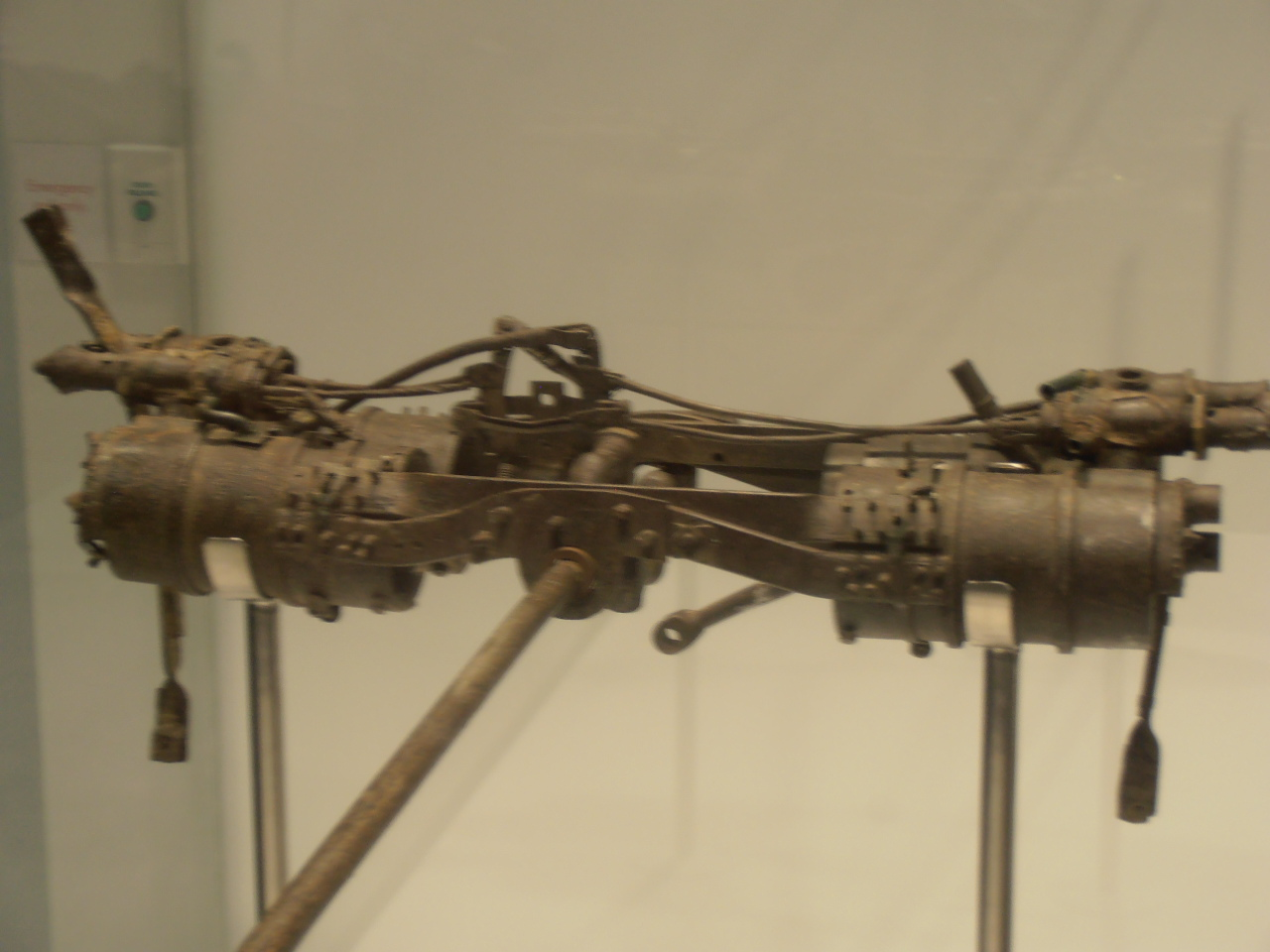
Richard Pearse's 25 hp (18.64 kW) water-cooled four-cylinder aero engine on display at MOTAT

Crudely built, this two-cylinder engine appears to be Pearse's earliest, preceding his light 25 hp (18.64 kW) four-cylinder horizontally-opposed single-acting four-stroke engine which features in a 1909 Temuka Leader article. Pearse informed the Minister of Defence in May 1945, he had started to work on the four-cylinder engine from about February 1904, a few months after Samuel Langley's aeroplane failed to fly. He referred to the 25 hp engine as an "aeroplane motor", his "first motor" and the "first single-acting 4 cylinder motor".

At some point Pearse mounted the earlier two-cylinder engine within the flying machine—a tricycle undercarriage surmounted by a fabric-covered bamboo wing structure. In general layout the machine resembled modern aircraft design: monoplane rather than biplane; tractor rather than pusher propeller. Witnesses tended to agree that the flying machine had no tail section.

Pearse's interest in engineering was not confined to aviation. In 1902, at Waitohi, Pearse invented a novel bell-crank pedal lever type bicycle with self-inflating tyres. Messrs. Martin and Co. of Christchurch built the bicycle, and Pearse made key components himself. Traveling up to Christchurch, he filed a patent application for the invention, via his newly appointed patent agent Henry Hughes, with the Christchurch Patent Office on 8 February 1902 (New Zealand Patent no. 14507)—his first patent. Coincidentally, on the day the Patent Office issued Letters Patent, Pearse's bicycle drew public attention when he rode it in to Temuka on Sale Day, Tuesday, 19 May 1903, and Timaru on Wednesday, 20 May 1903.

=== Flights ===
Researchers into Pearse's aeronautical work had located some 55 surviving witnesses by the 1980s. They assigned a principal category to each witness at that time: 20 had seen a flight or more, 9 had seen a plane on a hedge or in the workshop awaiting repairs, 2 had heard the plane in flight but did not see it, 7 had a second hand account of seeing flight, 10 knew of flights and 7 had seen or knew of the flying machine under construction.

Some witness accounts suggest Pearse flew in 1902; others indicate a series of flights in 1903, ending in winter that year. Some dateable events recalled as occurring about the time of the flights were: immediately after excessive flooding of the Ōpihi River on 23–24 March 1902; on 31 March, preceding April Fools' Day; within a year of the end of the Second Boer War and following the disbanding of the 9th Contingent, New Zealand Mounted Rifles, South Island Regiment, in New Zealand on 21 August 1902; about the time of Eugen Sandow's visit to Timaru, 26–29 December 1902; during Honora Crowley's last teaching year at Upper Waitohi School to September 1903; and before the Big Snow snowstorm from 11 July 1903. Following decades of research to establish dates, 31 March 1903 is noted by historians as the day when Pearse may have achieved some sort of witnessed flight.

==== 1903 March 31: Upper Waitohi School take off, Main Waitohi Road ====
With the help of Pearse's brother Warne, the aeroplane was pushed 800 metres up the gravel road to the Upper Waitohi School crossroads, where two dozen spectators gathered to watch the fun. During several attempts to get the machine to work, the crowd dwindled to a handful of people. On the final effort Richard signalled to Warne to pull the propeller to start the engine, while boulders placed in front of the wheels, and volunteers, restrained the plane. After a short time the engine picked up speed. The boulders were then released, and the aircraft was given a push by volunteers.

The Plane taxied for a considerable distance, keeping to the centre of the road. Pearse then accelerated, and the machine rose sluggishly into the air, sounding 'rather like a chaffcutter'. It was travelling at an estimated 30km/h, with a peak altitude exceeding 3 metres. Decades later witnesses provided affidavits describing the plane pitching and wobbling in the air, followed by a final leftward swerve onto the top of a four metre high gorse fence which fronted Pearse's property. Estimates for the distance covered by witnesses vary from 45 metres to 400 metres, with an average of 135 metres. Richard hurt his shoulder during the crash. He was taken to hospital to see if he had broken his collar bone, but it was not, and he returned home the next day. The hospital later burnt down along with the records.

The following day, witnesses describe telling other people of the ‘flight’ and being accused of making an April fool's joke, thus, the date of the event was the 31st of March. One group of witnesses were school students, who had this discussion while riding their ponies to school. Three of these students stopped attending School in the months leading up to April 1903. Another group who watched the event from high ground were William Charles Bedford, his wife Mary, and her sister-in-law Mrs. Louise Johnson. William Bedford sold his farm in Waitohi in December 1903, and went to live in Apsley, Darfield, where he resided for the rest of his life. Mrs. Louise Johnson was one of the most alert witnesses with respect to how the plane behaved in the air. She recollected to interviewer George Bolt that the take off occurred long before she moved away from Waitohi in May 1904. With this and other evidence, Pearse historians generally agree that this take off likely occurred on 31 March 1903, with a less likely year of 1902, and could not have occurred in 1904. This is the only flight experiment witnessed by multiple people.

Preceding the Wright brothers powered flights, this was one of two aircraft which achieved a successful flight attempt, from level ground without the use of ramps, slopes, guiderails, or catapults. The other was Clément Ader of France, who in 1890 is given credit by aviation historians for achieving a flight distance of approximately 50 metres at an altitude of 20 centimetres.

==== 1903: Multi-lap Paddock Flight, Richard Pearse's Farm, Waitohi ====
John William Casey, born 1896, seven years old in 1903, recalled that soon after Pearse's first takeoff the news spread "that there was to be another free show", and on that day a crowd, which he roughly estimated to number about 30 people, gathered near Pearse's farm, the edge of which was only about 0.28 miles (450 m) from the school. Casey recalled that Miss Crowley let her students out of school to watch the event. According to Casey's account and estimations, after a short run of about 3 chains (60 m) Pearse's flying machine lifted off from an elevated part of the paddock, rose to about 60 feet (18 m) and, after flying two and a half circuits of the field, perhaps 1.5 miles (2.4 km), landed on the gorse hedge separating the corner paddock from his workshop paddock. He thought the event lasted about ten minutes. In a letter to Geoff Rodliffe, Casey described the flying machine as having a tricycle undercarriage supporting a wing about 5–6 feet (about 1.5–1.8 metres) above ground and provided an accurate drawing showing the points of takeoff and landing.

The flight had to have occurred before Miss Crowley left the district in September 1903. John Casey moved with his parents William and Margaret to the new Chamberlain settlement near Albury, some 25 miles (40 km) from Waitohi, in June 1904.

Casey believed that Pearse's brother, Warne, spun the propeller; however, Warne and others apparently never referred to such an impressive flight. Warne had pulled the propeller to start the engine on the previous flight run from the Upper Waitohi School. Casey also named five other people who may have witnessed the flight. Several independently recalled Miss Crowley as their teacher at that time, four described other flight attempts, and the fifth died before he could be interviewed.

If Casey's observations could be verified, this would be the first controlled flight in the world by a powered aeroplane.

==== 1903 April 11, Holy Saturday, Easter: The Terrace Flight, Opihi River, Waitohi ====
Robert Mitchell Gibson's accounts of a flight were considered by researchers to be amongst the most credible. Born 2 December 1895, he was 8 years old when his older brother Ramsay, age 13 years, took him on another cycle excursion, this time with a number of youths to help Pearse prove his flying machine.

Gibson recalled that Pearse had transported his flying machine with a dray and couple of horses from his shed to a terrace field above the Opihi River. On the first run, the flying machine headed down the hill and into a clump of gorse. After the boys had pulled the machine out and up the top to the dray, they and Pearse inspected the ground for half an hour in preparation for another run. The boys then headed Pearse and his flying machine on toward the cliff but after about 1 chain (20 m) they were left behind as the flying machine gathered speed by its own thrust. As the flying machine went over the cliff and into the air, the boys watched it turn and fly up the river up to 0.5 miles (800 m) gradually going downwards. They ran diagonally across the paddock to find a wet Pearse scrambling up the riverbank.

Gibson was certain the flight took place in the Easter school holidays before Easter, or Easter Saturday (11 April), 1903. He dates the flight as having occurred shortly before the severe snowstorm of 1903—the Big Snow. This was the only snow to fall from 1902 to 1905, and was responsible for the coldest temperature ever recorded in New Zealand and Oceania—minus 25.6˚C at Eweburn, Otago, on the morning of 17 July 1903. Gibson also dates the flight as occurring shortly after his brother Ramsey turned 14 in 1903. After his birthday, Ramsey immediately moved away from Waitohi to work. Ramsey never returned to Waitohi and died in 1908.

Gibson also served during the Great War, and recalled that he had been involved in a fight as a result of claiming that he had seen a New Zealander fly before the Wright Brothers. The Royal Navy consistently recorded Gibson's character as "VG".

Gibson's later attempts to identify the other youths present at the Opihi River terrace flight were not successful.

The descending upstream flight, as recalled, may be best described as a powered glide, though an engineer's calculation of the Opihi River site in the 1970s, based on local government survey data, plotted it as an "almost level flight" of just 3,300 feet (1,000 m) in length, from a terrace about 30 feet (9.1 m) above the riverbed, descending about 24.57 feet (7.49 m) to the river—an approximate grade of 1 in 134.

Arthur Tozer, who was about 17 years old at the time, recalled an event similar enough to be the same; that whilst driving a horse-drawn carriage through the Opihi riverbed he saw Pearse fly overhead but thought he had flown on to land on the terrace. Multiple independent hearsay accounts unrelated to Gibson's flight were made by several sources. Because of the multiple witness and hearsay accounts, it is considered hard to doubt that Pearse at some time made an attempt to fly off the Opihi River terrace.

==== 1903 May 2, Saturday: Paddock Flight, Richard Pearse's Farm, Waitohi ====
Alexander Amos Martin was sure in his accounts of the flight he had seen. He recalled that he was about 16 and a half years old when he saw one of Pearse's flights. Martin and his father had finished chaff cutting a stack of sheaves on Dick Connell's farm about 2:00 pm. From Upper Waitohi's main road he could see an odd contraption in Pearse's paddock. Pearse had pushed his bamboo plane out of his shed and after altering the steering, started the engine and taxied for about 50 yards (46 m). The plane then rose up into the air about 10 to 15 feet (3.0–4.6 metres) above ground, flew for about 50 yards (46 m) and crashed into a big gorse fence. "He could not go any higher because he had no more Power the engine was all out and the under carriage and wheels caught in the gorse fence." Martin took off on his bicycle and rode on after his father's chaff cutting plant.

Amos Martin stated that, "The time Pearse flew was on May 2nd 1903 at between half past two in the afternoon and four o'clock." "It was the year of the Big Snow." Writing to Joseph Coll on 23 May 1967, Martin said "I say this that it was Pay-day and Pay-day was the first Saturday of the month." He left Temuka for the coalmine at Nightcaps, Southland, in August 1903.

==== 1903: Paddock Flight, Richard Pearse's Farm, Waitohi ====
Daisy Moore Crawford (later Mrs. McLean), born 1892, recalled that she saw Pearse's flying machine in the air. She was with her father, William, who was a close friend of Pearse, on the hillside at the back of Pearse's farm. When interviewed by Anna Cotterill and filmed by Hutton for TV One News in 1976, she said: "I can remember it lifting up and coming down, and veering towards the road where there was a gorse fence, and landed on the gorse fence. And that gorse fence and the plane stuck in my mind, always!" Daisy did not think he had hurt himself but had landed with the cushion effect of the gorse hedge. When asked if there were a lot of people watching him, Daisy replied: "There was no one watching him! Well there was those girls up at the hill like, but, down, when you come down near the homestead, his own little cottage, on the right hand side, over, there was just himself and his plane. But I can remember there might have been somebody on the road, but I never saw anyone [watching him]." In a letter to Geoff Rodliffe dated 5 September 1976, Clifford Crawford, Daisy's brother, said Daisy was certain the event occurred on Tuesday, 31 March 1903.

==== 1903 April–May ====
Frank James Biggs of Taiko, born 28 September 1890, was educated at Fairview School, Fairview, Timaru, some 21 miles (34 km) from Waitohi, after the family moved there in 1898. He recalled his teacher at Fairview, Mrs. Christian Ritchie, telling the children that Pearse had flown. Writing to Joseph Coll on 25 May 1967, Frank Biggs said, "Now regarding the flight, I can remember it pretty clearly it would be late April or early May. Spud digging time. I think Mr. Martin as he witnessed the flight would be correct with his statement." Biggs thought the year to be between 1902 and 1904. Mrs. Ritchie, head teacher at Fairview School since 1894, retired from teaching in April 1906, and presented with gifts from her many friends and well wishers, left the settlement.

==== 1903 ====
Sisters, Annie Fraser (later Mrs. Casey) and Margaret Fraser (later Mrs. Esler), recalled that they were on a hill filling sacks of potatoes dug by David Stumbles, when they heard Pearse's flying machine in the distance. They piled up potatoes and threatened that if Pearse flew in their direction they would pelt him with spuds.

=== Experiments on aerial navigation ===
Pearse continued to develop the ability to achieve fully controlled flight. He incorporated small "ailerons". Diagrams and eyewitness recollections agree that Pearse placed controls for pitch and yaw at the trailing edge of the low-aspect-ratio kite-type permanently stalled wing. This control placement (located in turbulent air-flow, and close to the centre of gravity) would have had minimal, possibly inadequate, turning moment to control the pitch or yaw of the aircraft. The Wright brothers, in comparison, successfully applied the principles of airfoil wing-profile and three-axis control to produce fully controlled flight.

==== 1909 ====
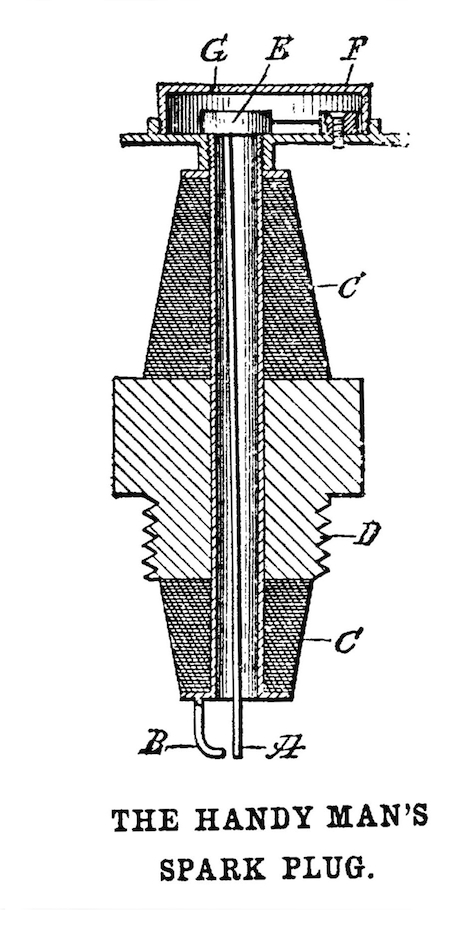
Pearse's spark plug, 1909

Pearse reappeared in the newspapers in late 1909 with his latest huge 700–900 sq ft. flying machine powered by a 24 horsepower motor. In a 1928 letter to The Star, Christchurch, Pearse summarised his progress in this particular "oval-shaped" monoplane:

At the trials it would start to rise off the ground when a speed of twenty miles an hour was attained. This speed was not sufficient to work the rudders, so, on account of its huge size and low speed, it was uncontrollable, and would spin round broadside on directly it left the ground. So I never flew with my first experimental 'plane, but no one else did with their first for that matter.

The Otago Witness, 1 December 1909, also observed that "Mr. Pearse has always been of an inventive turn of mind, as a visit to his workshop will show. Just lately the Scientific American printed an idea of his for an improved sparking plug for either high or low tension." Following many searches, researchers had doubts that this article existed, until it came to light during a search of Auckland Libraries’ bound volumes in 1999. R W Pearse's "The Handy Man's Spark Plug" was published in the 4 September 1909 issue of Scientific American, and again in Alexander Russell Bond's Handy Man's Workshop and Laboratory, a Scientific American Series publication, in 1910. Pearse's handy man's spark plug, having a wire within a central tube, utilised the pressure of the engine's compression stroke to operate a valve, to vibrate the connected terminal wire into contact the central tube's terminal, to produce multiple sparks.

Pearse's work was not clearly reported at the time; no contemporary newspaper accounts appear to exist of his earliest efforts. Pearse's own statements, interpreted though modern day lenses, have bamboozled many researchers, writers and critics. For many years such led the few who knew of his feats to accept 1904 as the date of flying. Unconcerned about posterity and in remote New Zealand, he received no public credit for his work during his lifetime. Pearse patented his design, but his innovations—such as ailerons and the lightweight air-cooled engine—did not succeed in influencing others.

=== Later activities ===
Pearse moved to Milton in Otago in about 1911 and discontinued his flying experiments due to the hillier country there. Much of his experimental equipment got dumped in a farm rubbish-pit. However, he continued experimenting and produced a number of inventions. He subsequently moved to Christchurch in the 1920s, where he built three houses and lived off the rentals.

Throughout the 1930s and 1940s, Pearse continued to work on constructing a tilt-rotor flying-machine for personal use – sometimes described as a cross between a windmill and a rubbish-cart. His design resembled an autogyro or helicopter, but involved a tilting propeller/rotor and monoplane wings, which, along with the tail, could fold to allow storage in a conventional garage. He intended the vehicle for driving on the road (like a car) as well for flying.

In 1951, aged 73 years, he was admitted to Sunnyside Hospital, Christchurch, diagnosed as suffering from arteriosclerotic psychosis, a common ailment among the elderly. He died there two years later. Researchers believe that many of his papers were destroyed at that time.

== Claims ==
The Public Trustee administered Pearse's estate following his death in 1953. The trust officer was instructed to place the properties and saleable articles up for auction and dump Pearse's patented convertiplane invention. Setting in motion a serendipitous train of events, the auctioneer George Anderson offered the convertiplane to the Canterbury Aero Club. Following inspection by the club's chief flying instructor, engineer and captain, their captain, Harry Walker, purchased it himself for £5 in June 1954 to save it from the scrap heap. They transported it to the club's hangar at Harewood, along with Pearse's powercycle as part of the lot. Intrigued by the shed find, Walker also rescued, examined and sorted what was left of Pearse's papers and patents from the trustee's rubbish heap and the yard. Sometime later, during a stopover at Christchurch Airport, Captain John Malcolm, NAC, caught sight of Pearse's dismantled convertiplane in the hangar, and reported the find to aviation pioneer George Bolt in Auckland. As a result, Bolt went to see Pearse's last flying machine during his next visit to Christchurch in March 1956. It is at this point that the tide turned for Richard William Pearse and his lifetime pursuit of aviation invention, from certain obliteration to recognition.

In 1958, Bolt excavated the South Canterbury dump site and discovered some components, including a propeller. His research in the 1950s and 1960s produced evidence for flight in 1903: people who had left the district by 1904 remembered the events, and recalled a particularly harsh winter with heavy snow.

During filming of a television documentary in the 1970s, the crew attached a replica of Pearse's 1902–03 machine by a rope to a horse. When the horse bolted, the pilotless machine took to the air and flew laterally stable for some considerable distance before landing clumsily with slight damage, surprising all and prompting an impression that it was flyable. Unfortunately, as the cameras had been put aside, the event went unfilmed.

== Uncertainty of flight experiment dates ==
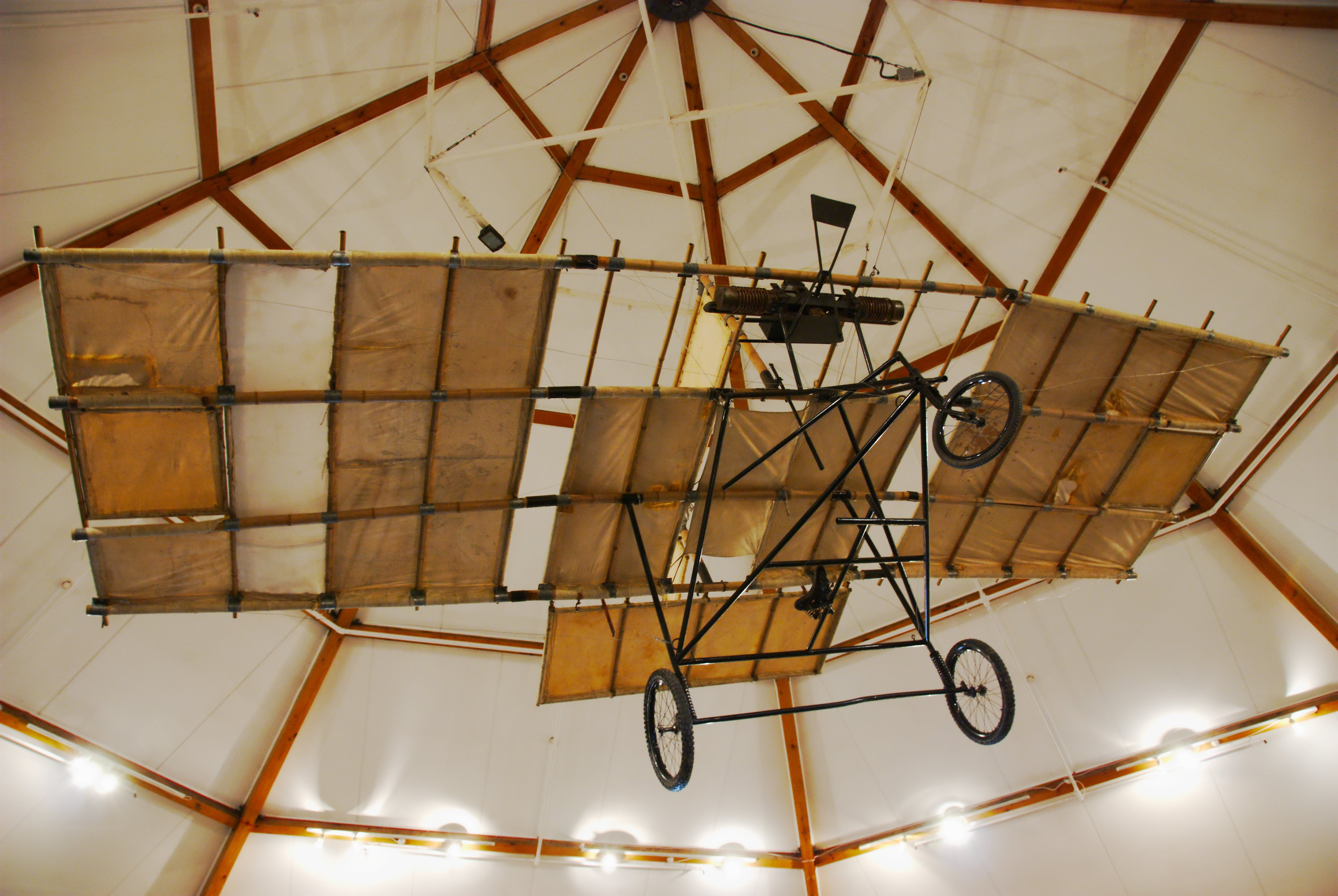
A representation of Pearse's early monoplane originally built for the 1977 New Zealand International Trade Fair, Auckland, on display at South Canterbury Museum, Timaru

In mid-1958, researcher George Bolt had tentatively concluded that all of his evidence showed that Pearse had conducted a public flight experiment on 31 March 1903, when two newspaper clippings had been found in the Pearse family album. The first clipping was a letter from Pearse that had been published in the press on 10 May 1915, stating that "After Langley's failure in 1903, I was still of the opinion that aerial navigation was possible, and I started out to solve the problem, about March, 1904. The Wright Brothers started at about the same time." The second letter to the press from Pearse was published on 15 September 1928, stating that "I started my experiments on aerial navigation about February, 1904, with a monoplane which I had designed and constructed." By writing these words Pearse became his own worst enemy because George Bolt took Pearse's remarks about starting his aviation experiments in early 1904 (after the Wright Brothers) at face value and no longer pursued his enquiries with the same degree of enthusiasm.

Later, with additional evidence, researchers recognised from the 1915 letter that Pearse regarded both his and the Wright Brothers early powered 'flights' as tentative efforts. They determined that the most likely reason for the difference between the 1903 witness testimonies and Pearse's own statements was that Pearse considered his 1902-1903 powered paddock hops and the publicly witnessed takeoff of 31 March 1903 to be insignificant early steps towards the more ambitious goal of achieving full navigational control in the air.

Historian Gordon Ogilvie writes in his biography of Richard Pearse that it is likely that the first publicly witnessed take off took place on 31 March 1903, and that Pearse had certainly achieved a number of tentative flights by 1909, but concludes that readers will need to make up their own minds. The Museum of Transport and Technology (MOTAT) in Auckland, finds 31 March 1903 to be the most likely date of Richard Pearse's first publicly witnessed powered take-off.

Some aviation historians cite Pearse's statement in a 17 November 1909 newspaper interview that he "did not attempt anything practical with the idea until, in 1904, the St. Louis Exposition authorities offered a prize" as evidence that Pearse did not begin the construction of an aircraft before 1904, thus disregarding Pearse's 1915 and 1928 statements. They also claim that the 1902-1903 witnesses are unnamed and did not remember events or dates accurately. This is despite, Gordon Ogilvie's book The Riddle of Richard Pearse recording no fewer than 48 named eyewitness accounts that were able to personally testify to witnessing Pearse's aircraft development and subsequent attempts at powered flight over the period 1902-1904. Some were able to date their testimony accurately based on public documents showing the date that they moved away from the Waitohi area. These witness testimonies are held in the Walsh Memorial Library in Auckland.

=== Question of flight ===
Ever since the first aviation experiments, the use of the term "flight" has often been contentious because it has no universally agreed definition. Researcher Geoff Rodliffe used the dictionary definition of the term to describe a powered flying machine being airborne for even a short time. Early aviators, such as the Wright brothers, viewed flight as being sustained, controlled and powered in a heavier-than-air flying machine to a predetermined location, or "aerial navigation". With regard to takeoff method—Wright biplane fixed to location by use of ground mounted launching rails, and assistance of a catapult; Pearse was more strict with his definition of flight, rejecting the use of a launching apparatus. His monoplane had a steerable pneumatic tyred tricycle undercarriage to "solve the problem of starting" flight. In 1915 Pearse wrote in a letter to a newspaper:

The honour of inventing the aeroplane cannot be assigned wholly to one man; like most inventions, it is the product of many minds. After all, there is nothing that succeeds like success, and for this reason, pre-eminence will undoubtedly be given to the Wright Brothers, of America, as they were the first to actually make successful flights with a motor-driven aeroplane. At most America can only claim to have originated the aeroplane. The honour of perfecting it and placing it on its present footing belongs to France.

Pearse summarises his achievements in a 1928 letter to a newspaper:

At the trials it would start to rise off the ground when a speed of twenty miles an hour was attained. This speed was not sufficient to work the rudders, so, on account of its huge size and low speed, it was uncontrollable, and would spin round broadside on directly it left the ground. So I never flew with my first experimental 'plane, but no one else did with their first for that matter.

From 1999, the Centennial of Flight (USA), Richard Pearse Centenary of Flight (NZ) and 100 Years of Flight (RAeS, UK), settled on 1903–2003 for the commemoration of those aeroplane pioneers in 2003.

== Legacy ==
At the dawn of the 20th century, a number of enthusiasts in several countries advanced towards powered heavier-than-air flight. Pearse, as one of several designers contemporary with the Wrights, advanced some distance towards controlled flight. However, Pearse's designs and achievements remained virtually unknown beyond the few who witnessed them and they had no impact on his contemporary aviation designers.

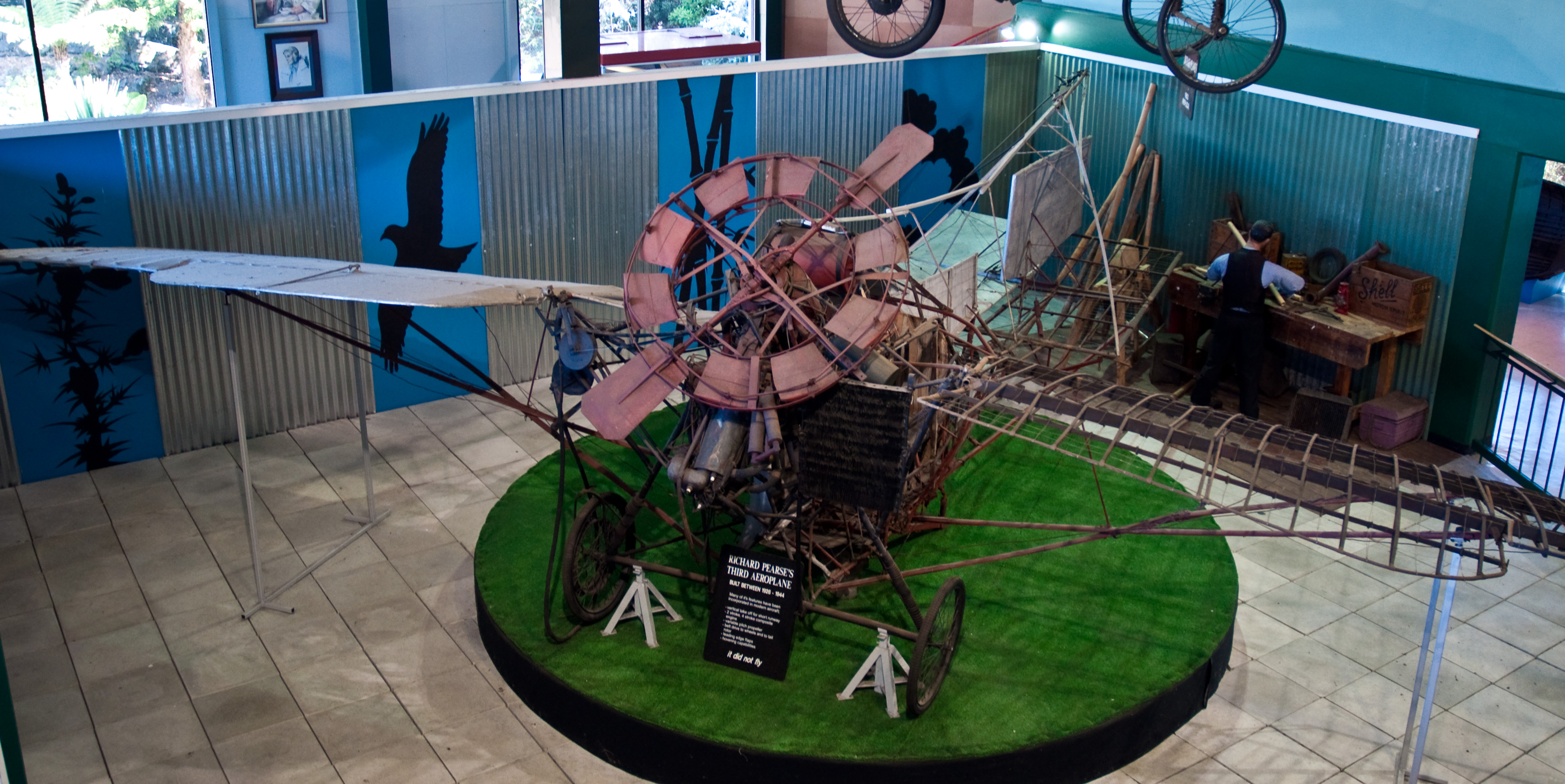
Pearse's tilt-rotor convertiplane as displayed at MOTAT in 2010

Museum of Transport and Technology (MOTAT) in Auckland holds Pearse's last aeroplane, a tilt-rotor convertiplane, his 25 hp four-cylinder engine and metal propeller from the later first flying machine, his powercycle and other original artefacts. The collection includes the flying machine created for the 1975 television docudrama Richard Pearse, based on Pearse's patent, witness descriptions and early 1900s technology.

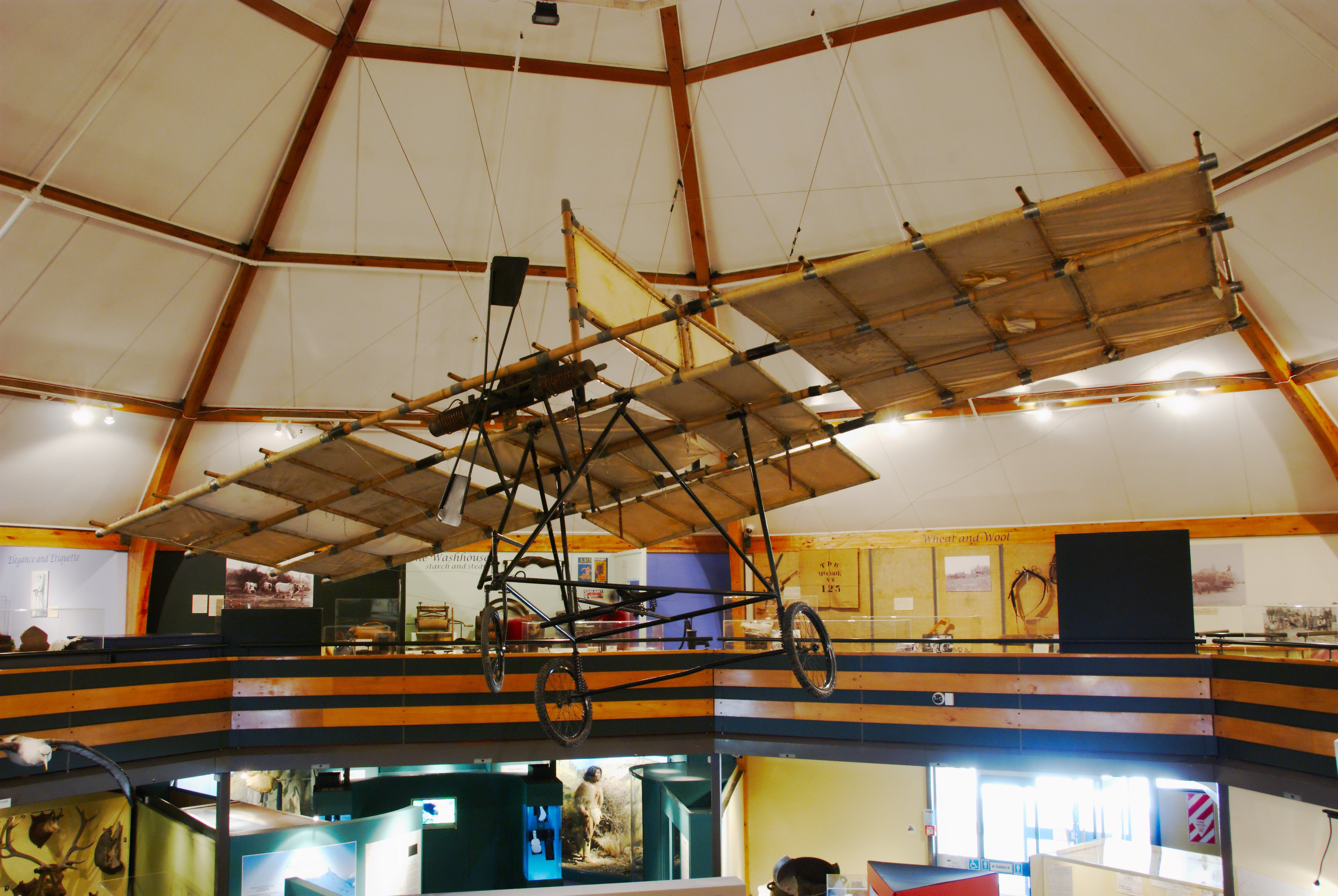
A representation of Pearse's early monoplane at the South Canterbury Museum

South Canterbury Museum in Timaru displays material relating to Pearse and to his contribution to early aviation.

Pleasant Point Museum and Railway in Pleasant Point displays original Pearse engine artefacts and other items.

South Canterbury Aviation Heritage Centre at Richard Pearse Airport, Timaru displays material relating to Pearse. The collection includes interpretations of Pearse's earliest flying machine constructed for the Richard Pearse Centenary of Flight 1903-2003 (MOTAT and South Canterbury Aviation Heritage Centre), for experiment and public display, along with several experimental two-cylinder engine reconstructions based on the remnants and descriptions of Richard Pearse's original engines.

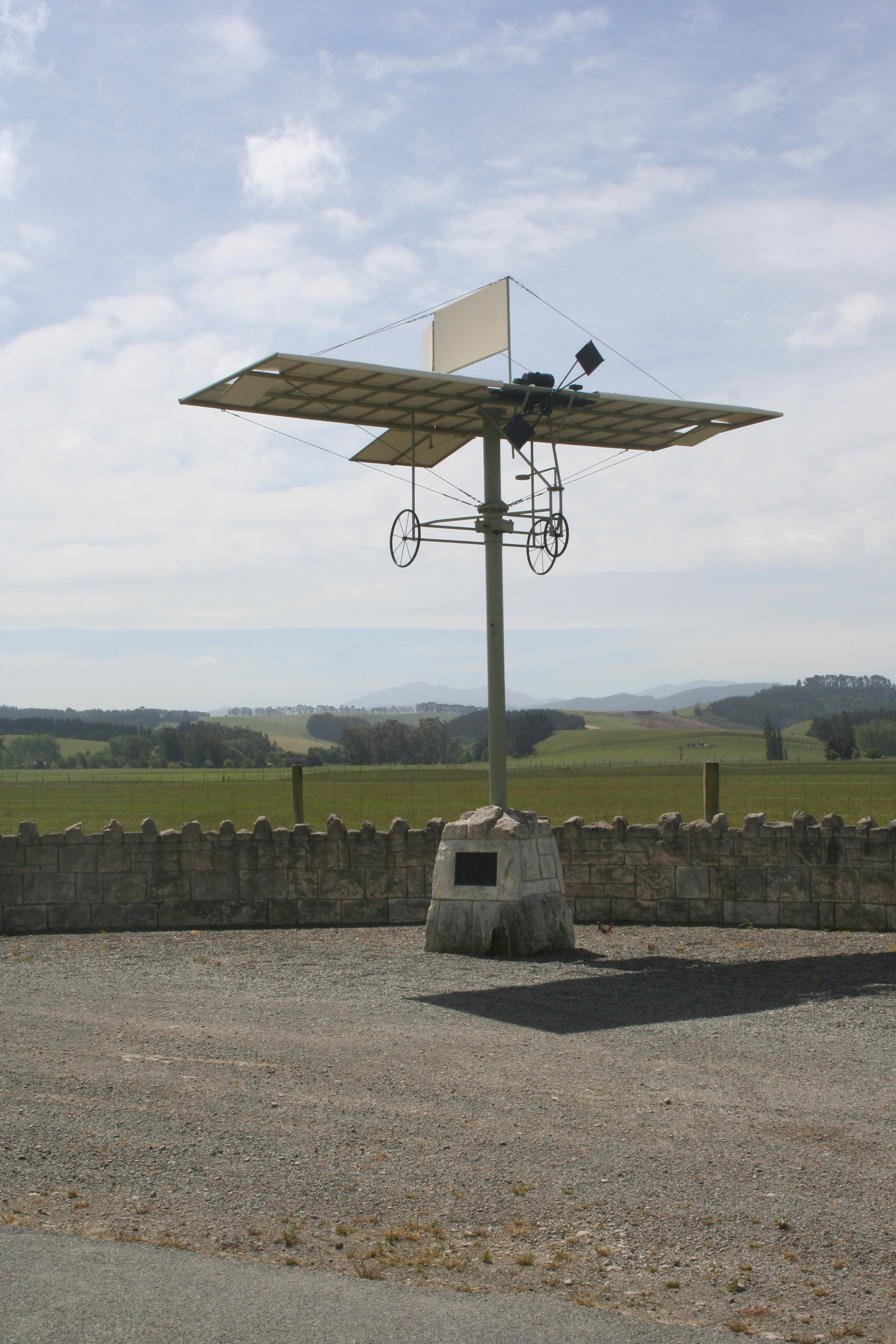
Richard Pearse Memorial, Waitohi, South Canterbury (44.20807°S 171.12303°E)

The Richard Pearse Memorial stands at Waitohi, South Canterbury, where Pearse made attempts at powered flight (44.20807°S 171.12303°E).

The South Island lakeside town of Wānaka has a line of tiles mounted on the sidewalk by the lake listing important historic world and New Zealand events. The 1903 tile says that the first powered flight in history occurred in Timaru, and at the bottom of the tile for 1903 the Wright Brothers were listed as having also flown that year. Millennium path tiles were removed in 2019 in preparation for future lake shore redevelopment.

== Popular culture ==
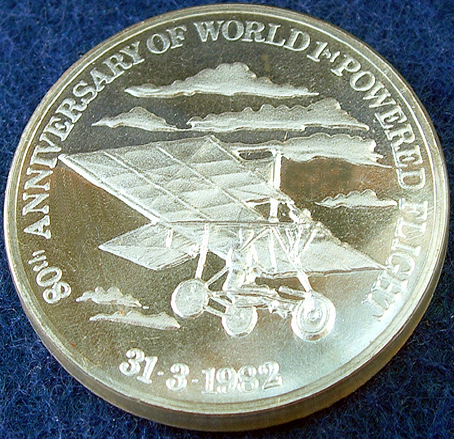
A silver medal struck by the New Zealand Mint for the New Zealand Museum of Transport and Technology in 1982 to commemorate the "80th Anniversary of World 1st Powered Flight" by Pearse. MOTAT's website gives 1903 as the year of his first flight, not 1902 as indicated on the medal.

The arts have commemorated Richard Pearse's remarkable achievements over the years.

=== Poetry ===
- Solo Flight (1982) by William (Bill) Sewell. A series of meditations about the South Canterbury aviator Richard Pearse. ISBN 0908569289.
- 'Richard Pearse (1877-1953)' by Geoff Barlow. An elegy by an Auckland poet in the periodical Scriptio: Auckland Chevron Poets, c2000s.
- 'Brief Note for Richard Pearse' by Simon Williamson. Short poem by a Wellington poet in the book Storyteller (HeadworX Publishers, 2002).

=== Plays ===
- The Pain and the Passion (2000) by Sherry Ede. Performed at the Rose Centre Theatre, Belmont, Auckland, by Company Theatre, 10–24 June 2000; MOTAT, Auckland, for the Richard Pearse Centenary of Flight 1903–2003, 2003. Director: Sherry Ede; and Canterbury Repertory Theatre, Christchurch, 31 March–12 April 2003, for the Richard Pearse Centenary of Flight 1903–2003. Director: Penny Giddens.
- Too High the Son (1996) by Stephen Bain and France Hervé. Performed at City Gallery, Wellington; Downstage Theatre, Wellington; Maidment Theatre, Auckland.
- Jean and Richard (1990) by Mervyn Thompson. A fantasy in which Jean Batten and Richard Pearse meet in the afterlife. Performed by the Court Theatre, Christchurch, 1990.
- Pearse (1981) by John Leask. Performed by the Little Theatre Section, South Canterbury Drama League, 1981. Director: Dawn Somerville; and by the Little Theatre Section, Timaru, for the Richard Pearse Centenary of Flight 1903–2003, 2003.

=== Film and television ===
- A Century of Flight: A Tribute to Richard William Pearse (2003). Documentary by Bob Jessopp, Horizon Video Communications. MOTAT, Auckland. An overview of the Richard Pearse Centenary of Flight 1903–2003.
- Forgotten Silver (1995). Mockumentary by filmmakers Costa Botes and Peter Jackson. Purports to uncover a long-lost segment of motion picture film that, with digital enhancement of a newspaper seen in one shot, "proves" that Pearse successfully flew in March 1903, predating the Wrights' achievement by several months.
- The New Adventures of Black Beauty: The Birdman (1990). Isambard Productions' continuation of the 1970s UK television series. A young inventor attempts to fly in a Richard Pearse-like contraption.
- Off the Ground – 1: The First to Fly (1982). Documentary by the National Film Unit. Richard Pearse leads off a three-part series on the history of aviation in New Zealand.
- Richard Pearse (1975). Docudrama, New Zealand Television One (NZBC). Set during his first flying machine efforts, the film focuses on Pearse's reclusive manner and local perceptions of his eccentric activities.

=== Novels, novellas, and short stories ===
- Oh, for the Wings of a Moth (1999) by Helene Moore and Geoff Rodliffe. An historical novel woven around the life of Richard Pearse.
- The Red Menace (1999-2002). An eight-part Doctor Who/The War of the Worlds crossover fan fiction novella by Jeff Stone published in the New Zealand Doctor Who fanzine Reverse the Polarity!, nos 6–13, January 1999–November 2002, extensively features Pearse as the co-creator of flying machines used to battle the returning Martian invaders. The unpublished extended version features material outlining Pearse's lonely journey to Britain to try to interest businessmen in his "aero-nautical device" designs.

=== Music ===
- To the Sky composed by Dwayne Bloomfield—Assistant Bandmaster, New Zealand Army Band, and Musical Director, Timaru Municipal Band. Performed by massed bands directed by Dwayne Bloomfield at the Richard Pearse Centenary Concert, Theatre Royal, Timaru, 29 March 2003.
- I Can Fly in the Dark composed by Natasha Murphy. Performed at the Richard Pearse Centenary Concert, Theatre Royal, Timaru, 29 March 2003.
- He Flys composed by Dave Denize. A ballad performed by Dave Denize at the Richard Pearse Centenary Concert, Theatre Royal, Timaru, 29 March 2003.

== See also ==
- List of firsts in aviation
- Harry Houdini: The Aviator — Houdini's flight at Diggers Rest, Friday, 18 March 1910.

== Bibliography ==
- Heath, Philip (Winter 2012). "Easy Flyer: Richard Pearse's 1912-13 Powercycle". The Driving Wheel (3). Auckland: The Museum of Transport and Technology Society (MOTAT Society): 35–42.
- Jarrett, Philip (Winter 2003). "The Pearse Aeroplane". Prop-Swing: Journal of the Shuttleworth Veteran Aeroplane Society: 25–31.
- Martyn, Errol W. (2012). A Passion for Flight: New Zealand Aviation Before the Great War. Volume One: Ideas, First Flight Attempts and the Aeronauts 1868-1909. Christchurch: Volplane Press. ISBN 9780473203870.
- Moore, Dave (2007). Who was Richard William Pearse, 1877 to 1953: Aviation Pioneer. Nottingham, UK: D. Moore. ISBN 9780954745417.
- Moore, Helene; Rodliffe, Geoffrey (1999). Oh, For the Wings of a Moth. Auckland: C.G. Rodliffe. ISBN 0473057727.
- Ogilvie, Gordon (1973). The Riddle of Richard Pearse (1 ed.). Wellington: A.W. & A.H. Reed. ISBN 0589007947.
- Ogilvie, Gordon (1994). The Riddle of Richard Pearse: The Story of New Zealand's Pioneer Aviator and Inventor (Revised ed.). Auckland: Reed Publishing.
- Ogilvie, Gordon (2003). The Riddle of Richard Pearse: The Story of New Zealand's Pioneer Aviator and Inventor. Auckland: Reed. ISBN 0790003295.
- Riley, Bob (1995). Kiwi Ingenuity: A Book of New Zealand Ideas and Inventions. Auckland: AIT Press. ISBN 9780958333443.
- Rodliffe, C. Geoffrey (1997). Flight over Waitohi. Auckland: C.G. Rodliffe. ISBN 9780473050481.
- Rodliffe, C. Geoffrey (2007). Richard Pearse and His Flying Machines: An Anthology of Research Notes, Essays and Ideas (1 ed.). Auckland: C.G. Rodliffe. ISBN 9780473123628.
- Rodliffe, C. Geoffrey (1978). Richard Pearse: Pioneer Aviator (1 ed.). Auckland: Walsh Memorial Library of the Museum of Transport and Technology.
- Rodliffe, C. Geoffrey (1983). Richard Pearse: Pioneer Aviator. Auckland: Museum of Transport and Technology, and Richard Pearse Memorial Committee.
- Rodliffe, C. Geoffrey (2003). Richard Pearse: Pioneer Aviator (4 ed.). Thornbury, UK: C.G. Rodliffe. ISBN 9780473096861.
- Rodliffe, C. Geoffrey (1993). Wings Over Waitohi: The Story of Richard Pearse (1 ed.). Auckland: Avon Press. ISBN 9780473020941.
- Rodliffe, C. Geoffrey (1997). Wings Over Waitohi: The Story of Richard Pearse (2 ed.). Auckland: C.G. Rodliffe. ISBN 9780473050009.
- Tonkin, Keith (2003). Four Great New Zealand Inventors. Wellington: Gilt Edge Publishing. ISBN 9780473088125.
- Williams, Tony (2006). 101 Ingenious Kiwis: How New Zealanders Changed the World. Auckland: Reed New Zealand. ISBN 9780790011103.
- Yarwood, Vaughan (October–December 1999). "The Birdman of Upper Waitohi". New Zealand Geographic. No. 44. Auckland: Australian Consolidated Press New Zealand. pp. 110–127.
- Yarwood, Vaughan (2002). The History Makers: Adventures in New Zealand Biography. Auckland: Random House. ISBN 9781869415419.
