= Horace Fildes =

Horace Edward Manners Fildes (5 October 1875–7 October 1937) was a New Zealand postmaster, book collector and bibliographer. He was born in Temuka, South Canterbury, New Zealand on 5 October 1875.

Fildes bequeathed nearly 2,000 volumes to the Victoria University College Library, which provided the basis of the New Zealand research materials in the J.C. Beaglehole Room.
