= Ian Johnstone (broadcaster) =

New Zealand journalist

Ian Johnstone QSO
- Born: Ian Anthony Johnstone; 1935 (age 90–91); Longtown, Cumberland, England
- Education: Durham University
- Occupations: Television presenter; journalist

Ian Anthony Johnstone QSO (born 1935) is a New Zealand broadcaster, presenter and journalist.

== Early life ==
Johnstone was born in Longtown, Cumberland, England, in 1935, and studied English at Durham University (St Chad's College). He moved to New Zealand in 1961 after working in Britain and spending three years as a colonial administrator in Northern Rhodesia (now Zambia).

== Career ==
In his early career in New Zealand, Johnstone was a teacher at Temuka District High School (now Opihi College), and worked part-time as an announcer at Radio 3XC in Timaru.

Johnstone was an interviewer for the weekly television programme, Close Up, and became a reporter and producer for Compass, which aired from 1964 to 1969. He was also notable for being a presenter for the New Zealand Telethon from 1975 until 1993. Throughout the 1980s and 1990s, Johnstone continued to work on various New Zealand-produced television shows as a presenter or narrator.

In the 1990 New Year Honours, Johnstone was appointed a Companion of the Queen's Service Order, for public services.

Johnstone's book, Stand and Deliver, giving his personal view of broadcasting in New Zealand, was published in 1998.

== Personal life ==
Johnstone is married with four children.
