= Frederick Dennison =

New Zealand engineer (1876–1960)

Frederick Ridley Dennison (1876–1960) was an Oamaru mechanical engineer who designed and built New Zealand's first indigenous motor car in 1900 and first bus in 1906.

== Background ==
Dennison was born Hilderthorpe on 2 January 1876. His father was a blacksmith and his mother the local post mistress. He was educated at Pukeuri. He moved to Christchurch and was employed working as a mechanical engineer.

== Motor vehicles ==
In the 1890s, while working as a cycle mechanic and engineer, he became interested in motor vehicles and began designing his own, including its engine. His first recorded motor vehicle, May 1900, was a petrol engined three wheeler. He stated at the time that he intended to use the engine in his first car.

Dennison designed and made the car by June 1900. He drove the car from Christchurch to Oamaru on a proving run in June 1900. It attained a top speed of 15 miles per hour under favourable circumstances. The journey, which now takes about two hours, took five days with rivers to ford, numerous mechanical failures, and very poor roads. Unfortunately on the return journey the car exploded and was destroyed by the ensuing fire. Dennison was unharmed but lost his luggage.

On his journey to Oamaru he was shown a three-wheel vehicle in Timaru by its maker Cecil Walkden Wood. Whether this vehicle pre-dated Dennison's and was a motor car is the subject of unresolved ongoing debate. Wood's endeavours were well covered in Timaru newspapers of the time and they stated that his first three-wheel vehicle ran a year later in 1901.

There is no record of any further self-designed cars by Dennison. In 1904 he assembled a Ford Model B with the Papakaio village smith's assistant, Donald A Whyte and in 1906 began importing and assembling Fords. His also made at least one bus, only the body and tyres were made by others. The bus was sold to W Fewings of Waikaia for the Waikaia to Riversdale run. Although delivered by Dennison in May it took till September to commence the bus service. The reasons for the delay were not stated.

== Motorcycle racing ==
In October 1900, Dennison returned to Oamaru and commenced running a bicycle and motor car assembly business in the Waitaki Buildings, Thames Street. His bicycle brand was called Torpedo. By September 1901, he moved to larger premises and was selling motors which could be attached to his bicycles. He also held an agency for Massey-Harris bicycles. In March 1903, Dennison was reported as participating in what may have been one of New Zealand's first motor cycle races. Dennison, riding a Torpedo, finished third out of the four bikes that participated in his heat. The winning bike was a Mitchell, followed by a Clément-Garrard, then Dennison's Torpedo and last was a French. Dennison also raced the Torpedo at Dunedin in December of that year, but it was described as being not in it for pace. At some time in late 1902, Dennison sold his business to Herman House and Co Ltd. In May 1904 Dennison reacquired the business from House and Co. In September 1904, Dennison sold his cycle business to Miller Brothers.

== Inventions ==
Dennison was also an inventor who applied for and held patents for various inventions relating to vehicles and their engines. In May 1904 Dennison patented a machine to separate wild oats from good oats.

== Bus ==
By 1906 Dennison was in business in Itchen Street, Oamaru. The North Otago Daily Times reported that Dennison had made New Zealand's first bus. They inspected it on 8 March 1906 and it was intended for use by W Ewings of Waikaia, Southland for a route between Waikaia and Riversdale. The bus was described as having a 23 hp engine, with a Dennison made three speed gear box. Top speed was 18 mph. Because of the rough terrain the bus was intended to go through, it was built so the engine could get through water 2.5 feet deep. Coachwork was done by a Mr Cunningham of Oamaru. The bus was designed to carry 12 passengers and a driver.

== Ford agent ==
His advertisements in 1907 stated that he was agent for Royal Enfield, BSA, and Edlin-Sinclair bicycles as well as Ford, Darracq, De Dion, and Rover automobiles. He also moved his business to 8 Tyne Street, separating his garage from his cycle business in adjoining premises.

In 1908 Dennison was appointed Ford agent for Otago and South Canterbury by their Australasian representative Gordon M McGregor. By 1909 Dennison was an agent for Mass, Gregoire, Napier, Siddeley, Rover, Austin, Lorraine-Dietricht, Talbot, Ford, Buick, Delauney-Bellville, Humber, Singer, Vauxhall, and Vulcan. He was also agent for Excelsior, LMC, and Triumph motor cycles and McIntyre motor buggies. In 1910 Dennison went to America and Europe, returning in 1911 after having visited numerous trade exhibitions. In 1913 he opened a new garage in Queen Street, Waimate and was predominantly selling Model T Ford's.

When World War One broke out Henry Ford opposed war, which he viewed as a terrible waste. Ford became highly critical of those who he felt financed war, and he tried to stop them. In 1915, the pacifist Rosika Schwimmer gained favour with Ford, who agreed to fund a Peace Ship to Europe, where World War I was raging. He and about 170 other prominent peace leaders traveled there. Ford's Episcopalian pastor, Reverend Samuel S. Marquis, accompanied him on the mission. Marquis headed Ford's Sociology Department from 1913 to 1921. Ford talked to President Wilson about the mission but had no government support. His group went to neutral Sweden and the Netherlands to meet with peace activists. A target of much ridicule, Ford left the ship as soon as it reached Sweden.

Ford's stance caused problems for Dennison, as a Ford dealer. The controversy peaked in New Zealand in February 1916 with press statements noting that the Defence Department had decided not to purchase of Ford's cars. Once the cars were determined to have been manufactured in Canada and not the United States an apology was published in the Oamaru Mail.

== Tank ==
In October 1918 there was a fund raising parade in Oamaru. As part of the parade Dennison along with David Sinclair made a mock-up of a tank on a truck chassis. The local paper described it as a very credible replica.

== Later life ==
In 1920 Dennison first moved to Dunedin and then in 1925 to Timaru where he started a new business, Dennison & Shipley Ltd at 55 Sophia Street. The company was the district agent for Commerce trucks. The company became South Canterbury Motors and remained in business until 1931. Dennison moved to Christchurch in 1940.

Dennison died in 1960.

== Replicar ==
In 2000 a replica of Dennison's vehicle was constructed in Christchurch and his route retraced. The book Replicar outlines the story of its construction and journey.
