= Cecil Wood (engineer) =

New Zealand engineer

Cecil Walkden Wood
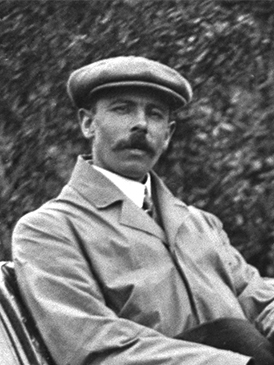
- Cecil Wood, c. 1910
- Born: 28 March 1874; Timaru
- Died: 21 June 1965 (aged 91); The Grange, Timaru
- Burial place: Timaru Cemetery
- Education: Lyttelton and Christchurch

Cecil Walkden Wood (1874 – 1965) was a New Zealand engineer from Timaru who made New Zealand's first motorcycle in 1901 and second known indigenous motor car in 1902. He also instructed Richard Pearse on making an engine for his flying machine in 1901 and 1902.

== Early life ==
Wood was born in Timaru on 28 March 1874, the son of Charles Walkden Wood. Educated in Lyttelton, he first worked as a mechanical engineer at Lyttelton, and then became involved in the cycle trade in Christchurch. He married Edith Susan Harris, a daughter of Thomas Harris of Timaru, in September 1899, and they had one son.

== Tourist Cycle Works, C. W. Wood and Co. ==
Cecil Wood and James Gibson opened their Timaru cycle business, Gibson, Wood and Co., on 8 April 1894; the first cycle shop in town. Charles Macintosh and John James Grandi, coachbuilder, soon joined the partnership. Wood carried on the firm as Tourist Cycle Works, C. W. Wood and Co., when Gibson left the partnership to establish Reliance Cycle Works in May 1896.

The firm carried on the sale of imported and Tourist manufactured cycles, as well as servicing cycles, claiming to have made the first tandem and first chainless cycles in the colony.

=== Motor vehicles ===
==== Experimental ====
In odd moments, Wood would turn his attention to making internal combustion engines and motor vehicles. By his accounts, a vehicle was first on the road as a skeleton in 1895 and run with two people in 1896.

The first engine was fuelled by gunpowder; the dry chemical compound made by William Gunn, a local chemist. The ignition system was a hot tube—1/8" gas tube standing upright connected to the engine and heated by a little Bunsen burner. The compression stroke fired the charge up the tube and ignited the vapour. If the flywheel wasn't turning when starting, combustion would blow the hot tubes out. The burner was also difficult to keep steady in the wind. Whilst the engine provided propulsion, the necessary clearance of residue from the cylinders after about six firing strokes made it troublesome, and accordingly this engine type was abandoned.

Wood turned to liquid fuel and ventured to Dunedin by train to buy a bottle of volatile gasoline for a second engine, which in turn required him to devise a surface carburettor. The hydrocarbon engine propelled the vehicle a distance of about 100 yards, in its first time on the road, early in 1897. By his and later published accounts, the vehicle was running on 22 November 1897. He described it as a motorcycle with another bicycle brazed to it to form a quadricycle. "Many things were wrong", but despite these, being called a "crank" and made the subject of jokes, Wood and Charlie Brehaut persisted in experimenting away from public gaze until finally, in late 1898 and early 1899, Wood was able to let the people see it.

Complaints to the Police in relation to speed, and frightening animals and children, had driven Wood to discover Station Street, owned by the New Zealand Railways, which then became his testing ground. It appears that Sergeant Major McDonald, in charge of the Police force in South Canterbury from 1891 to 1897, had hinted to Wood that Station Street did not come under the borough bylaws and that if he pushed his car there, he could test it without interference.

The invention of electrical ignition resolved the ignition problem but short of the latest knowledge, Wood had difficulty in making batteries, accumulators and coil for his first motor-cycle engine. Consequently, he placed his resources at the disposal of two apprentices—Sydney Smith and Charlie Brehaut—who entered into the spirit of the venture to make the equipment with him. Fred Smith also offered valuable help in that direction. When mastered, Wood successfully attached the motor to a cycle and placed it on the road on 20 May 1900.

In the 1920s, Wood recalled, seemingly in relation to proving his early vehicles, walking long distances along quiet dusty country roads with a broken-down motor, and on one occasion burrowing into a haystack, some 20 miles from town, to sleep for the night.

==== Motor tricycle ====
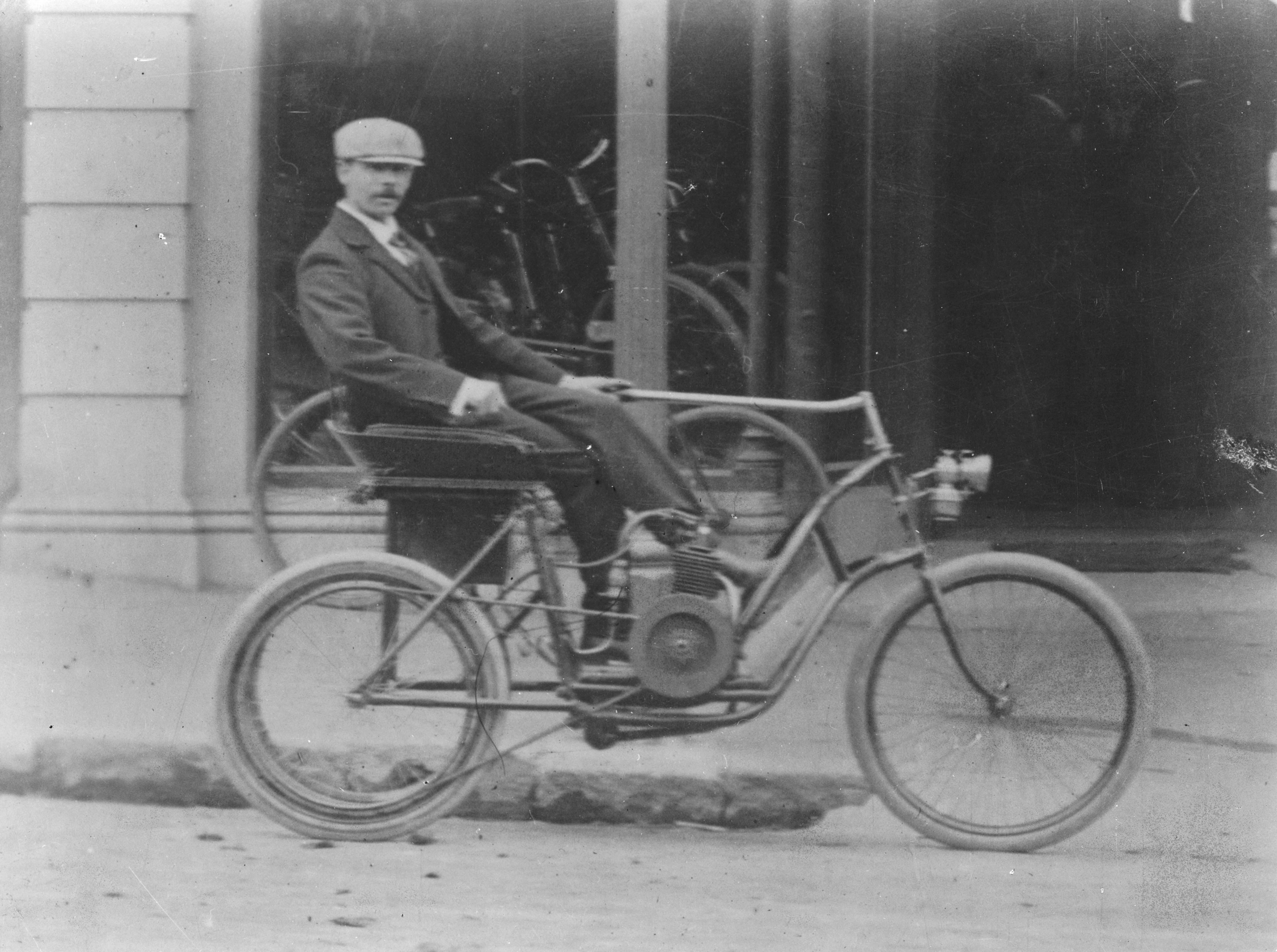
Wood in his motor tricycle outside Tourist Cycle Works, Stafford Street, Timaru

Frederick Dennison is asserted to have made the first motor car in New Zealand. It was observed on the road as a three-wheeler in May 1900. Completed with four wheels, Dennison then drove it on a five-day proving run between Christchurch and Oamaru in June 1900. Wood's advertisement in the 1924 Diamond Jubilee issue of the Timaru Herald dated his motor tricycle as having been built and run in Timaru in 1898–99. In 1938 Dennison said that, when he passed through Timaru, on or about 19 June 1900, "C. W. Wood located him and took him to see his first car, which he was then building, and which could not have been on the road running under its own power for some considerable time after that date." Since then, the question as to who was first has centred on these two vehicles; though Wood's 1890s motor vehicle development work, ultimately formed up as the motor tricycle, asserted 1895 skeleton, 1896 run with two people, 1897 run-on-road and 1898–1899 rebuild dates.

In November 1900, Nicholas Oates of Zealandia Cycle Works, Oates, Lowry and Co., Christchurch, appeared in Timaru with another "first" motor car. Purchased in Coventry and imported that year, it was a three-seater powered by a small petroline engine, where the fuel was vaporised by heat from the engine and ignited electric sparks provided by a battery. In Auckland, Arthur Marychurch, who'd experimented with a flying machine at Waotu, Waikato, in 1893, had imported another "first", a Star motor car from Wolverhampton, England, in 1900. However, William McLean, politician, had imported two Benz automobiles from Paris in 1898, leading to the creation of the McLean Motor-car Act, 1898. Robert Julian Scott of Christchurch, a cousin of Robert Falcon Scott, RN, had preceded them with his motor wagonette design, a 3 hp steam-powered buggy for 10 passengers, built by Messrs Cutton and Co. of Dunedin, in 1880–81 and exhibited at the New Zealand International Exhibition, Christchurch, in 1882.

Wood appears to have started constructing the tiller-steered two-seater motor tricycle following completion of his motorcycle engine and its successful attachment to a cycle in 1900. The frame was made from 1¼ inch cycle tube; the engine parts were cast by Storier, iron founder, of Timaru. The first motor car made in the country to carry two people, this particular form was said to have been first run on the road on 4 June 1901. Cecil Wood and his staff had continued with engine development, displaying their latest gas engine to the public in the Tourist Cycle Works' shop window on 29 July 1901. The neatly made engine stood about 14 inches high by 19 inches long, including a 14-inch flywheel. With a 2-inch bore and 4 inch stroke it had been run to 800 rpm but was capable of up to 1000 rpm. The engine attracted a large crowd.

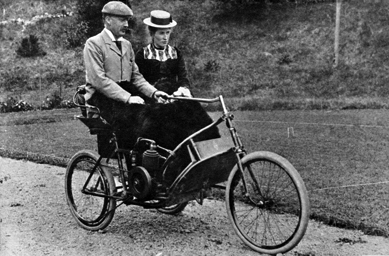
Howard and Ruby Tripp of Orari Gorge Station with Wood's motor tricycle, 1903

By 10 December 1902, apart from finishing touches and seat upholstery, he had completed and road tested the 3½ hp motor tricycle, and given experimental rides about the streets to several people. Howard and Ruby Tripp of Orari Gorge Station acquired the tiller-steered two-seater motor tricycle in 1903. Their first jaunt in the machine, from Timaru to Orari Gorge at 10 mph, covering 34 miles (54.3 km) with some mishaps along the way, took three days.

In later years, Wood told George Bolt and Harold Cederman that he had instructed Richard Pearse on making engines during this period, in 1901 and 1902. He recalled showing Pearse how to make spark plugs with a central electrode wrapped in mica and helping with surface carburetor design. Pearse also adopted the sulky tiller-steered tricycle form for his flying machine undercarriage.

==== Motor cycles ====
During public display of the gas engine in July 1901, Wood made it known that he intended to build another engine for attachment to a bicycle and promised that "at no very distant date a 'motor cycle' will be seen on our streets."

Charles Jessep and Raymond Every, having established the Stella Cycle Works, C. T. Jessep and Co., at Temuka, 11 miles from Timaru, in July 1899, preceded Wood in producing the first practical New Zealand built motor bicycle, and had, from October 1901, placed it on the road and track. The Stella motor bicycle, though, was powered by a specially imported 1¼ hp Minerva cycle engine.

Wood completed manufacture of Tourist's first motor bicycle product by December 1901; its 1¼ hp Otto engine made by his firm from rough parts, he believed, was the first of such manufacture in the colony. The 20 lb motor was mounted in the main frame, in the angle between the saddle tube and bottom tube, the fuel tank hung from the top tube just in front of the saddle tube and the accumulator and spark coil just behind that tube. Designed to drive the cycle from 3 to 30 mph, its fuel capacity was sufficient for a 100-mile run at a cost of a farthing per 12 miles. A slight twist to the left handle-grip would start and stop the motor. It had a free wheel, back-pedal brake and, if required, the reversing gear could be made to act as a brake. It went on public display in Tourist Cycle Works' shop window on 11 December 1901 to much interest, though days sooner had the imported ignition coil not been defective.

Every, with his Stella motor bicycle, and Wood, with his Tourist motor bicycle, made-several appearances on track, separately and together, at the annual South Canterbury Caledonian Society sports gathering on 1 January 1902. Every's cycle ran easy without trouble. Wood's cycle didn't go well, seemed sluggish and inclined to jib, owing, he thought, to a mistake in using mixed oil. Wood ran the motor bicycle again on the following sports day, more satisfactorily than the previous experience. "He ran three quarter-mile laps against the watch. The first lap was done in 47 or 48, two in 97; the third (slowing up at the end) in 67 seconds."

The new 1902 model, the third of six motor bicycle orders, built with BSA cycle fittings and a 1½ hp Minerva cycle engine mounted within, was first ridden on the road by its owner, W J Huggins of Timaru, on Thursday, 17 April 1902, up to 25 mph. It was fitted with: strengthened front forks; one gallon fuel tank sufficient for a careful 150 miles at average speed of 15 mph; rechargeable 4 V accumulator sufficient for 500 miles; handbrake and powerful back-pedal brake for stopping within 5 yards.

==== Motor cars ====
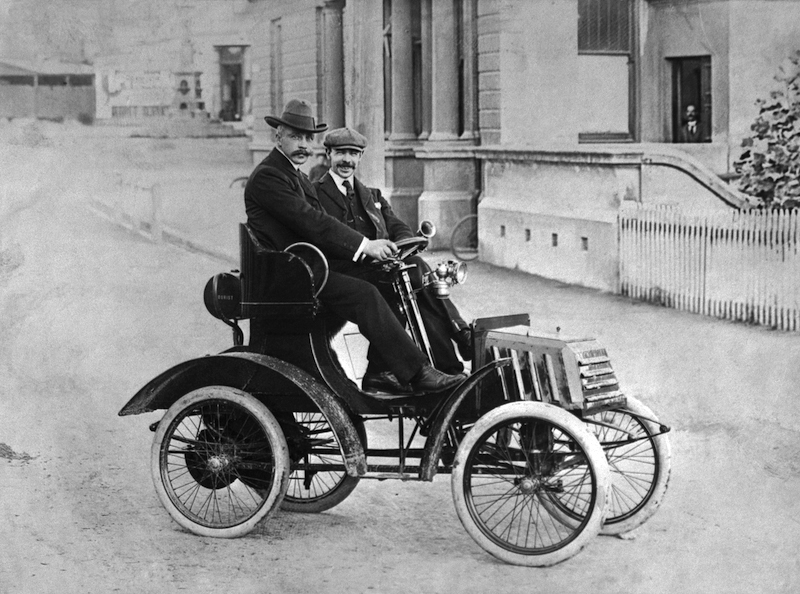
Timaru Postmaster (driver) and Cecil Wood seated in the Tourist motor car in Sophia Street, Timaru, alongside the Central Post Office, looking towards George Street and the Queen's Jubilee Fountain, 1902–03

Including the motor tricycle, Wood manufactured four motor cars; two of which were running about Timaru streets in 1903.

Wood completed building a four-wheel, two-seater car with rear mounted motor and a half speed gear for hill climbing in early 1903. The 4 hp engine was set to run at 15 mph on the level. The body was built by coachbuilder John James Grandi and hand-painted to quality finish in a chocolate colour with black lining, the seat and back cushioned with horsehair in brown American leather; wide wooden mudguards made and bent by John Jackson and Co. A neat rear mounted cylinder and branded "Tourist", contained three vessels: a large one for cooling water and others for petrol and lubricating oil. The accumulator, coil and storage space were enclosed below the seat. Extra storage was located at the front, under the bonnet. The 25 x 3 inch pneumatic tyres were specially made by the Dunlop Rubber Company and ironwork was carried out by J. C. Trengrove.

With one of his assistants, Wood drove the car out to Temuka on 13 April 1903, for the fifth annual Temuka Bicycle Club meeting at Victoria Park. Later in the day he drove it on the track and carried the club president, Thomas Gunnion, twice round the circuit. In May 1903, William Ferrier exhibited, in his Stafford Street photographic studio window, a hand water-coloured photograph of "Mr C. W. Wood's cottage, with Mr Wood at the gate in his motor car."

=== Tourist's end ===
Tourist Cycle Works, C. W. Wood and Co., came to an end through bankruptcy from 7 September 1903. Macintosh had left the partnership in 1898 or 1899 and Grandi on 14 July 1903. Wood's cycle works' stock, plant and fittings, consisting of bicycles, frames, parts and fittings of all kinds, tools, Tangye oil engine, dynamo and electric lighting plant wires and switch board, pulleys, shafting, belting, lathes and sundries specially suitable for the trade, were put up for auction on 2 October.

== Speedwell Cycle Works, W. A. Scott ==
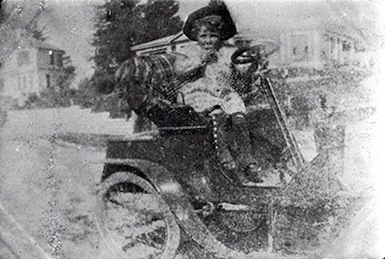
Cecil Wood's son seated in the third motor car, c. 1905

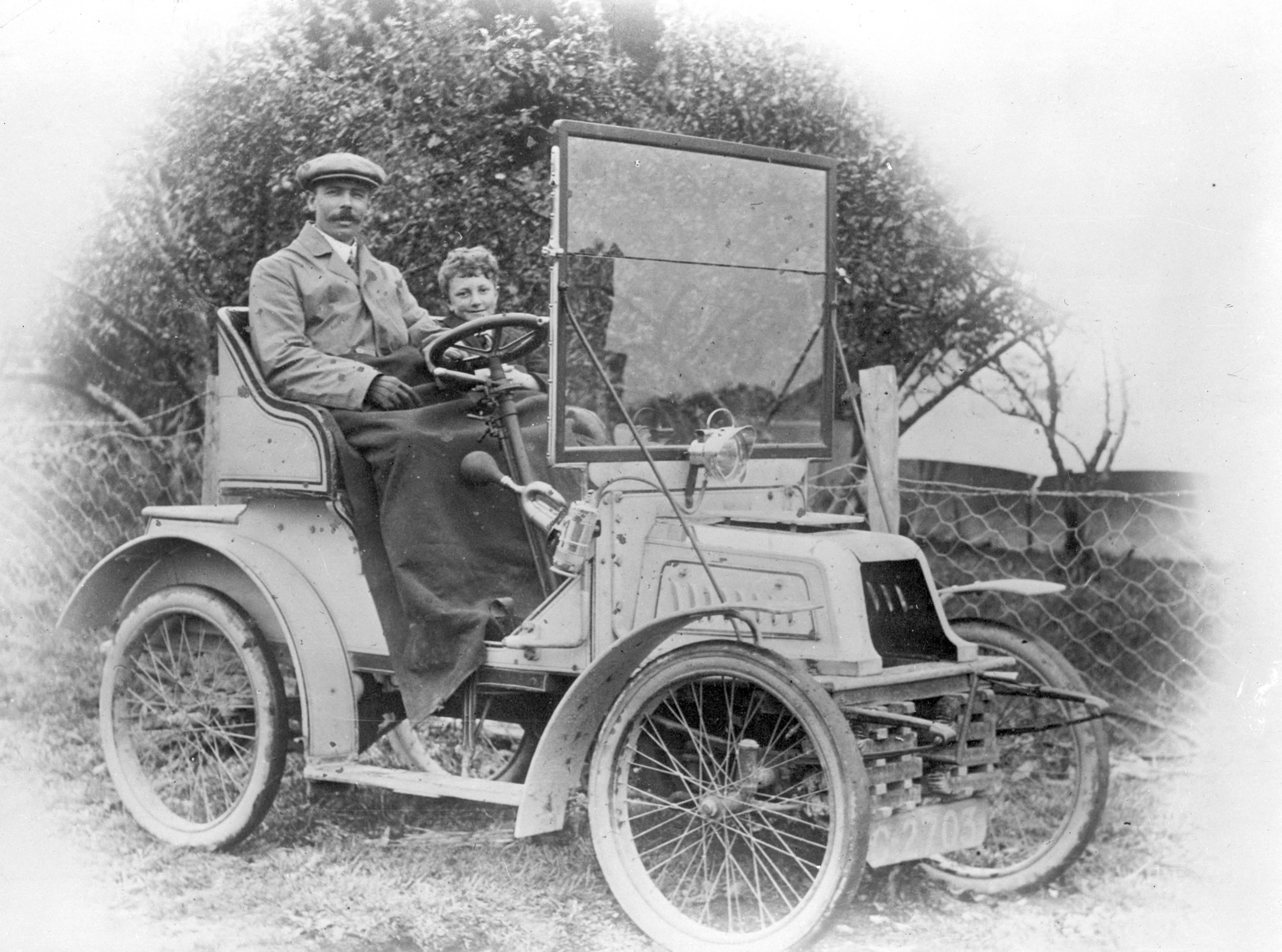
Cecil Wood and son seated in the fourth motor car "at the river between Peel Forest and Geraldine", c. 1910

Wood carried on managing the business as the Timaru branch of Speedwell Cycle Works, W. A. Scott, of Dunedin, from December 1903. He took a leading part in organising the motor trade in South Canterbury in 1904–05. By 1905, in addition to bicycles, he was selling Scott's steam cars.

In the period between 1903 and 1910, Wood designed and built several more motor cars; parts of his third being used to build the fourth. The construction of the first three-speed gear-box in New Zealand, "which consisted of a tube, having the sliding pinions fitted on the outside, with steel keys forced into slots in the pinions by means of springs from inside the tube", is also credited to him.

== Wood-Hill's, Wood's and the Cecil Wood Company Limited ==
In August 1915, Wood formed a partnership A Hill, taking over from retiring proprietor Walter Alexander Scott, to form Wood-Hill's. Hill, an engineer, had worked as a foreman of BSA's assembly department in Birmingham for 16 years. As Hill established Anzac Cycle Depot, A. Hill & Son, in 1916, Wood re-established his firm as Wood's, the continuation of the original cycle works founded by Gibson and himself in 1894, and from 20 December 1921 as The Cecil Wood Company Limited, licensed Ford dealers. The company was removed from the register in January 2009.

== Motor trade and service ==
In 1905, Dr Herbert Barclay of Waimate, who'd purchased a Stirling motor car in August 1903, with Wood and others, formed the South Canterbury Automobile Club, the first automobile club in Timaru. Wood took on the roles of president of the: South Canterbury Motor Trade Association, 1920s; South Canterbury Garage Proprietors' Association and the first Motor Olympia in South Canterbury, 1926; Motor Trade Association, 1929–30; Motor and Allied Trades' Organisation; South Canterbury Employers' Association; North End Golf Club and Timaru Bowling Club. He was a Freemason of Lodge St John English Constitution.

He was appointed to be a Justice of the Peace on 29 July 1937, and served as Coroner for the Dominion of New Zealand, Timaru, from 10 November 1937 to 31 March 1948.

== Later life ==
By 1964, Wood was residing at Elloughton Grange, known as "The Grange", in Timaru. He died in 1965, aged 91.

Robert Semple, when Minister of Transport, 1935–42, had said:

The credit of being the pioneer of the motor industry in New Zealand must go to Mr Cecil Walkden Wood, of Timaru, whose vehicle was built and run on the roads in 1897.
