= Gordon Ogilvie =

New Zealand biographer and historian (1934–2017)

Gordon Ogilvie ONZM
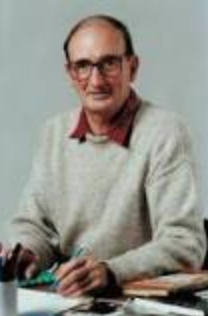
- Born: Gordon Bryant Ogilvie; 8 May 1934; Christchurch, New Zealand
- Died: 23 October 2017 (aged 83); Christchurch, New Zealand
- Occupation(s): Historian, teacher

Gordon Bryant Ogilvie ONZM (8 May 1934 – 23 October 2017) was a New Zealand historian and biographer who wrote over 20 books, mainly about the people, places and institutions of the Canterbury region. He played a considerable role in uncovering the exploits of pioneer aviator Richard Pearse and popularising these for the first time through his 1973 work The Riddle of Richard Pearse. His other major biography, Denis Glover : His Life (1999), was the first full account of this significant figure in New Zealand literature.

== Life ==
Born in Christchurch, Ogilvie grew up in the Horotane Valley where his father was an orchardist. He was educated at St Andrew's College and Canterbury University College, both in Christchurch, and Victoria University of Wellington, where he received an MA in English. After completing a diploma in post-primary teaching he eventually returned to St Andrew's College as head of English, a position he held for 24 years. He retired from teaching in 1993 to take up writing full-time. His wife Elisabeth (1934–2011) was the author of another Canterbury regional history, Purau (1970).

His output included three biographies, a range of regional, church, club, school, family and business histories, contributions to the Dictionary of New Zealand Biography and Historic Buildings of New Zealand : South Island (1983), innumerable feature articles and reviews, and two guide books. The Port Hills of Christchurch (1978) and Banks Peninsula: Cradle of Canterbury (1990) both won the J. M. Sherrard Award for New Zealand Regional History and have been republished in revised editions. The Riddle of Richard Pearse (1973) and Denis Glover: His Life (1999) were New Zealand Book of the Year finalists. The Riddle of Richard Pearse, which examined the claims that the New Zealand aviator was the first to achieve powered flight, was reprinted twice and used as the source for TV documentaries and dramas, a radio play and three stage plays, and collection of poems. Denis Glover: His Life was the first biography of the major New Zealand poet, and was described by Maurice Shadbolt as a "masterly achievement which has carried literary biography to a new plane in New Zealand."

== Awards ==
Ogilvie was appointed an Officer of the New Zealand Order of Merit in the 2008 New Year Honours for services to historical research. In 2000 he was awarded an honorary Doctor of Letters by the University of Canterbury for his contribution to the region's literature. He received an Arts Excellence Award from the Canterbury Community Trust in 1998.

== Death ==
Ogilvie died in Christchurch on 23 October 2017 from kidney cancer, less than two months after his final work, Place Names of Banks Peninsula and the Port Hills, was published by Canterbury University Press.

== Bibliography ==
- St Mary's Church, Heathcote (1960)
- Moonshine Country : The Story of Waitohi, South Canterbury (1971)
- The Riddle of Richard Pearse (1973)
- The Port Hills of Christchurch (1978)
- Introducing Denis Glover (1983)
- Banks Peninsula : Cradle of Canterbury (1990)
- Picturing the Peninsula : Early Days on Banks Peninsula (1992)
- High Flies the Cross : The 75th Jubilee History of St Andrew’s College, Christchurch, New Zealand, 1917–1992 (1992)
- Little Feet in a Big Room : Frances Ogilvie of China (1994)
- Pioneers of the Plains : The Deans of Canterbury (1996)
- From Gigs to Rigs : Steel Brothers and 120 Years of Road Transport in New Zealand (1997)
- Denis Glover : His Life (1999)
- Enjoying the Port Hills (2000)
- Picts and Porridge : An Ogilvie Family History (2002)
- The Christchurch Writers' Trail (2002)
- Ballantynes : The Story of Dunstable House, 1854–2004 (2004)
- The Shagroons' Palace : A History of the Christchurch Club, 1856–2006 (2006)
- High Flies the Cross: The 90th Anniversary History of St Andrew’s College 1917–2007 (2007)
- The Highland Piping Society of Canterbury : Jubilee History 1960–2010 (2010) (co-written with Alex Thomson)
- Place Names of Banks Peninsula and the Port Hills (2017)
