= Richard Pearse (film) =

- Directed by: Peter Muxlow
- Written by: Roger Simpson
- Produced by: Peter Muxlow
- Starring: Martyn Sanderson
- Cinematography: Max Quinn
- Edited by: Chris King
- Release date: December 1, 1975
- Running time: 55 min
- Country: New Zealand
- Language: English

Richard Pearse is a 1975 New Zealand television film. It is a dramatisation of a period of the life of flight pioneer Richard Pearse. It was written by Roger Simpson with research from Maria Hall. It was produced by Peter Muxlow and filmed in November 1974.

== Cast ==
- Martyn Sanderson as Richard Pearse
- Isa Moynihan as Sarah Pearse
- Jim Facer as Diggory Pearse
- John Bach as Jack Pearse
- Alannah O'Sullivan as Rose O'Shea
- Harold Pointer as Farrell O'Shea
- Mildred Woods as Mrs. O'Shea
- Barry Empson as Jimmy Orr
- James Moynihan as James Orr
- David McPhail as Mad John
- Judie Douglass as Mrs. Bennett

== Reception ==
R. J. Brittenden of The Press said "In nearly every aspect, "Richard Pearse" was extraordinarily good. It was very strong in atmosphere. It was particularly effective with the tennis tournament, the church service, the garden party, even in the Pearse family home, and the Victorian-style silences as the head of the house took his rest after dinner."

== Awards ==
Feltex Television Awards 1976

- Programme of the Year - Richard Pearse - won
- Actor of the Year - Martyn Sanderson - won

AWGIE Awards

- Roger Simpson - won
