= Hipa Te Maihāroa =

New Zealand tribal leader, tohunga, and prophet

Hipa Te Maihāroa (?–1886) was a notable New Zealand tribal leader, tohunga and prophet. Of Māori descent, he identified with the Waitaha, Kāti Māmoe and Ngāi Tahu iwi. He was born at Te Waiateruati pā near Temuka, South Canterbury, New Zealand.
