= Opihi College =

Secondary school in New Zealand

- Māori: Te Kāreti ō Ōpihi

Location
- 83/87 Richard Pearse Drive; Temuka, 7920; New Zealand; 44°14′22.96″S 171°17′37.18″E

Information
- Type: State co-ed secondary (Year 7–13)
- Motto: Latin: Recte et Fortitudine (Right and fortitude)
- Established: 1866; 160 years ago
- Ministry of Education Institution no.: 354
- Principal: Kirsten Stevens
- Enrolment: 280 (July 2026)
- Website: www.opihicollege.school.nz

Opihi College is a state co-educational secondary school in Temuka, New Zealand. The school was originally founded as Temuka District High School in 1866, and became Temuka High School in 1966. It is a relatively small high school catering to approximately 300 students from Year 7 to Year 13. It moved to its current site in 1969, and was renamed Opihi College, after the nearby Ōpihi River, in 2005.

A wharenui was opened at the school in 2021.

== Enrolment ==
As of July 2026, Opihi College has roll of 280 students, of which 68 (24.3%) identify as Māori.

As of 2026, the school has an Equity Index of 504, placing it amongst schools whose students have many socioeconomic barriers to achievement (roughly equivalent to deciles 2 and 3 under the former socio-economic decile system).

== Notable staff ==
- Ian Johnstone – broadcaster

== Notable alumni ==
- Erihapeti Rehu-Murchie – Ngāi Tahu leader, health researcher, actor and composer
