= Temuka =

Town in Canterbury, New Zealand

- Town
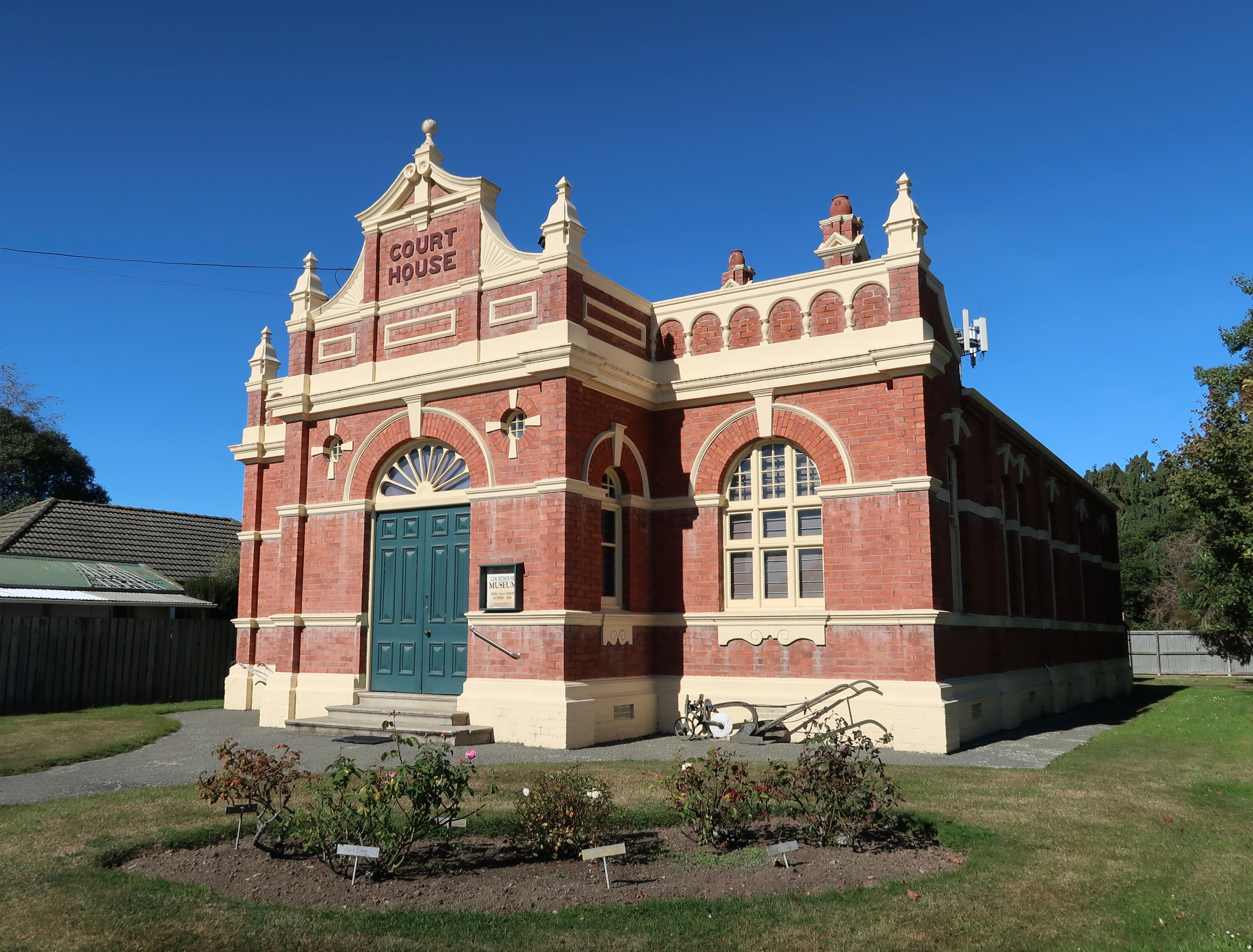
- The 1900 red brick courthouse with Baroque elements was designed by John Campbell of the Public Works Department, and functioned until 1979. It is now the town museum.
- Interactive map of Temuka
- Coordinates: 44°14′40″S 171°16′40″E
- Country: New Zealand
- Region: Canterbury
- Territorial authority: Timaru District
- Community board: Temuka Community Board
- Ward: Pleasant Point-Temuka
- Electorates: Rangitata; Te Tai Tonga (Māori)

Government
  - Territorial authority: Timaru District Council
  - Regional council: Environment Canterbury
  - Mayor of Timaru: Nigel Bowen
  - Rangitata MP: James Meager
  - Te Tai Tonga MP: Tākuta Ferris

Area
  - Total: 8.34 km^{2} (3.22 sq mi)
- Elevation: 15 m (49 ft)

Population (June 2025)
  - Total: 4,760
  - Density: 571/km^{2} (1,480/sq mi)
- Postcode(s): 7920
- Area code: 03

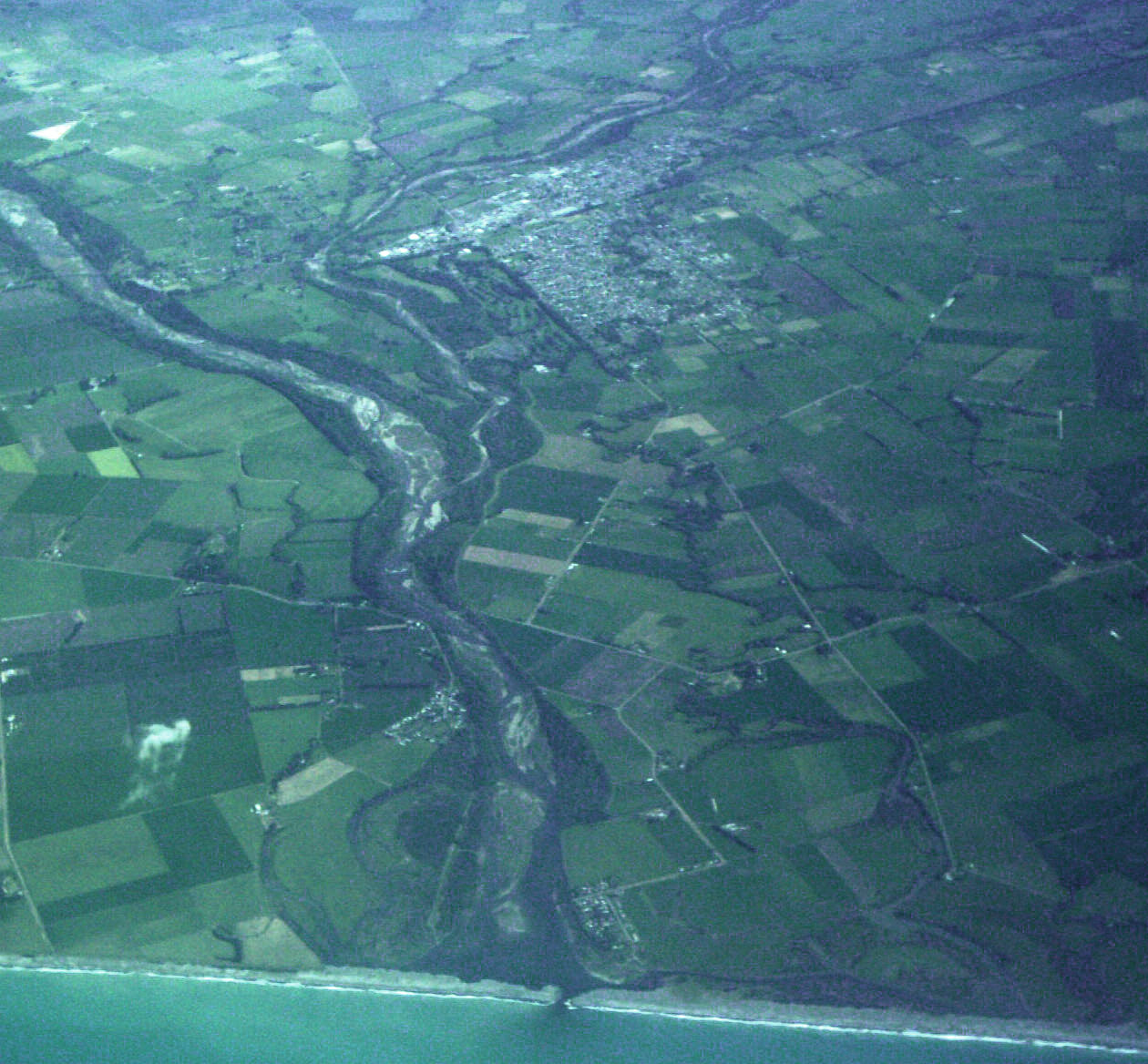
Temuka and the Ōpihi River. The photo was taken from an Air New Zealand ATR-72 flight from Christchurch to Invercargill

Temuka is a town on New Zealand's Canterbury Plains, 15 kilometres north of Timaru and 142 km south of Christchurch. It is located at the centre of a rich sheep and dairy farming region, for which it is a service town. It lies on the north bank of the Temuka River, just above its confluence with the Ōpihi River.

Temuka is the second largest town in South Canterbury after Timaru. Temuka is home to three schools, two primary schools and one secondary school. Temuka is accessed by New Zealand's State Highway Number 1 and the Main South Line railway allowing for major cargo handling. Temuka is north of the Opihi and Temuka rivers. The local secondary school, Opihi College, takes its name from the Opihi River. Both rivers are popular with locals and tourists. Almost all traffic passing north or south goes through or around Temuka. Temuka has recently had the redevelopment of the local Domain by incorporating a skate park to join the other facilities which include a swimming pool, mini golf, golf, netball, outdoor bowls and tennis. There are also rugby and football fields, a stadium complex and a holiday park.

== History ==
The name Temuka, or Te Muka, is a corruption of Te Umu-kaha, which is thought to mean either 'fierce ovens' or 'strong current'. The fierce ovens would be the large earth ovens (umu) that Māori used to cook the roots of plentifully-growing cabbage trees. Temuka was originally called Wallingford.

Temuka was gazetted as a town in 1858. The first survey was conducted in 1863. The first buildings were erected in 1860. Initial industries included a tannery works, a cheese factory, a flour mill and potteries. The police barracks were built in 1863 and the telegraph office was opened in 1868. In 1878, the Oddfellows lodge and the St George Masonic lodge were opened. The Temuka town board was constituted in 1884. In 1899, Wallingford and Arowhenua town districts were incorporated into the borough of Temuka.

The population of Temuka was 1465 people in 1901. Temuka was described in 1903 as having two doctors, two chemists and one dentist in the town, which has a well kept park and domain, with a bicycle track, and tennis, cricket and football grounds. The two storied post and telegraph office was opened in 1902 by Sir Joseph Ward.

Temuka was a stop on the Main South Line until passenger services were discontinued. At one time Temuka supported wool scouring plants, it had a flour mill and manufactured electric power transmission insulators.

Temuka was hit by a significant flood on 13 March 1986, with Temuka being isolated after the bridge crossing State Highway 1 being washed out.

Temuka previously had its own council system in place, but has been under the administration of Timaru District Council since 1989. Recently, the council has been redeveloping Temuka in the form of cleaning waterways, new walkways, redeveloping of existing walkways, new gardens, domains, new tennis courts, complete skate park and general modernisation of the large service town.

== Marae ==
Arowhenua marae, a marae (tribal meeting ground) of Ngāi Tahu and its Te Rūnanga o Arowhenua branch, is located south of Temuka. It includes Te Hapa o Niu Tireni wharenui (meeting house).

In October 2020, the Government committed $50,232 from the Provincial Growth Fund to upgrade the marae, creating 16 jobs.

== Demographics ==
The population of Temuka was 2212 people in 1951, 2254 people in 1956 and 2430 people in 1961.

Temuka is described by Statistics New Zealand as a small urban area. It covers 8.34 km^{2} (3.22 sq mi) and had an estimated population of 4,760 as of June 2025, with a population density of 571 people per km^{2}.

Historical population
Year	Pop.	±% p.a.
2006	4,245	—
2013	4,254	+0.03%
2018	4,467	+0.98%
2023	4,593	+0.56%

Temuka had a population of 4,593 in the 2023 New Zealand census, an increase of 126 people (2.8%) since the 2018 census, and an increase of 339 people (8.0%) since the 2013 census. There were 2,262 males, 2,319 females, and 12 people of other genders in 1,980 dwellings. 2.1% of people identified as LGBTIQ+. The median age was 47.0 years (compared with 38.1 years nationally). There were 798 people (17.4%) aged under 15 years, 708 (15.4%) aged 15 to 29, 1,947 (42.4%) aged 30 to 64, and 1,140 (24.8%) aged 65 or older.

People could identify as more than one ethnicity. The results were 88.8% European (Pākehā); 14.6% Māori; 2.7% Pasifika; 4.2% Asian; 0.4% Middle Eastern, Latin American and African New Zealanders (MELAA); and 3.1% other, which includes people giving their ethnicity as "New Zealander". English was spoken by 98.0%, Māori by 2.5%, Samoan by 0.3%, and other languages by 4.4%. No language could be spoken by 1.6% (e.g. too young to talk). New Zealand Sign Language was known by 0.6%. The percentage of people born overseas was 11.4, compared with 28.8% nationally.

Religious affiliations were 33.7% Christian, 0.7% Hindu, 0.1% Islam, 0.5% Māori religious beliefs, 0.3% Buddhist, 0.3% New Age, 0.1% Jewish, and 1.1% other religions. People who answered that they had no religion were 53.8%, and 9.7% of people did not answer the census question.

Of those at least 15 years old, 321 (8.5%) people had a bachelor's or higher degree, 2,190 (57.7%) had a post-high school certificate or diploma, and 1,290 (34.0%) people exclusively held high school qualifications. The median income was $36,300, compared with $41,500 nationally. 240 people (6.3%) earned over $100,000 compared to 12.1% nationally. The employment status of those at least 15 was 1,833 (48.3%) full-time, 450 (11.9%) part-time, and 69 (1.8%) unemployed.

Individual statistical areas
Name	Area (km^{2})	Population	Density (per km^{2})	Dwellings	Median age	Median income
Temuka West	4.07	2,208	543	1,011	50.0 years	$34,100
Temuka East	4.27	2,385	559	966	43.5 years	$38,400
New Zealand					38.1 years	$41,500

== Churches ==
=== Presbyterian church ===
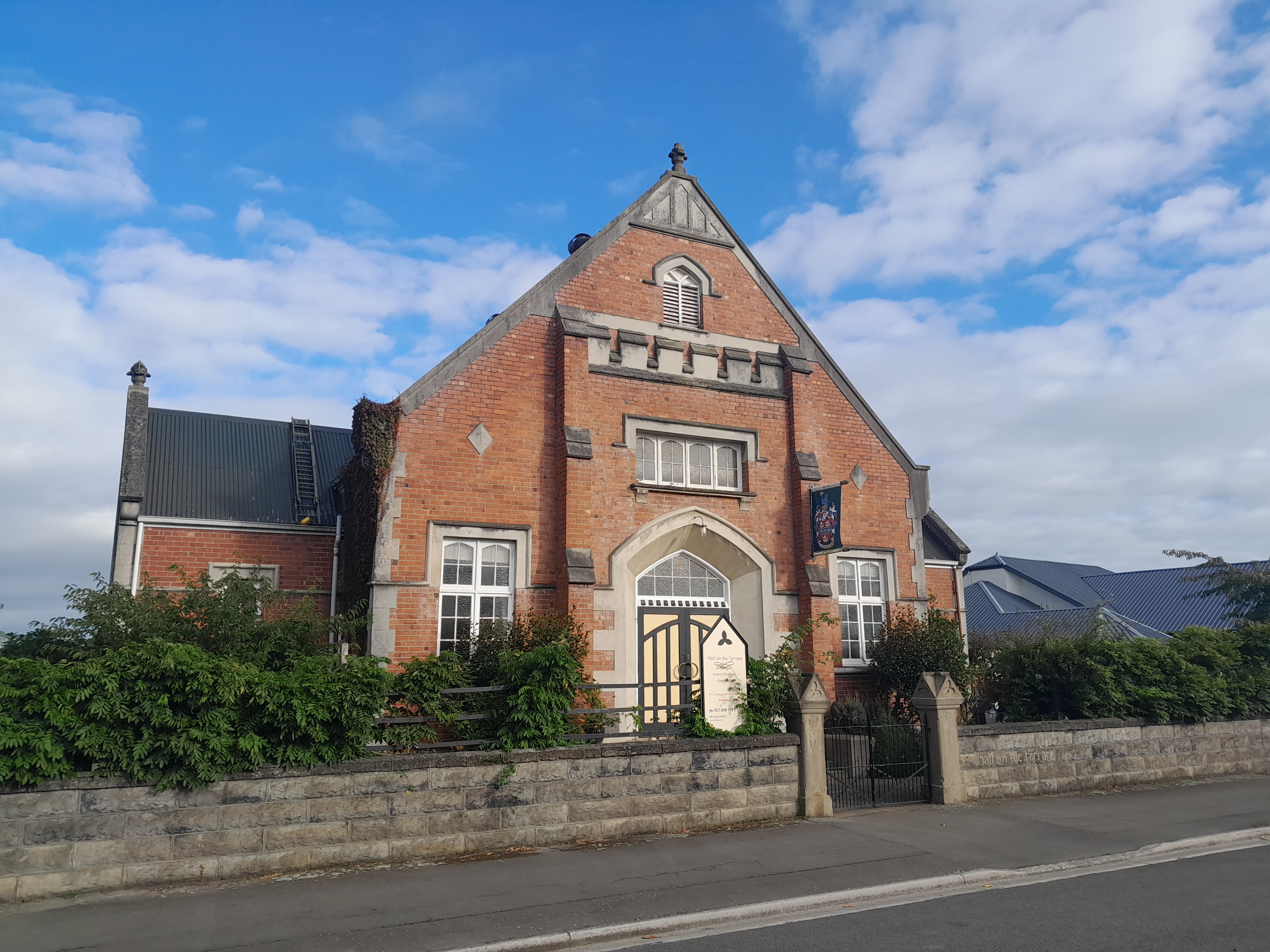
Trinity Presbyterian church Sunday school hall, Temuka (2023)

The Trinity Presbyterian church was damaged in the 2010 Canterbury earthquakes and was subsequently demolished. The church was 120 years old. The Sunday school hall was built after 1915 and funded by the Guild family, of Temuka. It was used as a hospital during the 1918 influenza epidemic. It was sold in 2002.

=== Saint Peters Anglican church ===
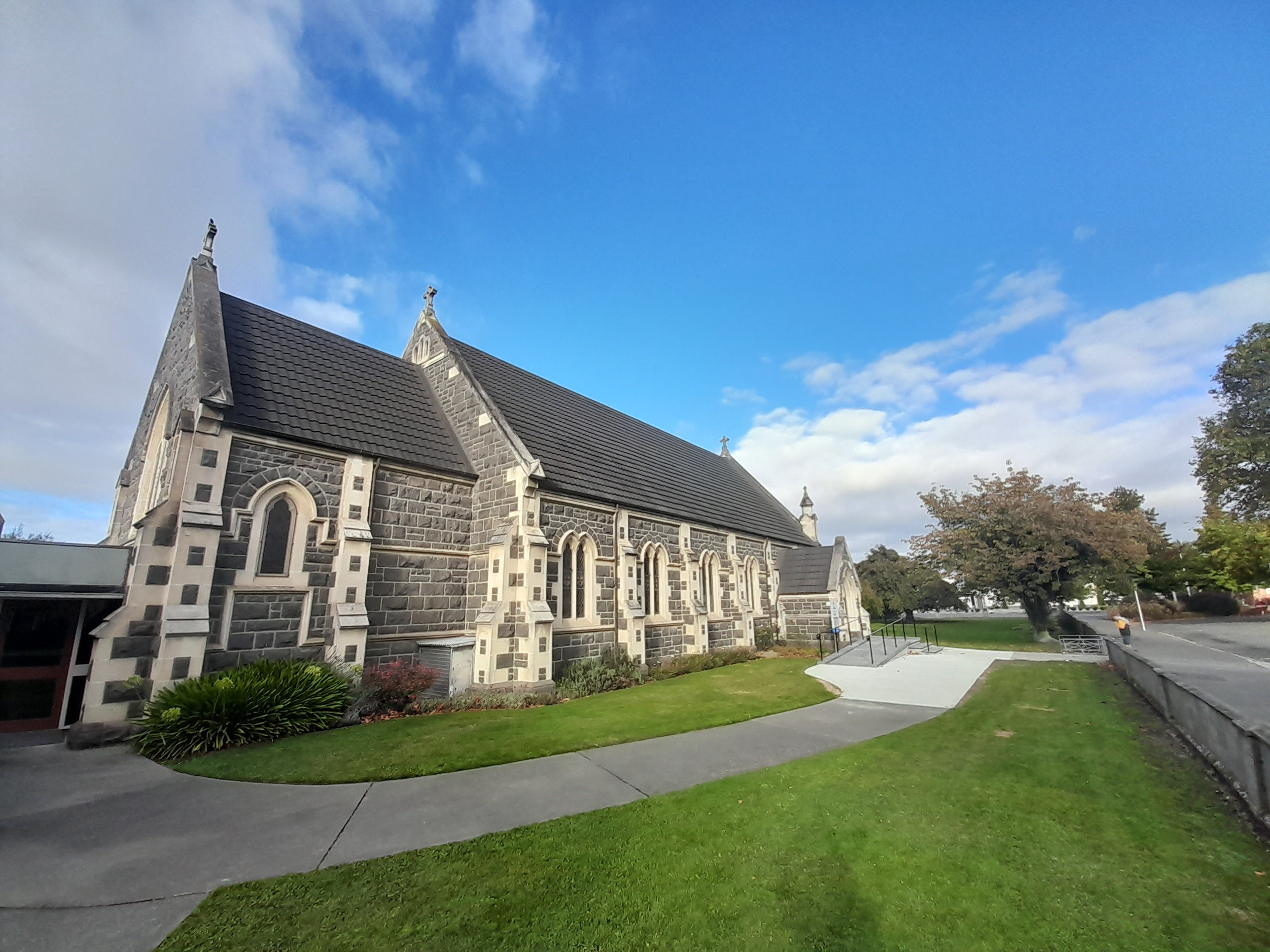
St Peter's Anglican Church, Temuka (2023)

Saint Peters was built in 1899 and has seating for 300 parishioners. It also sustained damage in the 2010 Canterbury earthquakes.

== Education ==
There are currently three primary and secondary schools in Temuka.

Temuka Primary School is a contributing primary for years 1 to 6 with a roll of 205 students. A public school for both primary and secondary students opened in 1866, and moved to the current site in the late 1870s. The secondary school moved to a separate site in 1968.

St. Joseph's School is a Catholic state-integrated full primary for years 1 to 8 with a roll of 106 students. The school opened in 1883.

Opihi College is a secondary school for years 7 to 13 with a roll of 280 students. It was originally called Temuka District High School, then Temuka High School when it moved to its current site, and in 2005 the name was changed to Opihi College.

All these schools are coeducational. Rolls are as of July 2026.

== Sport and recreation ==
=== Rugby ===
The Temuka Rugby Club was established in 1875 with four players representing the All Blacks: Lachie Grant, Tom Coughlan, Archie Strang and Gus Spillane.

=== Temuka golf club ===
The Temuka golf club was established in 1907. Originally a 9 hole golf course, it has expanded to 18 holes. The Temuka golf course suffered significant flooding in May 2021 after the Temuka river burst its banks and flood waters were up to two metres high on the golf course. Flooding also closed the golf course for six months in 1986.

=== Temuka bowling club ===
The Temuka bowling club was founded in 1906. It is located in the Temuka Domain. It holds a number of tournaments throughout the year including the Temuka 3000 at New Years.

=== Swimming pool ===
The Temuka summer pool is open between mid November and late March each year. It is located at the Temuka Domain on Ferguson Drive. It has a 25 metre pool with 6 lanes and a toddlers pool. The pools are heated and outdoors.

== Museum ==
The Temuka courthouse museum has over 6000 items detailing the local history of Temuka. It is located in the former courthouse, which was built between 1900 and 1901 and used as a courthouse until 1979. The building required earthquake strengthening in 2020. This was funded by a grant from the New Zealand Lottery Environment and Heritage Fund.

== Business ==
Temuka is home to a large trucking company, Temuka Transport. This company has about 40 trucks which are used to service the South Canterbury area. Also located in the town is Temuka Homeware. This company produces ceramic crockery. Currently, the older and traditional items are seeing an increase of demand from collectors. Located in Temuka are various businesses including supermarkets, takeaways, collectors, hardware stores, office supply stores, and art galleries.

Temuka is home to New Zealand Insulators (NZI), the major supplier of insulators to New Zealand's power industry. Temuka houses NZI's corporate headquarters, South Island warehouse, and local factory. Temuka is also home to the only bagpipe bag manufacturing business in New Zealand, Gannaway New Zealand, manufacturing cowhide, goatskin, and sheepskin bagpipe bags exported worldwide.

== Notable residents ==
- Rachel Armitage (1873–1955), welfare worker
- Ned Barry (1905–1993), rugby union player
- Horace Fildes (1875–1937), postmaster, book collector and bibliographer
- John Langridge (1864–1931), born in Temuka
- John Lister (born 1947), professional golfer
- Richard Pearse (1877–1953), aviation pioneer
- Hipa Te Maihāroa (died 1886), tribal leader, tohunga and prophet
- Jeremiah Twomey (1847–1921), member of the New Zealand Legislative Council
- Lachie Grant (1923–2002), rugby union player

== Climate ==
Climate data for Temuka (1981–2010 normals, extremes 1963–1994)
Month	Jan	Feb	Mar	Apr	May	Jun	Jul	Aug	Sep	Oct	Nov	Dec	Year
Record high °C (°F)	35.4 (95.7)	39.4 (102.9)	33.2 (91.8)	30.0 (86.0)	26.0 (78.8)	24.0 (75.2)	21.5 (70.7)	22.0 (71.6)	25.6 (78.1)	29.6 (85.3)	32.7 (90.9)	33.4 (92.1)	39.4 (102.9)
Mean daily maximum °C (°F)	21.8 (71.2)	21.0 (69.8)	19.5 (67.1)	17.4 (63.3)	14.4 (57.9)	11.7 (53.1)	11.0 (51.8)	12.5 (54.5)	14.7 (58.5)	16.5 (61.7)	18.0 (64.4)	19.8 (67.6)	16.5 (61.7)
Daily mean °C (°F)	16.1 (61.0)	15.8 (60.4)	14.0 (57.2)	11.5 (52.7)	8.7 (47.7)	6.0 (42.8)	5.4 (41.7)	6.9 (44.4)	9.0 (48.2)	10.8 (51.4)	12.6 (54.7)	14.6 (58.3)	11.0 (51.7)
Mean daily minimum °C (°F)	10.4 (50.7)	10.5 (50.9)	8.5 (47.3)	5.6 (42.1)	3.0 (37.4)	0.3 (32.5)	−0.1 (31.8)	1.3 (34.3)	3.4 (38.1)	5.0 (41.0)	7.1 (44.8)	9.5 (49.1)	5.4 (41.7)
Record low °C (°F)	1.9 (35.4)	2.0 (35.6)	−2.0 (28.4)	−3.0 (26.6)	−7.7 (18.1)	−6.8 (19.8)	−6.3 (20.7)	−5.6 (21.9)	−4.2 (24.4)	−4.3 (24.3)	−1.0 (30.2)	0.8 (33.4)	−7.7 (18.1)
Average rainfall mm (inches)	40.3 (1.59)	60.4 (2.38)	58.9 (2.32)	38.3 (1.51)	49.0 (1.93)	30.9 (1.22)	51.4 (2.02)	48.2 (1.90)	42.3 (1.67)	50.2 (1.98)	53.6 (2.11)	62.0 (2.44)	585.5 (23.07)
Source: NIWA
