= Kit and replica cars of New Zealand =

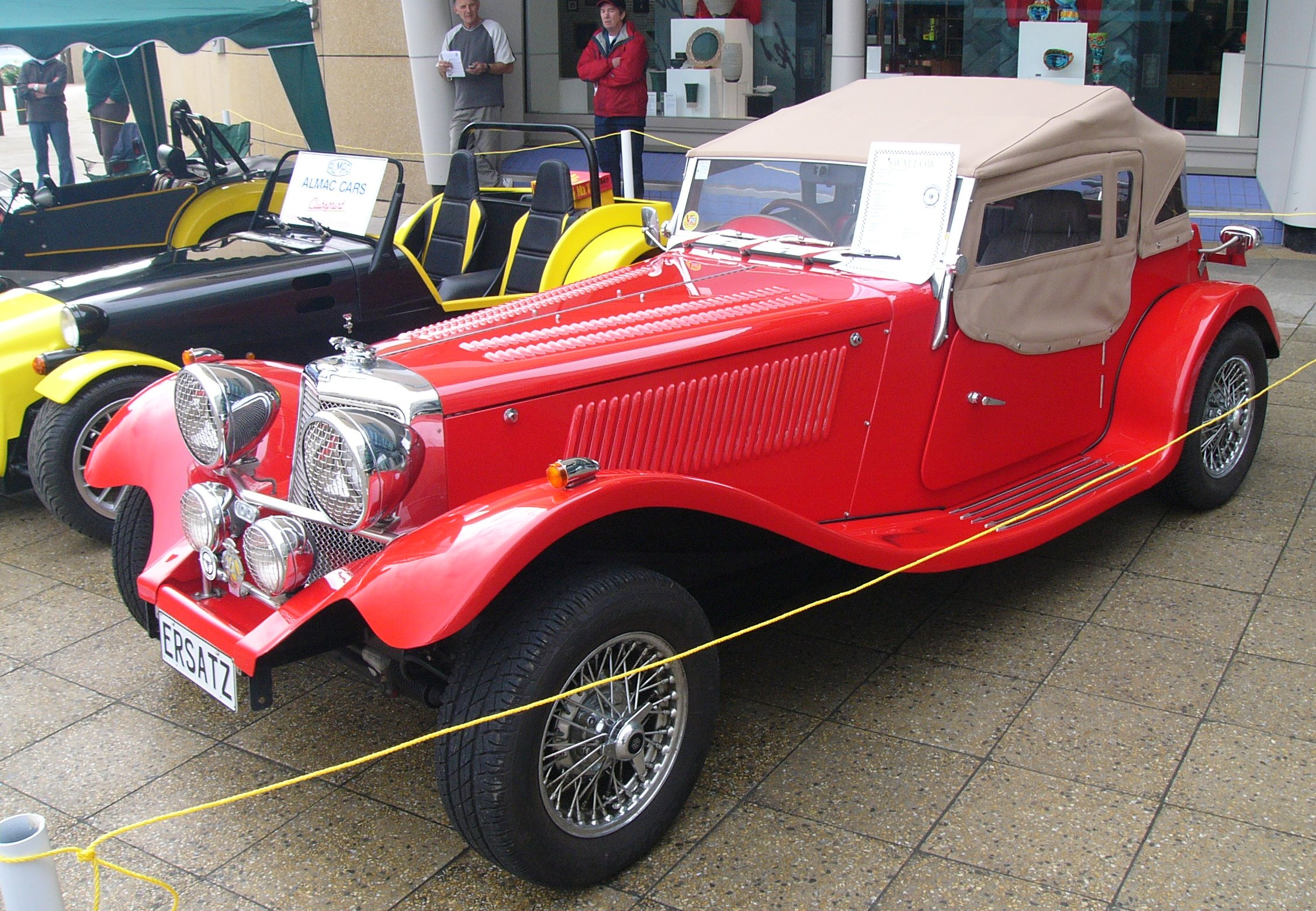
Alternative Cars - Swallow

New Zealand has a long history of small garages and vehicle enthusiasts modifying and creating sports and sports racing cars. Out of these interests grew the New Zealand kit and replica car industry, with the introduction of fibre-glass car bodies in the 1950s.

== Beginnings ==
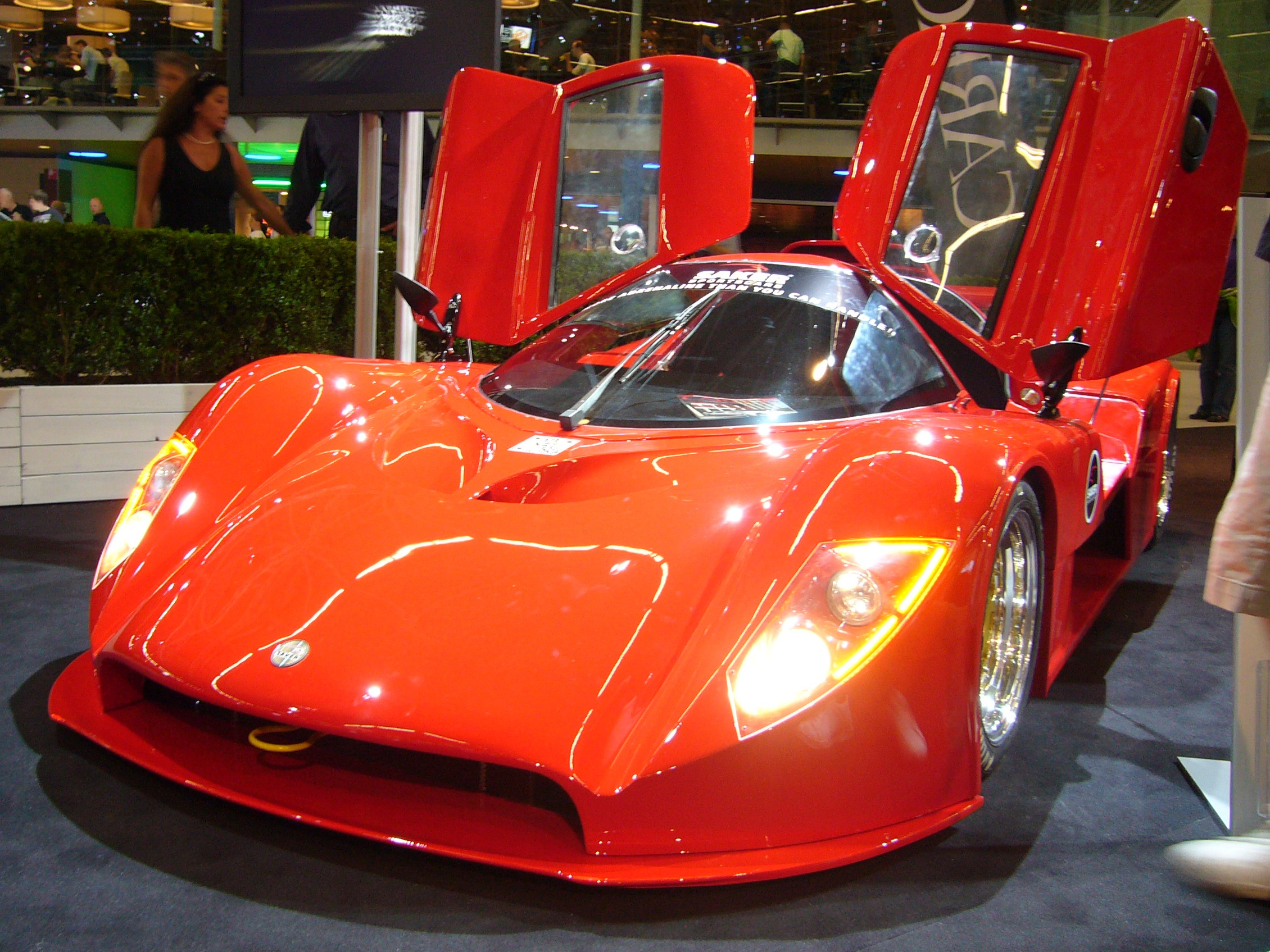
Saker GT

In the early 1950s, with the advent of fibreglass bodied cars, a new opportunity arose for local companies associated with car enthusiasts to create car bodies. Among the first of these early manufacturers was Weltex Plastics Limited of Christchurch, which imported a Microplas Mistral sports car mould and began making bodies and chassis in 1956, along with Brian Jarvis. They were followed in 1957 by Frank Cantwell's Puma, the Ching, F10, and Falcon. Also in New Zealand during this period, Ferris de Joux was constructing a variety of sports racers. De Joux is noted in particular for his Mini GT from the 1960s.

The Everson brothers, who were noted for making New Zealand first indigenous twin engined mono-plane, between 1935 and 1937 created a small two-seater rear engined car called the Everson Cherub. Three different one-off models were made by the brothers. Ernest's son Cliff built a variety of Everson models from the 1960s to the 1980s. The most successful was his eight Cherubs that were similar in design to the Mini Moke.

Ross Baker's Heron Cars started in 1962 making racing cars and eventually began producing kit cars in 1980. Bill Ashton, and Ted George in the 1960s and moulded Tiki fibreglass bodies at their firm George and Ashton Limited in Dunedin.Three were known to have been made. Graham McRae with Steve Bond of Gemini Plastics imported a replica Le Mans McLaren M6B styled GT mould in 1968, The cars were made and sold by Dave Harrod and Steve Bond of Fibreglass Developments Ltd, Bunnythorpe as the Maram. McRae went on to make a very good Porsche Spyder replica in the 1990s.

A number of new companies entered the market in the 1980s - Almac 1985, Alternative Cars (1984), Cheetah (1986), Chevron (1984), Countess Mouldings (1988), Fraser (1988), Leitch (1986), and Saker (1989). Some recent ones are Beattie (automobile) (1997), which became Redline in 2001, and McGregor (2001).

Two companies which specialise in making replicas of various models to order are Classic Car Developments (1992) and Tempero. Both of these companies were noted for the quality of their workmanship. Commencing in 2002, Coventry Classics Limited from Gore specialised in making replica Jaguar C-Types.

== Notable people ==
=== Bill Ashton ===
Bill Ashton and Ted George (George & Ashton Limited) moulded fibreglass Tiki sports car bodies in Dunedin.

=== Ferris de Joux ===
Ferris de Joux (1935–2009) was a designer, engineer and constructor of sports cars. He was born on 24 August 1935. De Joux was said to have been one of New Zealand's most talented automotive designers. He appeared regularly in motoring magazines such as Motorman and Sports Car World from the 1970s.

=== Patrick Harlow ===
Patrick Harlow is a New Zealand automotive historian, journalist, teacher, and car enthusiast who is noted for his work on the New Zealand kit car industry. He has been a regular contributor to New Zealand Classic Car Magazine and the Constructors Car Club magazine, Spare Parts.

=== Graham McRae ===
Graham McRae (5 March 1940 – 4 August 2021) was a racing driver from New Zealand. He achieved considerable success in Formula 5000 racing, winning the Tasman Series each year from 1971 to 1973, and also the 1972 L&M Continental 5000 Championship in the United States. McRae went on to make Porsche Spyder replicas in New Zealand.

=== Peter Pellandine ===
Peter Pellandine founded Ashley Laminates with Keith Waddington. They designed and made fibreglass sports cars bodies under the name "Ashley". In late 1956 Peter Pellandine split from the partnership up Falcon Shells. It had the rights to the short wheel base Ashley 750, which became the Falcon Mk 1, and the Ashley Sports Racer the Falcon Mk II. Pelladine moved to New Zealand with his family in 1957, and set up a New Zealand branch of Falcon Shells. In 1959 he returned to England via Australia.

== Manufacturers ==
=== Acorn ===
A series of six cars built by Peter Parkinson of Christchurch. The cars were named after Peanuts characters, with the first being called the Acorn Lucy (now registered as the Strike88) in the early 1970s. He built two Acorn Marcies - a small sports car based on a 1300cc Triumph Herald engine. The last car was called the Acorn Schroeder, a car similar in shape to the Bugatti Type 35. The other known name was Linus.

=== Almac ===
Almac is a New Zealand-based kit car company founded in 1984 and located in Upper Hutt. Almac Cars is a part of Almac Reinforced Plastics Ltd, a fibreglass product manufacturing company founded in 1971 by Alex McDonald. McDonald's interest in kit cars started while he was living in England, having purchased a Jem Marsh Sirocco. Jem Marsh founded the Marcos car company.

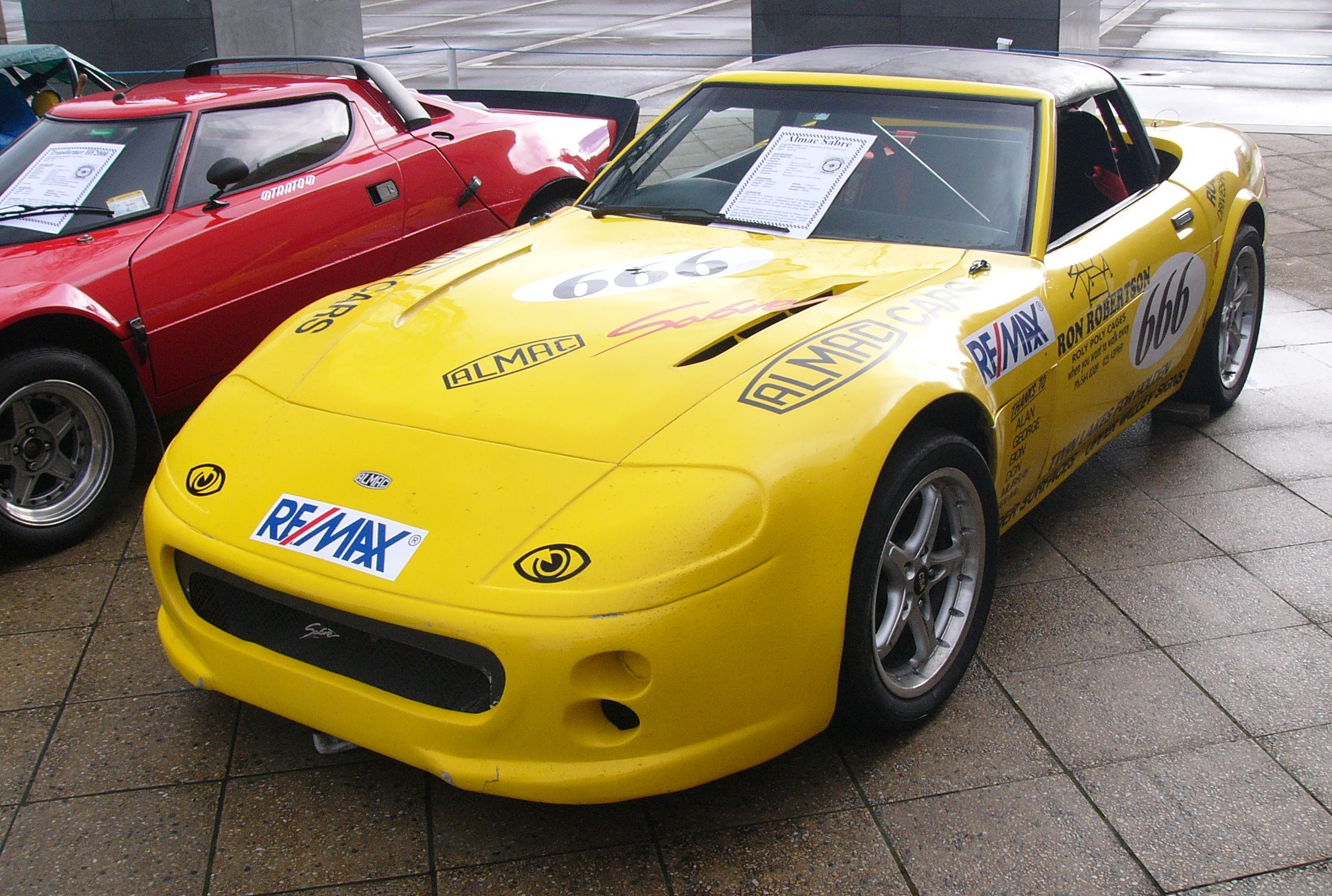
Almac Sabre

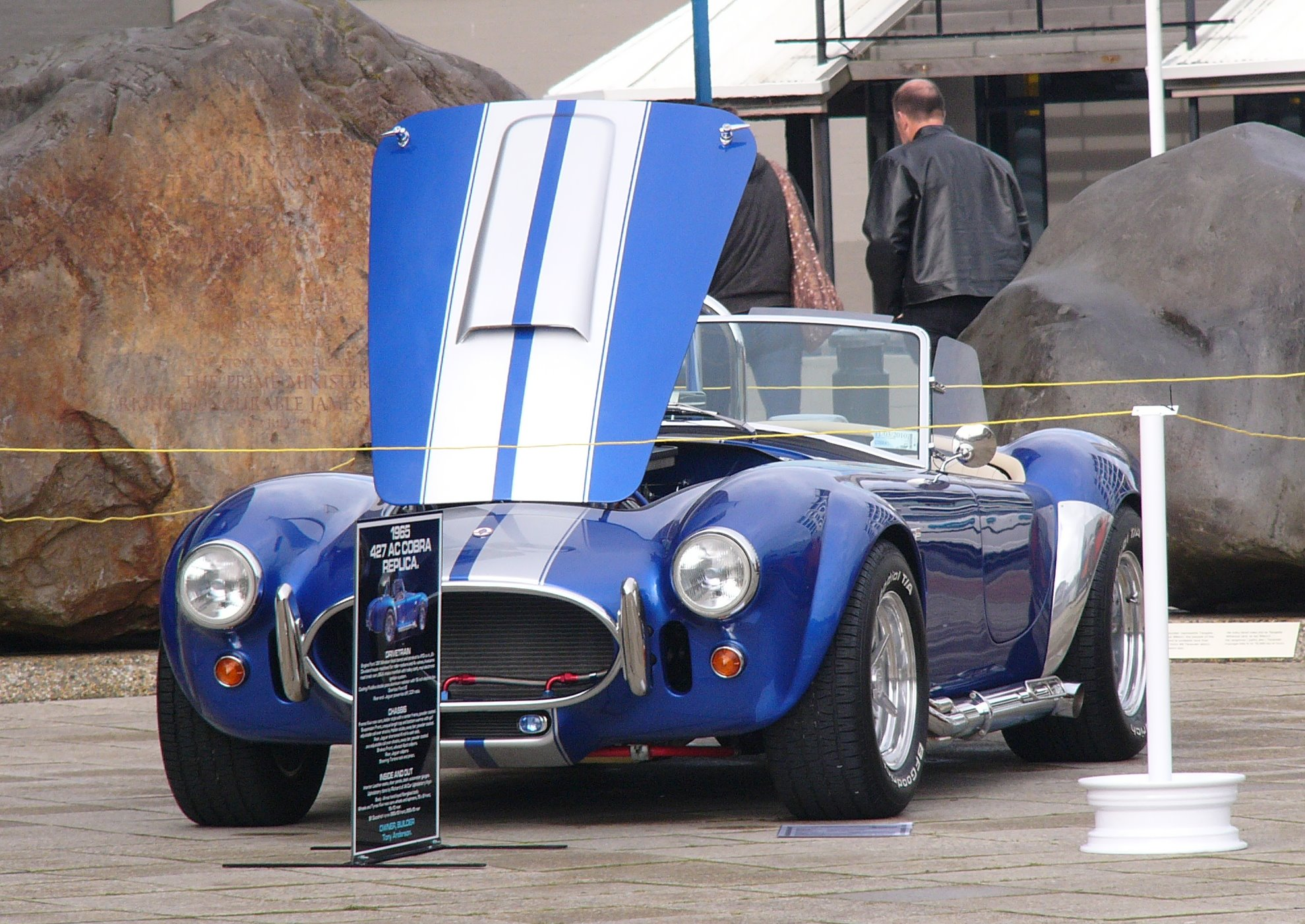
Almac 427 Cobra

=== Alternative Cars ===
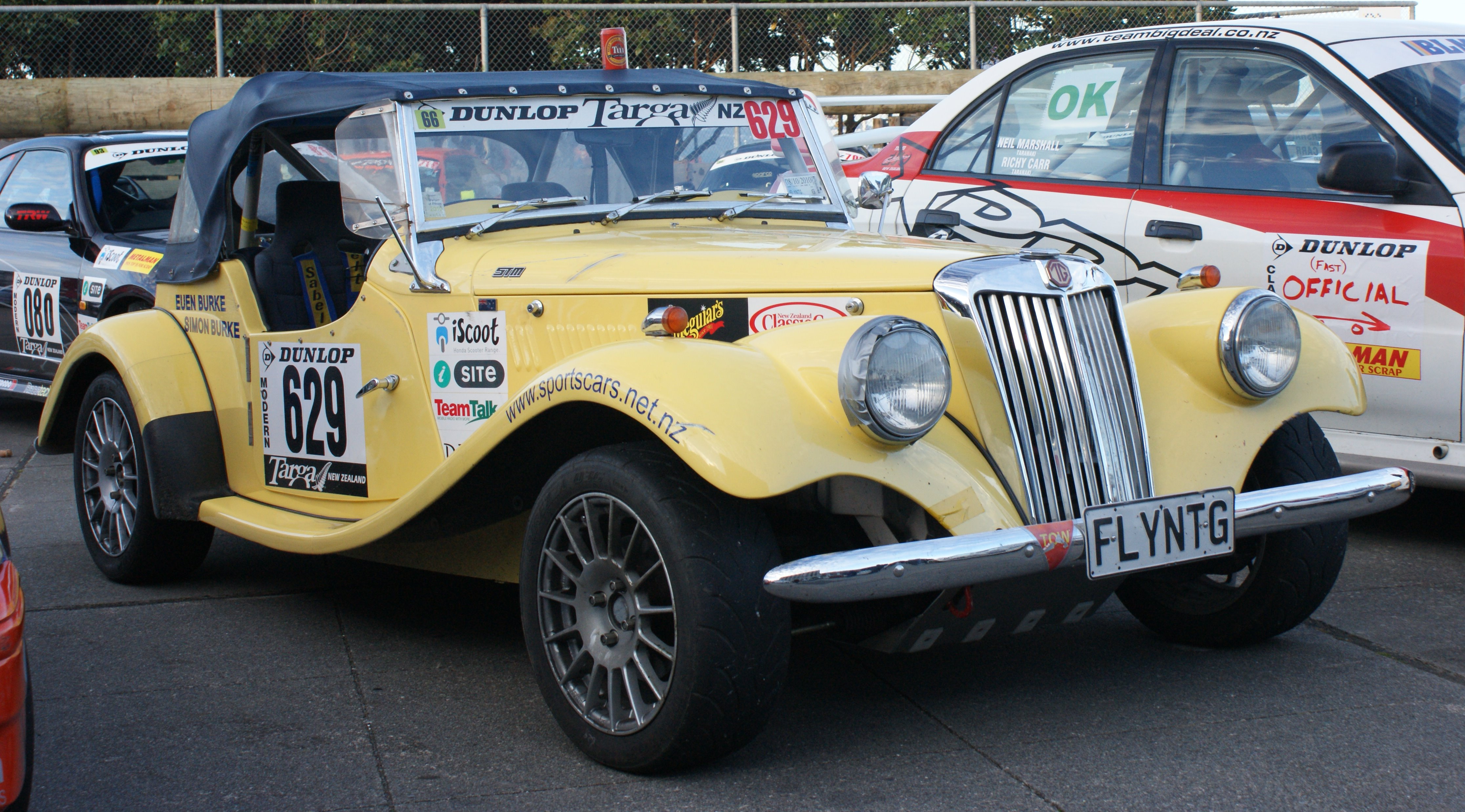
Alternative cars TG

Alternative Cars Limited is a New Zealand-based kit car company that manufactures fiber-glass bodied cars based on the 1950s MG TF. The company was founded by Russell Hooper, a medical supply representative, as Kit Kars Limited in 1984. In 1996 Kit Kars Ltd changed its name to Alternative Cars Limited. Initially the company operated from the owner's home, until moving to a small 600 square foot workshop in Auckland.

=== Amero ===
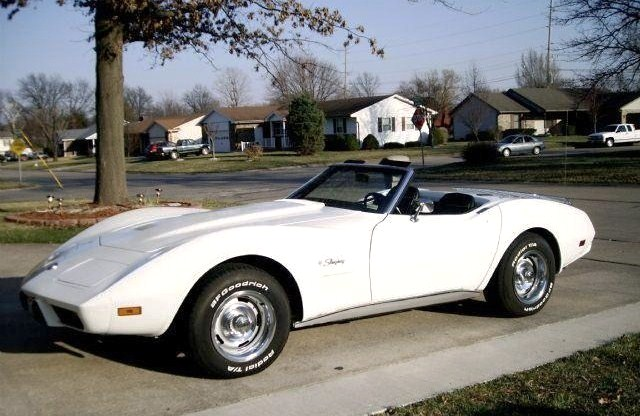
The Amero was a replica of the C3 Corvette.

Gordon Hook began making fibreglass bodied cars in 1974 while working as foreman of a fibreglass manufacturing company. His father had been an A grade motor mechanic, which had sparked his interest and mechanical ability. His first car was called the Amero 2+2, which was smaller than but had similar styling to the Ford Capri. It is rumoured that this car was first made by an Air New Zealand employee and the body was extensively modified by Hook when he acquired it. Hook made another three of these car bodies between 1974 and 1977.

After this, Hook began making fibreglass replacement panels for Australian made Holdens and Fords. In 1979 he obtained a burnt out C3 Corvette, while in the United States. Using this, he created his own chassis and fibreglass body panels. Holden HQs were used as the donor car for mechanical parts and wiring. Trim and lights were imported from the United States. The replica C3 Corvette was made between 1983 and 1995. In all 25 kits were made with three versions: roadster, fastback, and T-Top. Hook's final car in this series, a replica Greenwood Corvette, only progressed as far as a prototype.

Between 1993 and 1995 Hook began development of a new car the Amero California. Based around spy photos of the upcoming Chevrolet Camaro, the prototype was completed in mid-1993. Unfortunately no orders eventuated and Hook left New Zealand for Australia in 1995. The moulds and jigs were sold and no further cars made.

=== Asco Aura ===
A 1950s style sports car made between 1984 and 1988 by Peter Andrews of Andrews Sports Car Company of Taupo. The Aura was first shown at the 1985 New Zealand Motor Expo in Auckland. 11 kits were made.

=== Aspen ===
Aspen built two kit cars in Auckland - the Aspen Aurora from 1976 to 1985 and the Aspen Siris from 1989 to 1998.

=== Auckland Cobra ===
A replica AC Cobra made in Papatoetoe, Auckland by Rex Garland since 1983. The cars are fitted with Ford 302 V8s and Toyota 5 speed gearbox. By 2012 49 kits or turnkeys had been made. Two of these had hard-tops.

=== Beattie (now Redline) ===
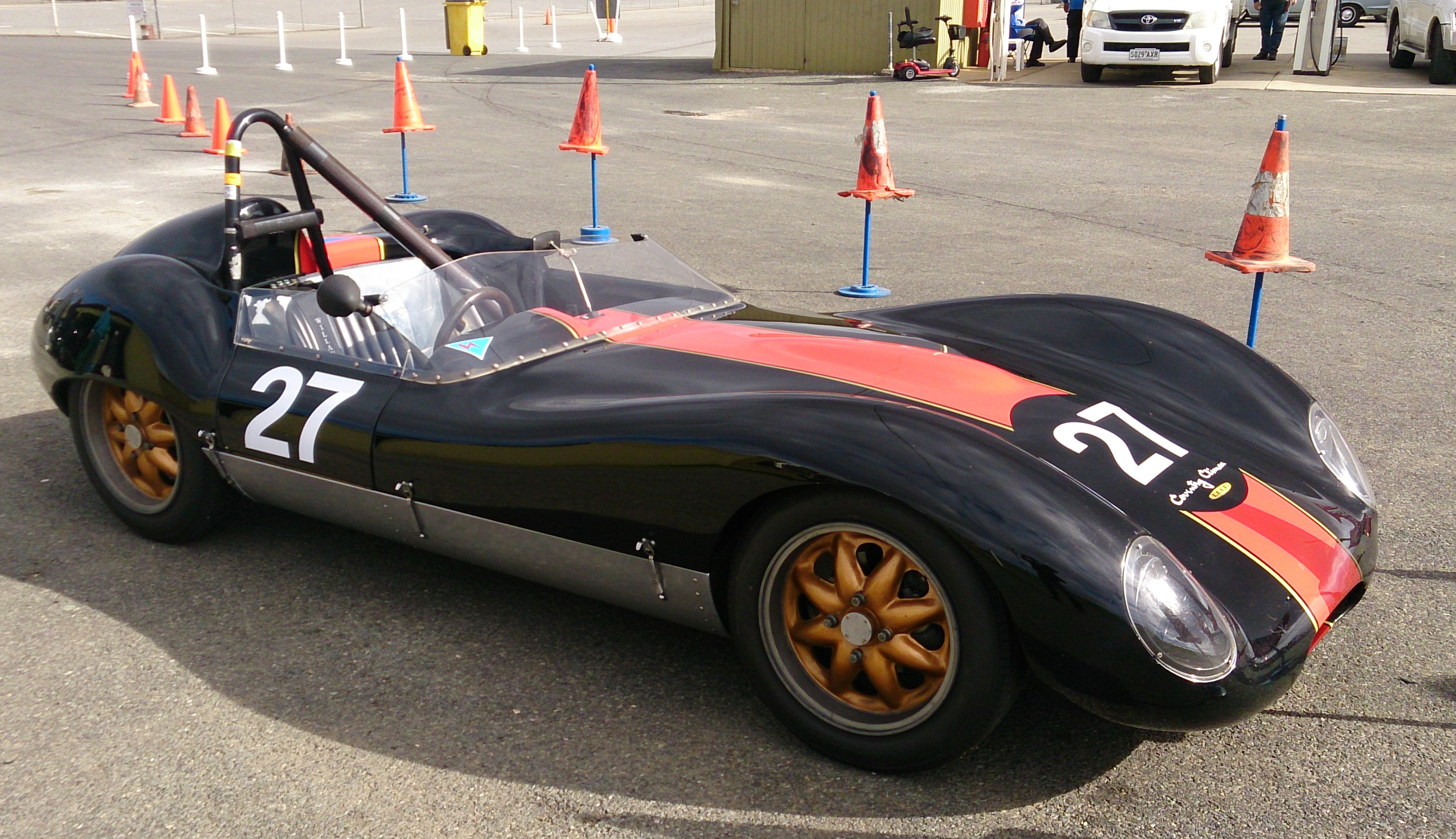
Lola on which the Beattie is based

Beattie was originally a New Zealand kitcar created by Stephen Charles Beattie and its manufacture is now based in the United Kingdom. It made the Beattie SR2000 and Clubman Sports, based on the Lola-Climax Mk1. Kevin Hunt of Redline Performance Cars Limited acquired the design from Stephen Beattie in 1999 and the car was renamed the Redline Sprint with a least two models being available, the Sprint and the Road Sport. It was available up to at least 2007.

=== Briford Sports ===
A roadster made by Brian Ford since 1982 and still in production in 2012. It is a cross between an AC Cobra and a Mistral. Up to 2012 16 kits had been made. It may have been based on a Microplas Stiletto or Scimitar which has an almost identical shape. Most have been sold with Brifords chassis, although some were fitted to others chassis.

=== Cantwell Car Limited ===
Frank Cantwell's company Cantwell Car Limited made a fibreglass sports car called the Puma between 1957 and 1960. The cars used an Ashley 750 body and a chassis designed by New Zealander Arthur Praed. A total of 6 were thought to have been made. There are believed to be only two surviving cars. One of these has been in the United States since 2003.

=== Cheetah Cars ===
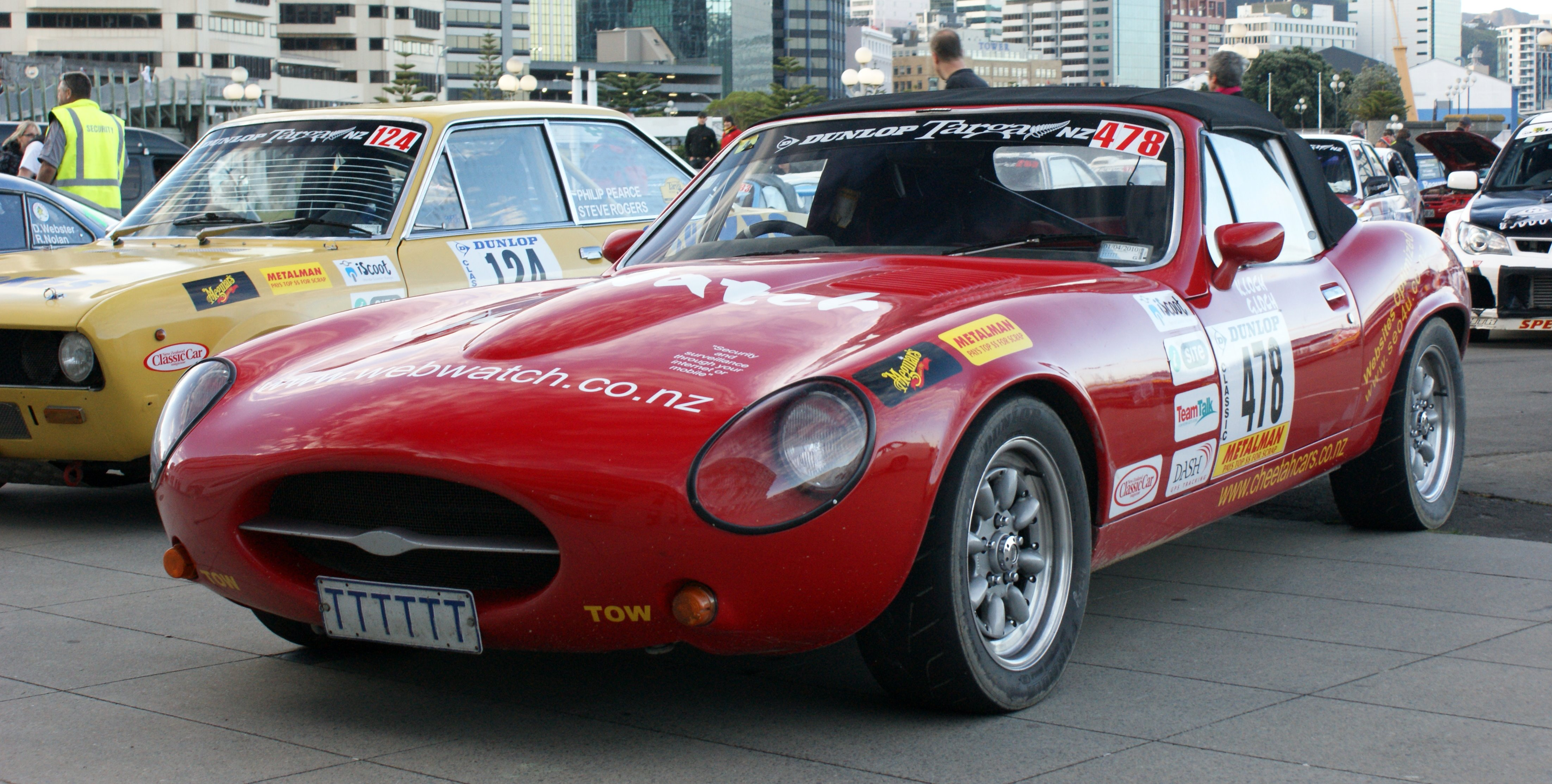
Cheetah Targa rally car

Cheetah Cars is a New Zealand-based kit car company that commenced in 1986 and produced a kit loosely based on the Jaguar E-Type shape. It ceased constructing cars in 1991. This car is not to be confused with John Bush of Oamaru's Cheetah Sports from the early 1960s.

Gideon de Lautour suggested the idea of creating a kit car based on a picture in the 1981 January–March issue of the Australian Sports Car World magazine. It was a BRG Jaguar E-Type S1 convertible that had been stripped of all chrome, had a roll bar installed, a set of lake pipes out the side and flared wheel arches and was being used for classic car racing.

Gideon had extensive experience working on exotic machinery in the United Kingdom.

The body style was to be based on the E-Type with Triumph 2000/2500 chassis and running gear. The HQ Holden was suggested as a better option because they were plentiful and cheap. Also, there were numerous variants from six cylinders to 350 V8s. The running gear was robust and the brakes exceptional for the period. The track was a little wider than the S1/S2 E type. Maximising the use of the donor vehicle for parts was also a key factor. Work started in 1986 in Gideon's garage with the purchase of an HQ which was stripped for parts. The rear floor pan was cut from the body and a central space-frame was constructed that connected the rear floor pan to the front sub-frame. On this was constructed a buck to be used for taking body moulds.

An incomplete prototype was presented at the 1988 New Zealand Car Show in Epsom, Auckland. Some sales were generated as was a lot of skepticism.

During construction of the first car fibreglass sills, doors, and windscreen surround were decided upon to reduce the workload. Tron Cars on Auckland's North Shore were given the task of mould making due to their quality work on a Lamborghini Countach replica and an RX7 based car called the Mountach. Two more vehicles were sold during this period and delivered in 1989 as rolling chassis. Also, four chassis were made for the Company Directors to test and improve the assembly manual.

Three events had a negative impact on the company. The 1987 share market collapse, the changed rules in 1989 for importing second hand vehicles, and rumours about possible changes to Government regulations that could add considerable cost to building a kit car. These rumours later proved incorrect but in the interim all kit car sales plummeted.

The Directors decided to close down the operation in 1990, sell the prototype and see how the market performed. The existing chassis were taken away and completed by the Directors.

Before the operation closed an order was received from Australia. The kit was completed and sent to Launceston, Tasmania in November 1991. In total 9 vehicles were made.

- 1 Prototype Currently being used as an NZ Targa competition vehicle
- 2 Road registered, complete
- 3 The current owner has installed a Nissan 3.0 straight six engine in the vehicle and to be road registered again
- 4 Road registered
- 5 Director's car, Road registered, complete
- 6 Director's car, Road registered, complete
- 7 Was road registered. Current status unknown
- 8 Director's car, chassis destroyed for R&D, body kit only
- 9 Exported to Australia. Current status unknown

Due to increased interest in the Cheetah, the company is seeking expressions of interest from parties interested in manufacturing and marketing the vehicle again.

=== Chevron ===
Chevron Engineering Specialties Ltd is a New Zealand-based kit-car and race-car manufacturer owned by Dan, Evan, and Barbara Fray, founded in 1980. It is based in Massey, Auckland and manufactures three different models, with the Aprisa and Cypher competing in New Zealand sports car racing.

=== Ching ===
Alan Watson of Auckland designed and made the prototype sports car in the mid-1950s. Its shape was similar to the Jaguar C type.

In 1957 he sold the car to Noel Ching of Nelson. Ching is believed to have built a further four of these cars which used Ford 10 engines. There is a possibility that Peter Colmore-Williams's company, Sonata Laboratories of Christchurch also made some of these cars. Brain Ford of Briford Sports was restoring one.

=== Classic Car Developments ===
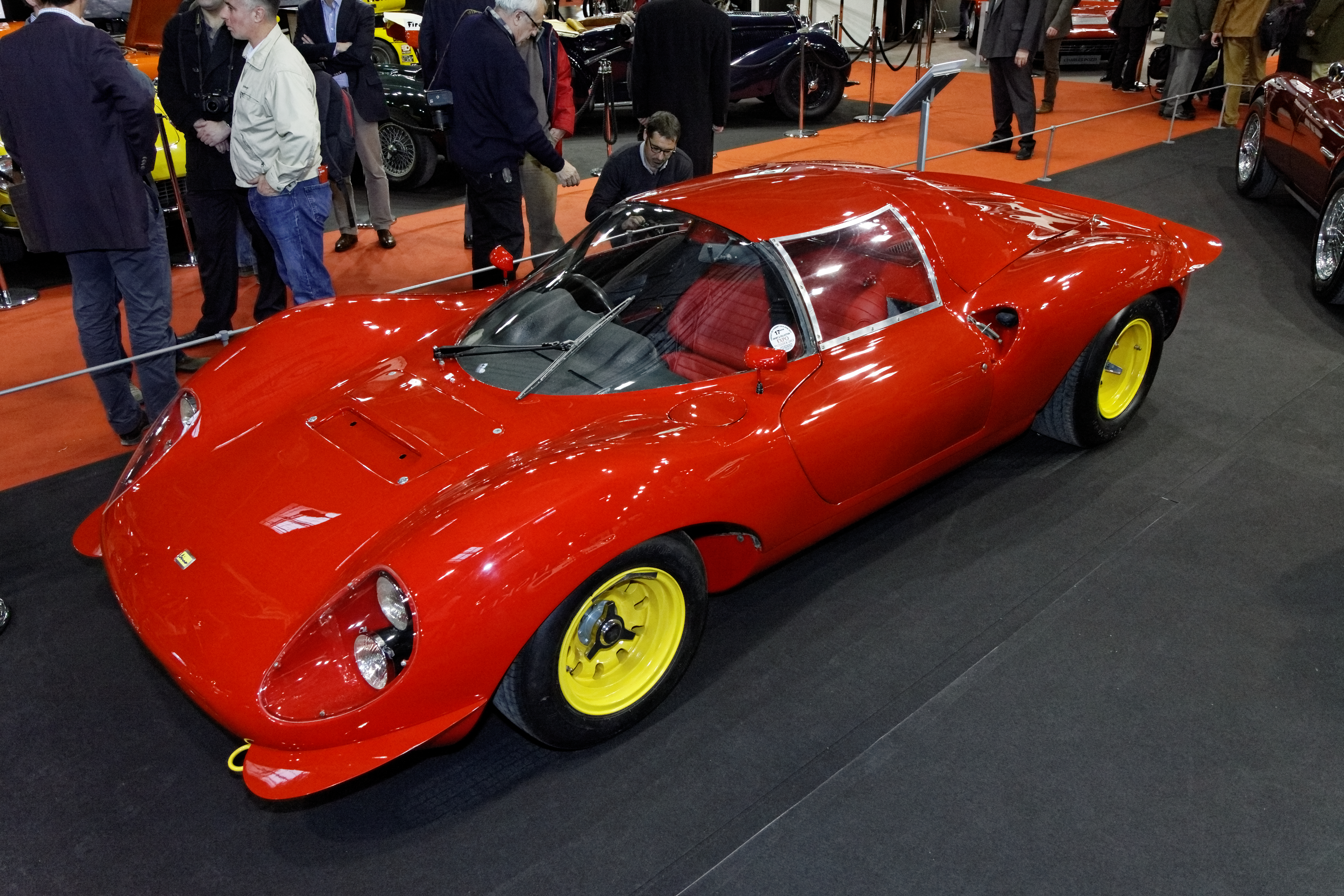
Ferrari 206SP Dino, like the model made by Classic Car Developments

Classic Car Developments is a replica car manufacturer formed in 1992 and based in Invercargill, New Zealand, owned by Dave Brown. Brown was an aircraft engineer and automotive machinist. He was noted for his attention to detail and the level of accuracy in his replicas.

Classic Car Developments builds individual replica cars to order. These have primarily been Jaguar C types and Ford GT40's. Up to 2009 the company had built 22 cars of various types. All but two were exported.[1][2]

Models built to date include:

- Jaguar C-Type
- 1955 Jaguar D-Type exported to England
- Lotus 11
- 1966 Ford GT40. Development of the GT40 took 14 months to complete. It had a steel monocoque chassis built from 20 gauge (1.2mm) steel sheet folded and spot welded to form a chassis. It had fibreglass front and rear body sections, fibreglass doors, and a 302 Ford V8 engine fitted to a ZF transaxle. The car was fitted with Girling four pot alloy calipers.
- Ferrari 206SP Dino. The Dino has a space frame chassis with an alloy body, built by Barney Tansley. It has an all alloy 2.0 litre Dino V6 engine. It was made for a Christchurch, New Zealand buyer.

=== Concept GT ===
A replica Ford GT40 made in the early 1990s and marketed in the US by Awesome Imports.

=== Countess Mouldings ===
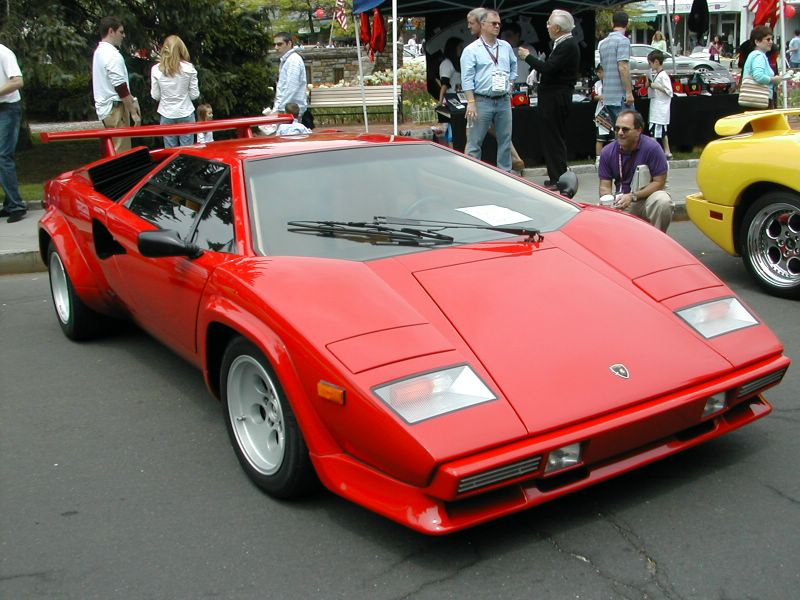
Countess Mouldings made replicas of the Lamborghini Countach

Countess Mouldings Limited made replica Lamborghini Countach sports racing cars in Feilding, New Zealand from 1988 until about 2009. David Short was the owner.

Short's workshop was originally an old wool shed that was used for sheep shearing. It was an average sized workshop, which could accommodate four or five cars. Short often hired extra hands when the orders increased. His first demonstration vehicle was completed by 1989 and was later used for motor sport. His third demonstrator, built in 1998 was lighter and more powerful. It competed in the 1998 Dunlop Tyres Targa New Zealand rally.

Since 1998 Countess Mouldings have sold over sixty kits, about 25 of which were completed cars. Many of these cars were exported to Japan. The cars space-frame uses square tube ERW steel and a built in roll cage is made from chrome-alloy and mild steel. The biggest selling point for these cars was their racing history. In 2004 there was talk of a replica Lamborghini Diablo being developed by Short.

The company was removed from the Companies register on 24 August 2011, its last registered document was its 2009 return. Short is now involved in manufacturing and development of innovative portable sheep shears through his company Handypiece Holdings.

=== Coventry Classics ===
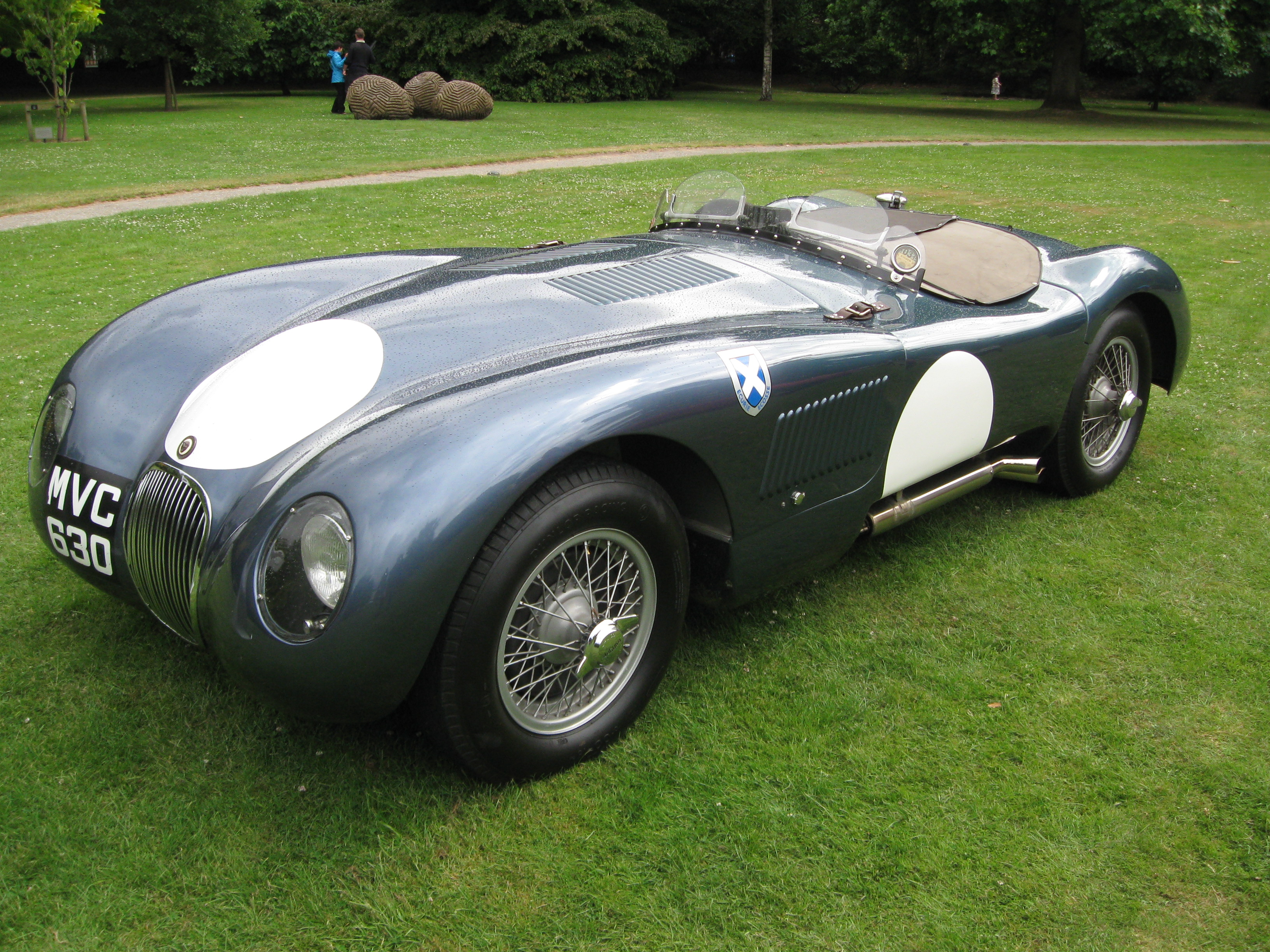
Coventry Classis made replicas of the Jaguar C-Type (image is of an original 1953 C-type).

Commencing in 2002, Coventry Classics Limited from Gore specialised in making replica Jaguar C-Types. The cars have an aluminium body and tubular steel chassis. In 2012 prices started from $NZ165,000 depending on options selected. The company is now in the process of developing a lightweight Jaquar E Type for upgrading existing E-types.

=== Daytona Beach Buggy ===
Peter Clapham's Fibreglass Daytona Limited made one of the more successful kit cars, with 80 being made between 1975 and 1983. They were designed to fit on a Volkswagen Beetle chassis. By 1983 demand had reduced for the beach buggies and Clapham had moved on to making spa pools. He sold the moulds to Graeme Rose of Greytown. Several more were made by Rose before production ceased due to a lack of demand. In 1984 Clapham acquired the moulds for the Taipan from Cooke Brothers.

=== Dixon ===
David Dixon, a former Steel Brothers company secretary, made a Lotus 7 style turn-key car from 1980 to 1983. It was also assembled in Australia and marketed as the JSA. The chassis differed from the 7 in that it was a rigid backbone style designed by David and James Smith in Australia. The prototype was completed in 1979. The initial body was aluminium but this was later changed to a fibreglass one made by Cresta Craft of Christchurch.

Peter Manton Motors of Melbourne were JSAs Australian agents and initially ordered 50 cars. Due to low sales the order was cancelled. About 20 cars were made before the company went bankrupt in 1983. Of these 8 were sold in Australia as JSAs. In 1986 the Dixon was revived by Western Fibreglass of Auckland and marketed as the Dixon Sarasan until 1988. In all 7 Sarasan's were made. Western Fibreglass were makers of another Lotus 7 replica called the Lynx.

=== Escartus ===
A wedge shaped design V8 powered coupe made by Don and Graeme Ross of Challenge Custom Cars; Onekawa, Napier from 1978 to 1982. Eight were built and costing NZ$52,000 as turn keys in 1980. This price meant they were competing with Mercedes and other high end cars. The cars were designed and built in New Zealand, using in-house-built parts plus parts from a variety of other vehicles. The engine used was the alloy 4.4-litre V8 from the Leyland P76, and the windscreen was the rear screen from the HQ Holden Monaro. Production stopped after Donn Ross suffered a debilitating stroke, but his enthusiasm for cars and racing remained with him until his death in the 1990s.

=== Eureka ===
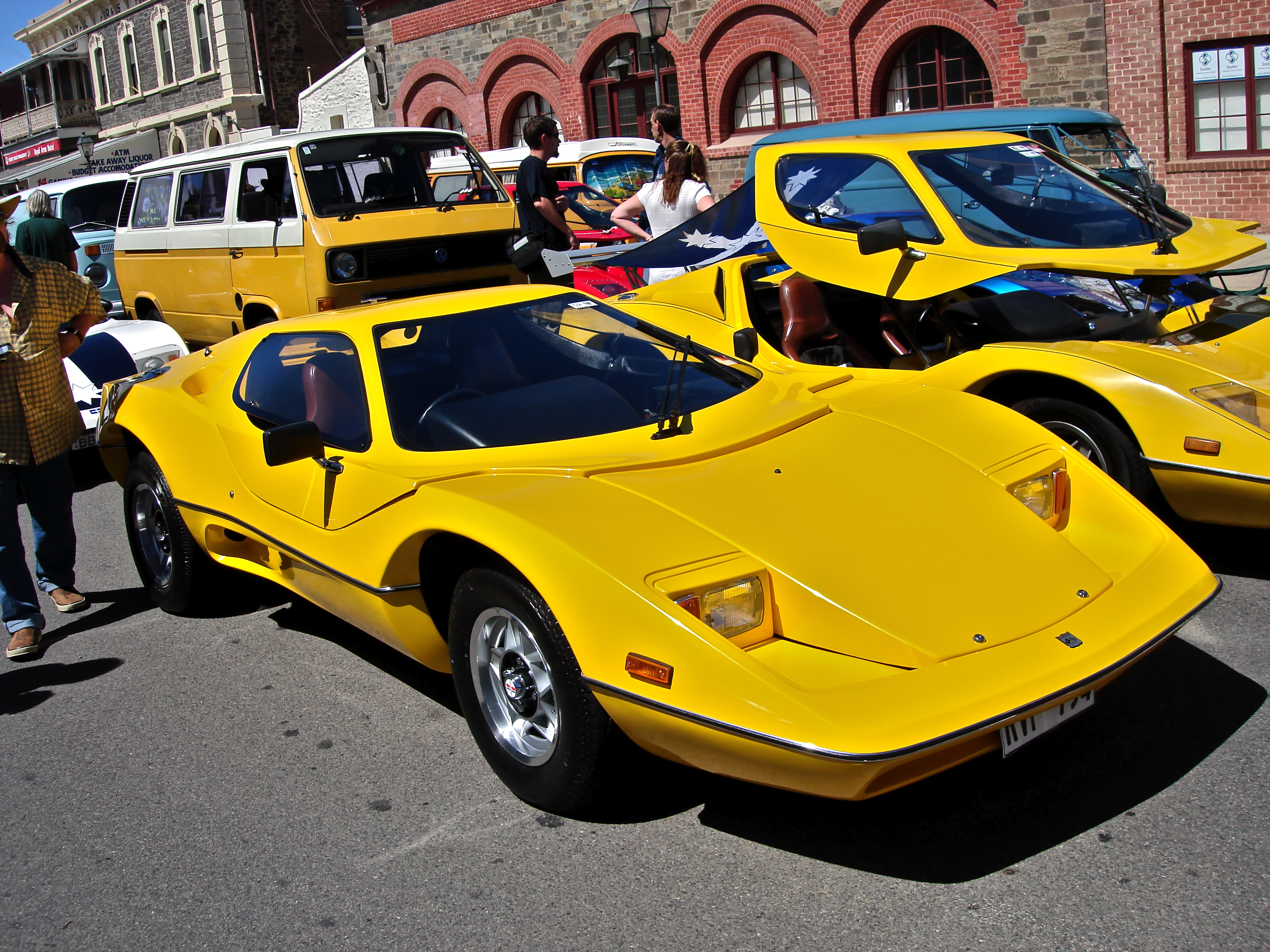
Eureka

In 1977 Eureka Cars NZ Limited was established to manufacture the Purvis Eureka in New Zealand. A car that had been designed by Richard Oakes of the United Kingdom. The number of cars made in New Zealand is unknown although some still exist.

=== Everson ===
In the 1960s Cliff Everson, Ernest's Everson's son, made several cars under the Everson name. There were four Everson 7s built between 1961 and 1964, which was based on the Lotus 7; eight Everson Cherubs were built between 1964 and 1969, which were based on the BMC Mini and looked similar to the Mini Moke; and between 1981 and 1984 the Everson Eagle, a car based on the Excalibur. The final car Cliff produced was the Everson EMW 6 between 1983 and 1989. It was based on the BMW M1 of the time. Only four were completed, with the 5th car being scrapped.

=== Exocet ===
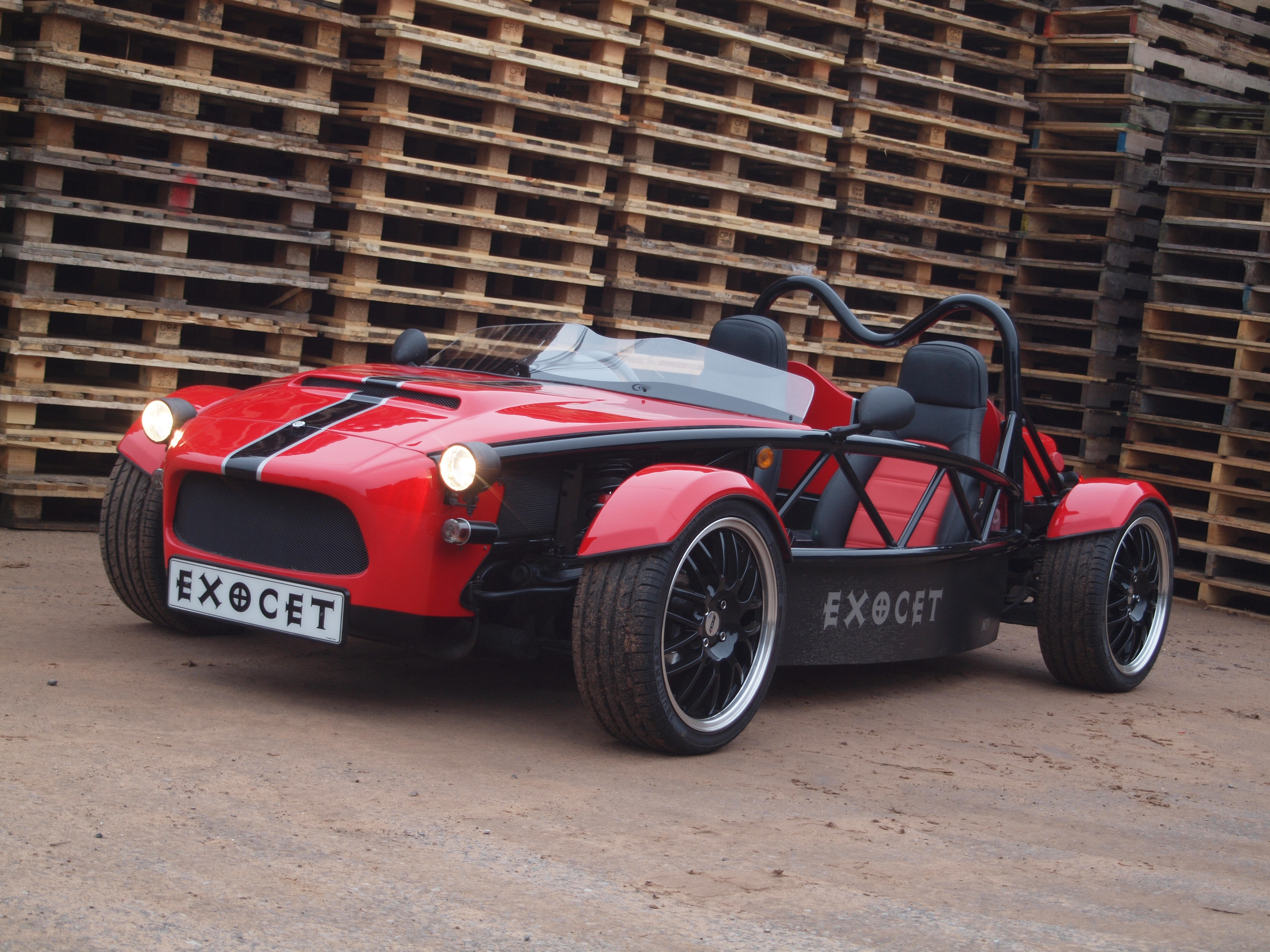
MEV Exocet

MEV Limited licensed New Zealander Tom Carpenter to manufacture its Exocet model kit car in 2011 because MEV had difficulty meeting high UK demand. The Exocet was modified to meet New Zealand requirements and uses early model Mazda MX5s as a donor vehicle. Carpenter sold Exocet Cars New Zealand to Paul O'Grady on 1 January 2016.

=== F10 Special ===
Alan Watson of Papakura had made a fibreglass bodied car in 1957. This car and its moulds, he sold to Noel Ching and Ching went on to make a series of cars from it. Watson then teamed up with apprentices Ron Cox, and Graham MGill while working at the Auckland Railway Workshops along with apprentice panel beater Clarrie Ranby. The four began construction of the first car in September 1958. It had the appearance of a Triumph TR3 with grille similar to that of the Aston Martin DB3. The car was powered by a Ford 10 engine. Four cars built between 1958 and 1961 at Papakura. Of these three were still extant in 2012.

=== Falcon and Tiki ===
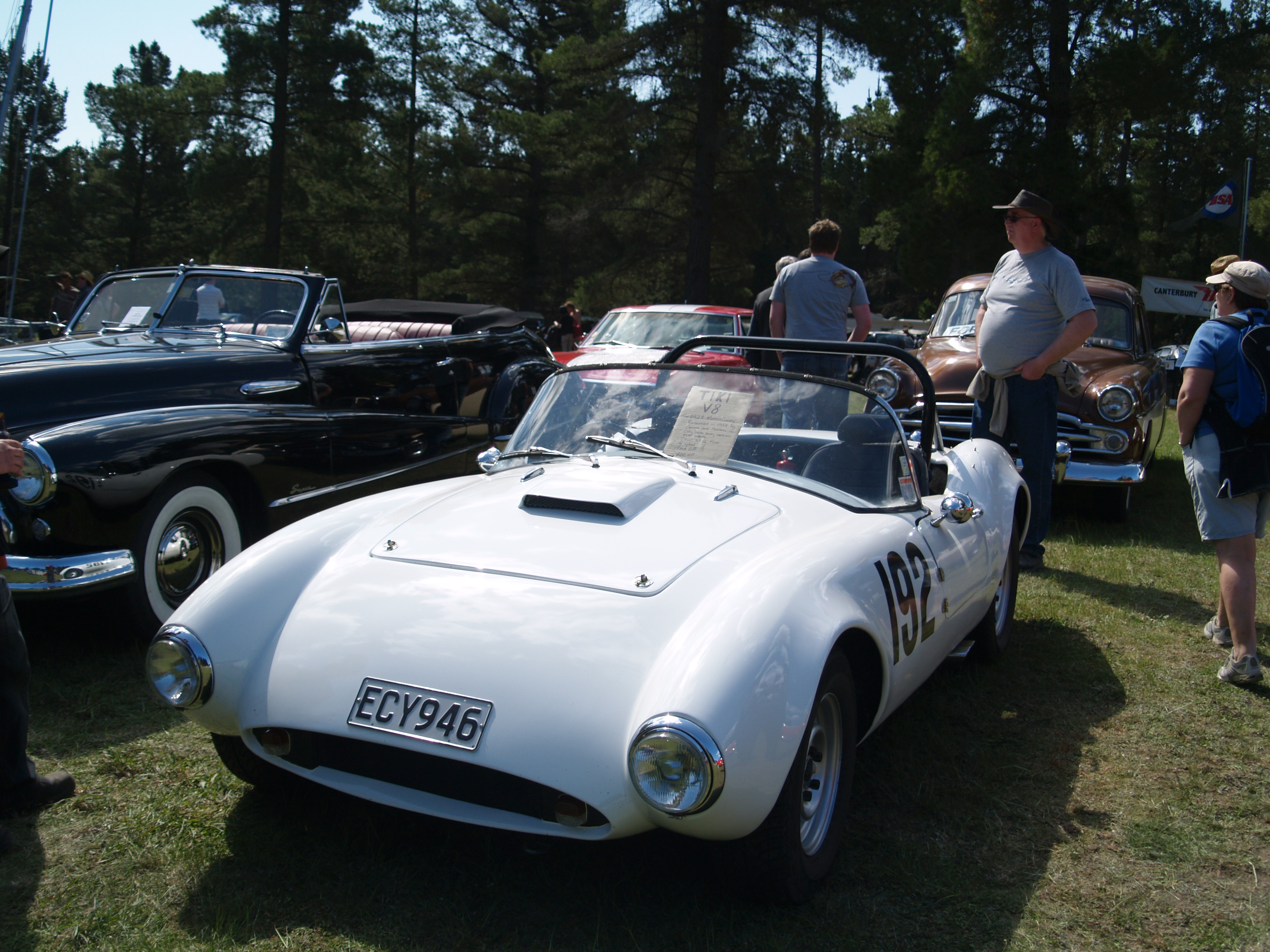
Falcon and Tiki were based on the Ashley 750, as was the Cantwell Puma.

An Ashley 750 that was made in Gisborne during Peter Pellandine's time in New Zealand and marketed as the Falcon Mk 1. There was also a racing version called the Falcon Mk 2. Pellandine sold the rights to build the Falcon Mk 1 to George and Ashton Limited of Dunedin. They renamed the car the Tiki. About 12 Tiki bodies were made.

=== Fraser ===
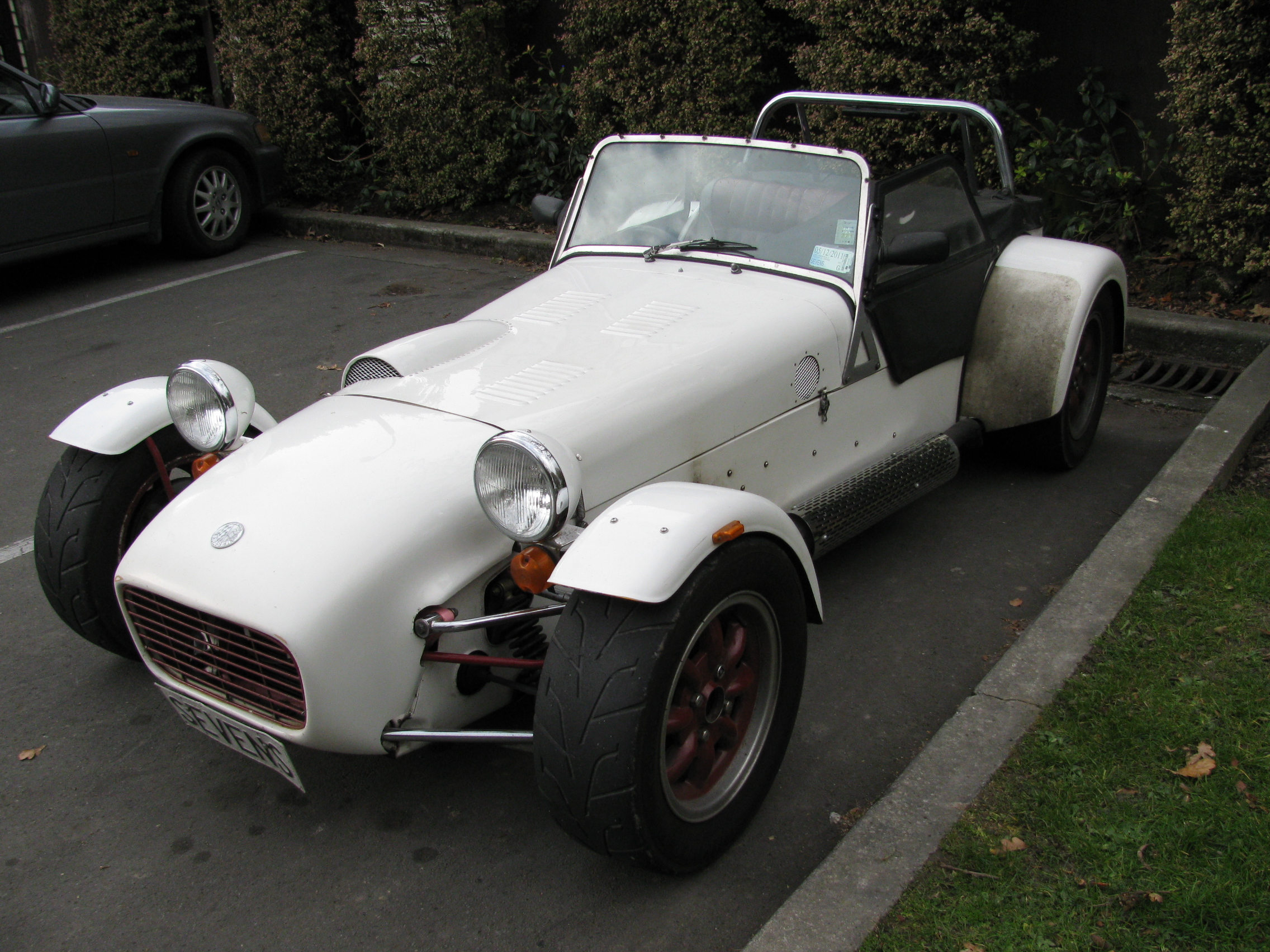
1991 Fraser Clubman

Fraser Clubman is a component based car similar to a Lotus Seven Series 3, built in Auckland, New Zealand by Fraser Cars Ltd. Scott and Ida Tristram are the current managing directors of Fraser Cars having taken over the company from Neil Fraser in 2006.

=== GT40 New Zealand ===
GT40 New Zealand was based in Wingate, Hutt City and moved to Karori, Wellington. They were making Ford GT40 kits for NZ$75,000, excluding the engine. No information independent of the website available. As at April 2022 they were still producing kits.

=== GT40 Replication Limited ===
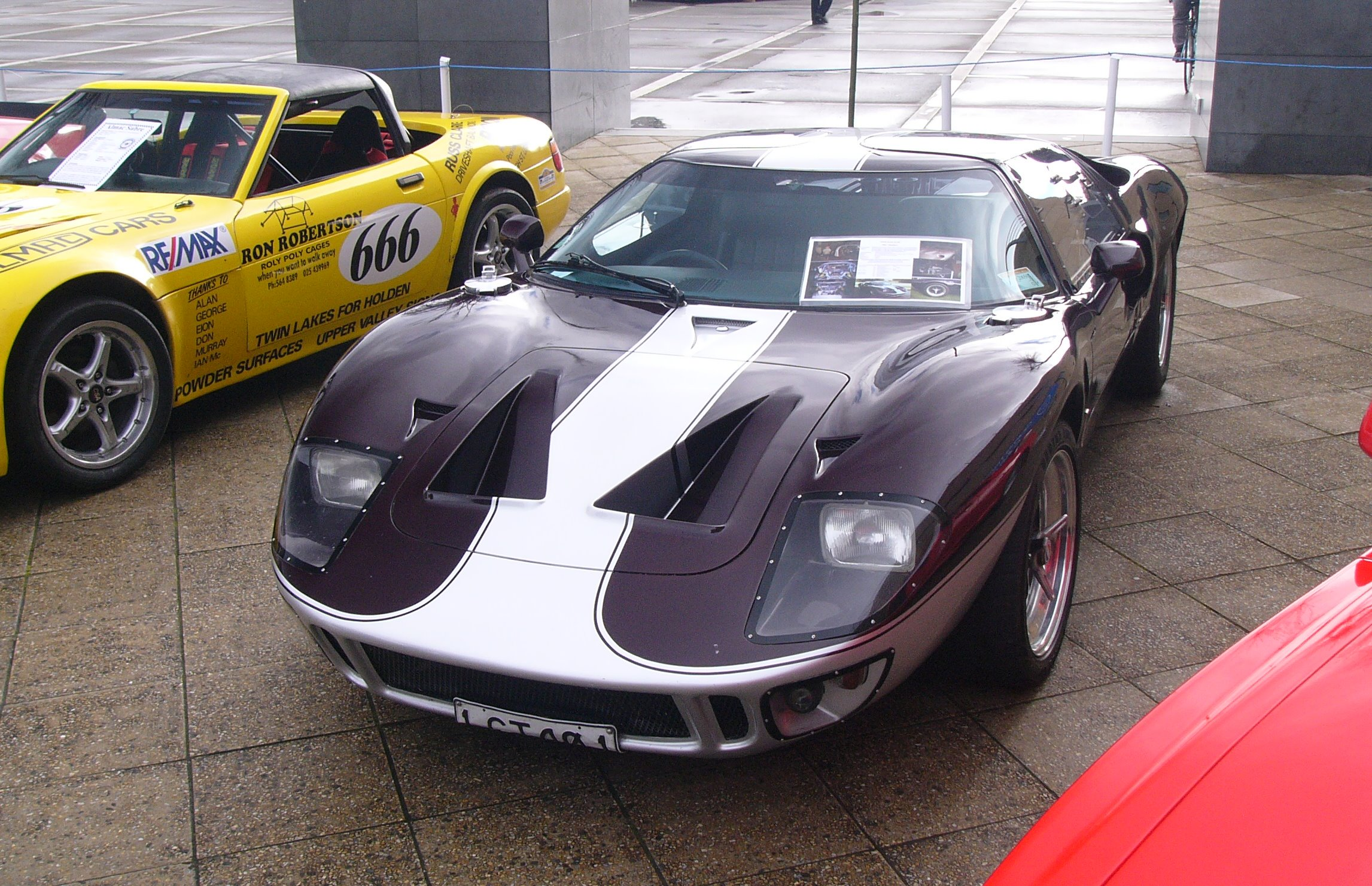
GT40

In 1987 Phil Ware formed a syndicate to acquire moulds and basic kit from the United Kingdom. Returning to England Ware approached GT40 kit car manufacturer KVAs owner Ken Attwell about acquiring moulds to produce GT40's in New Zealand. Agreement was reached with Attwell selling a disused set of moulds. KVA had taken its moulds from a genuine Mk 1 GT40. A KVA Ctype chassis was also purchased to be used as the chassis design for Wares Ford GT40 replicas. After the initial 10 car bodies were built, Ware was approached by a number of people wanting to acquire one. He formed GT40 Replication Limited for that purpose and had Replicar Developments improve the mould quality. Replicar were building kit car bodies called Ibis which were designed for Mini's and later the Wasp, a car of their own design. John Simpson, a specialist automotive engineer, improved the GT40s suspension and chassis. In total 35 kits (including the initial 10) in total were sold, some turnkey. David Harvey acquired the business from Ware in 2002. Harveys holding company was Nelson based GT 40 NZ Limited. This was renamed in May 2010 as GT40 & Lola Parts Limited.

=== Goodwin ===
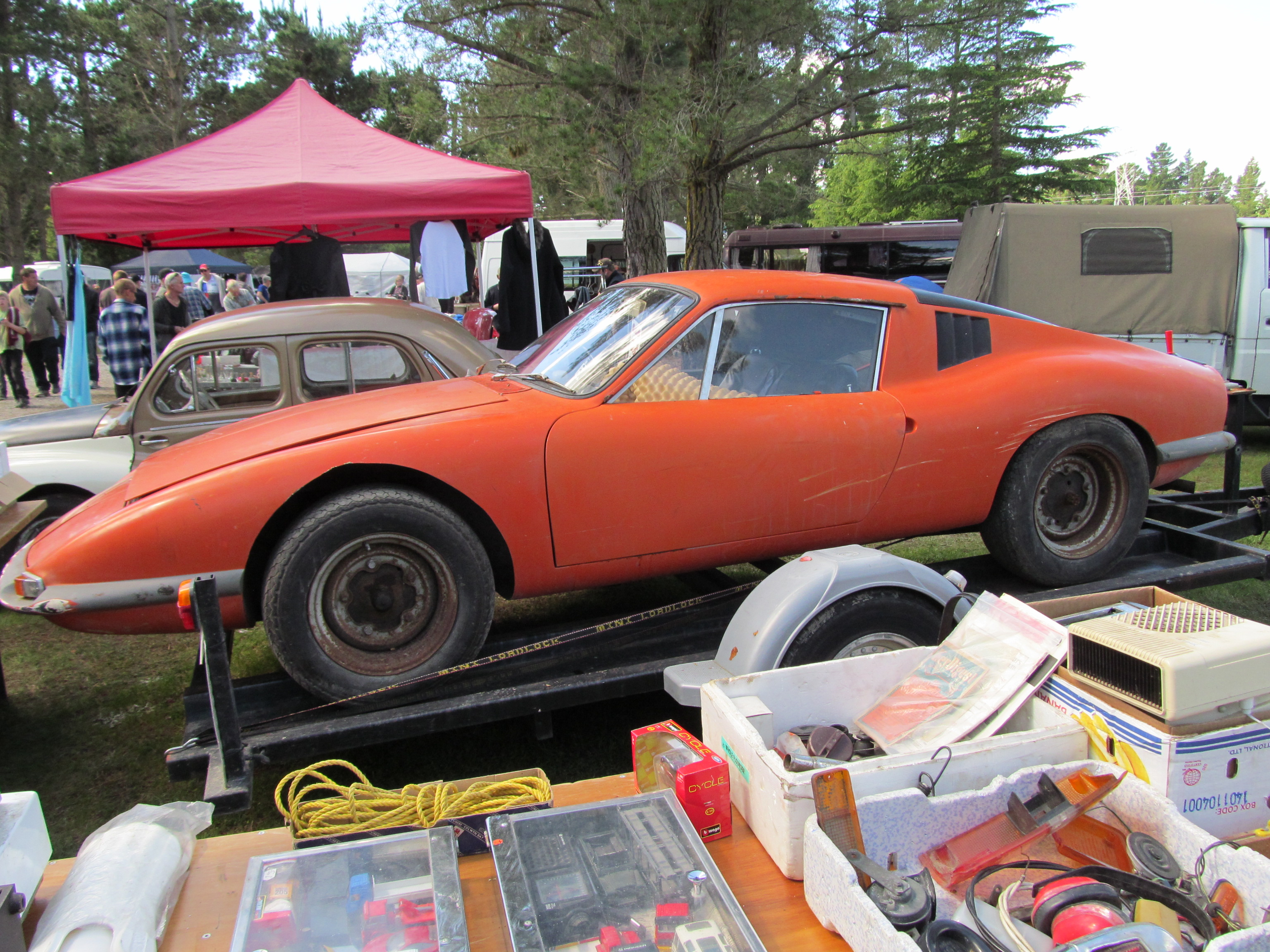
Goodwin GT

=== Graham Berry Race Cars Ltd ===
Graham Berry Race Cars developed the chassis for Almac's Cobra replicas. In 2004 Colin Welch acquired the company from Berry and has continued to work with Almac. GBRC also builds hotrods, specialised racing cars and jetsprint boats. The company specialises in chassis fabrication and suspension work.

=== Hawke ===
See Jarvie and Corsair.

=== Heron ===
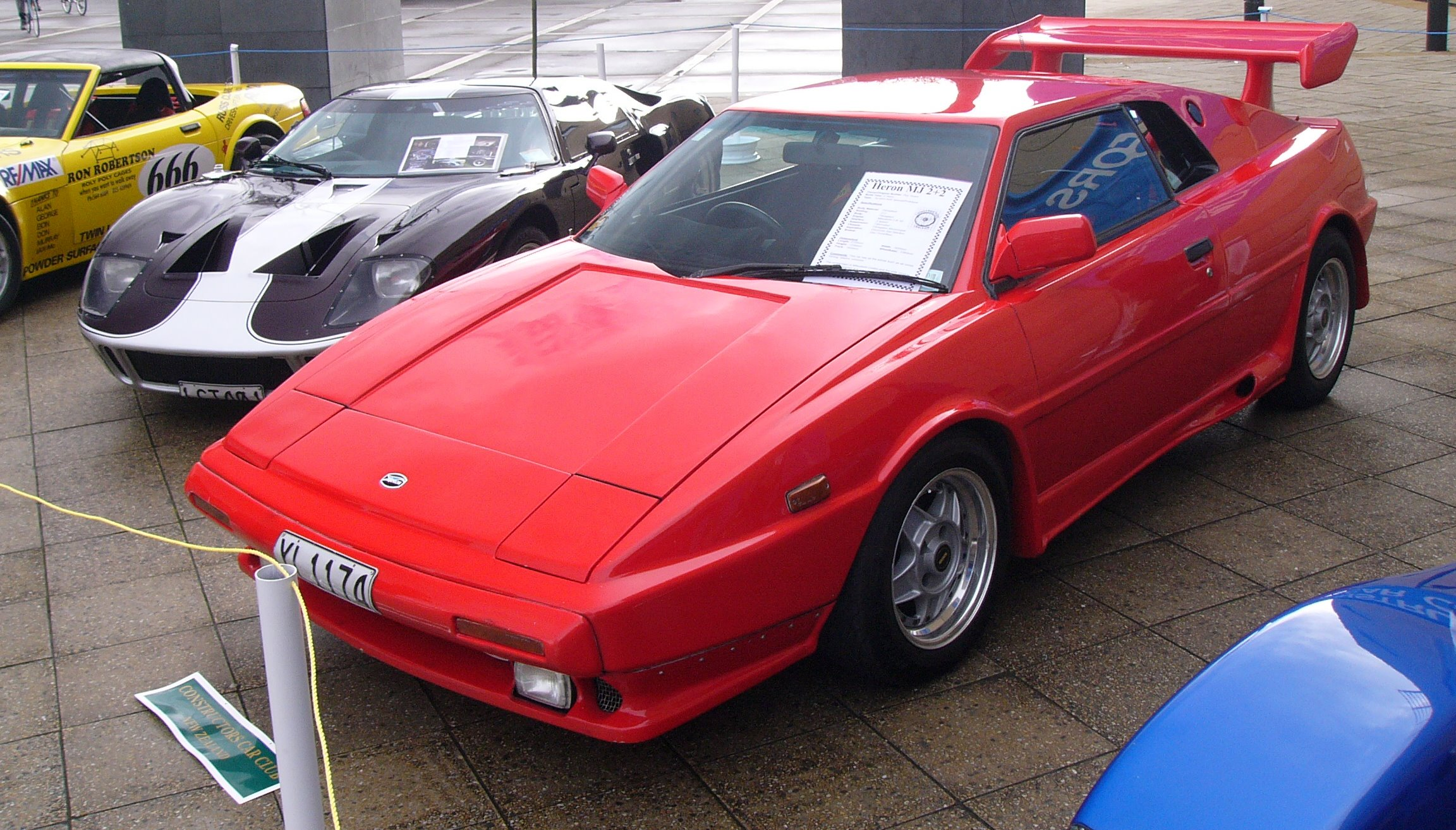
Heron MJ 1 2+2 coupe

Heron Cars were racing cars, sports and kit cars built in New Zealand between 1962 and 1999 by Ross Baker. They also included a one-off electric car.

=== Ibis and Wasp ===
In the late 1980s, in Auckland, New Zealand, a few cars called the Ibis Berkeley were made by Ian Byrd and Tim Monck-Mason. They had used a wrecked Berkeley S328 body, which they widened by six inches and modified as the basis for a mould. After they had made a few mould themselves they had Rob Trainor and Bruce Stratton of Replicar Developments Limited Ardmore make the bodies. Mini front and rear sub-frames were used. Byrd and Monck-Mason sold the bodies as replacement bodies for Minis They were advanced small sports cars that used carbon fibre and foam beams. In total 6 to 10 kits were sold between 1987 and 1989. Some of these were sold to Japan. Replicar developed a new body, the Wasp, which was styled after the AC Cobra.

In 1990 they sold the moulds to a Nelson company that was specialising in sending Mini's to Japan. Some Ibis and Wasp bodied cars had already been sold there. By 1994, six Wasps had been sold, four of which went to Japan.

=== Jarvie and Corsair ===
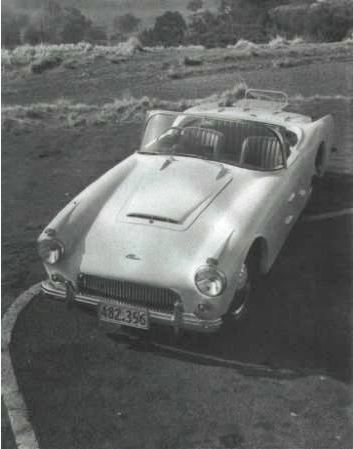
Corsair

A fibre-glass bodied sports car designed and built by Brian Jarvie between 1956 and 1958. Twelve bodies were made by Jarvie and a further three by Reinforced Plastics Ltd of Penrose, Auckland in the early 1960s. Reinforced Plastics remodeled the car and in 1962 marketed it as the Corsair. They only made the one before selling the moulds to Gordon Jones. Jones made two more before Ford objected to the Corsair name being used.

One of the Jarvie's was converted into the Hawke in the 1990s by John Mellelieu of Palmerston North.

=== Leitch ===
The Leitch Motorsport and Restoration Ltd of Invercargill make a Lotus Seven replica called the Super Sprint. Barry Leitch started building Super Sprints in 1986 and regularly raced them competitively in local classic and sports car racing. Super Sprints were originally available as either a kit, partially built, or fully road registered, all with several specification levels. Leitch also make other replica racers, including the Lotus 23B and Brabham BT21.

=== Lynx ===
A Lotus 7 replica made by Kevin Martelli and Bob Bateman at Western Glass Fibre between 1985 and 1988. approx 100 kits were sold. They used a Triumph Herald donor chassis, and John Palmer developed kits to graft in Nissan 180b differentials. Motors were generally 1600–2.0l motors, Ford, Toyota's, Nissan's.

=== MacGregor Motorsport Limited ===
McGregor Motorsport Limited is a Christchurch, New Zealand, kit car manufacturer that specialises in cars based on the Lotus Seven named the McGregor Mark 7. The company was formed in October 2001 by John McGregor as McGregor Motorsport Holdings Limited. In July 2007 Robert Snow and Mark Roberts took over from McGregor.

=== Magoo's Street Rods ===
Magoo's Street Rods are a Masterton based company that specializes in making 1923 Ford model T bucket, and 1932 Ford 3 window coupe and roadster bodies. They also make turn key versions of these. The business, run by Lloyd Wilson, commenced in 2002. In 2008 their Ford Roadster won the Stroker McGurk Trophy.

=== Manx Beach Buggies and Platinum Speedster ===
Following Bruce Meyers Meyers Manx design, Louis Treweek began building beach buggies in New Zealand in the 1960s. He sold his moulds to Rob Schrickel, an Auckland-based manufacturer in 2003. 35 had been sold by 2012. As at 2021 the Manx remains in production. The long wheelbase 2+2 Manx buggy moulds were made in 2006.

Rob Schrickel had made a Porsche 356 Speester replica called the Platinum Speedster between 1999 and 2003. 12 were sold, of which six were turnkey. Rob Schrickel has the 356 speedster back in production now.

=== Mararn ===
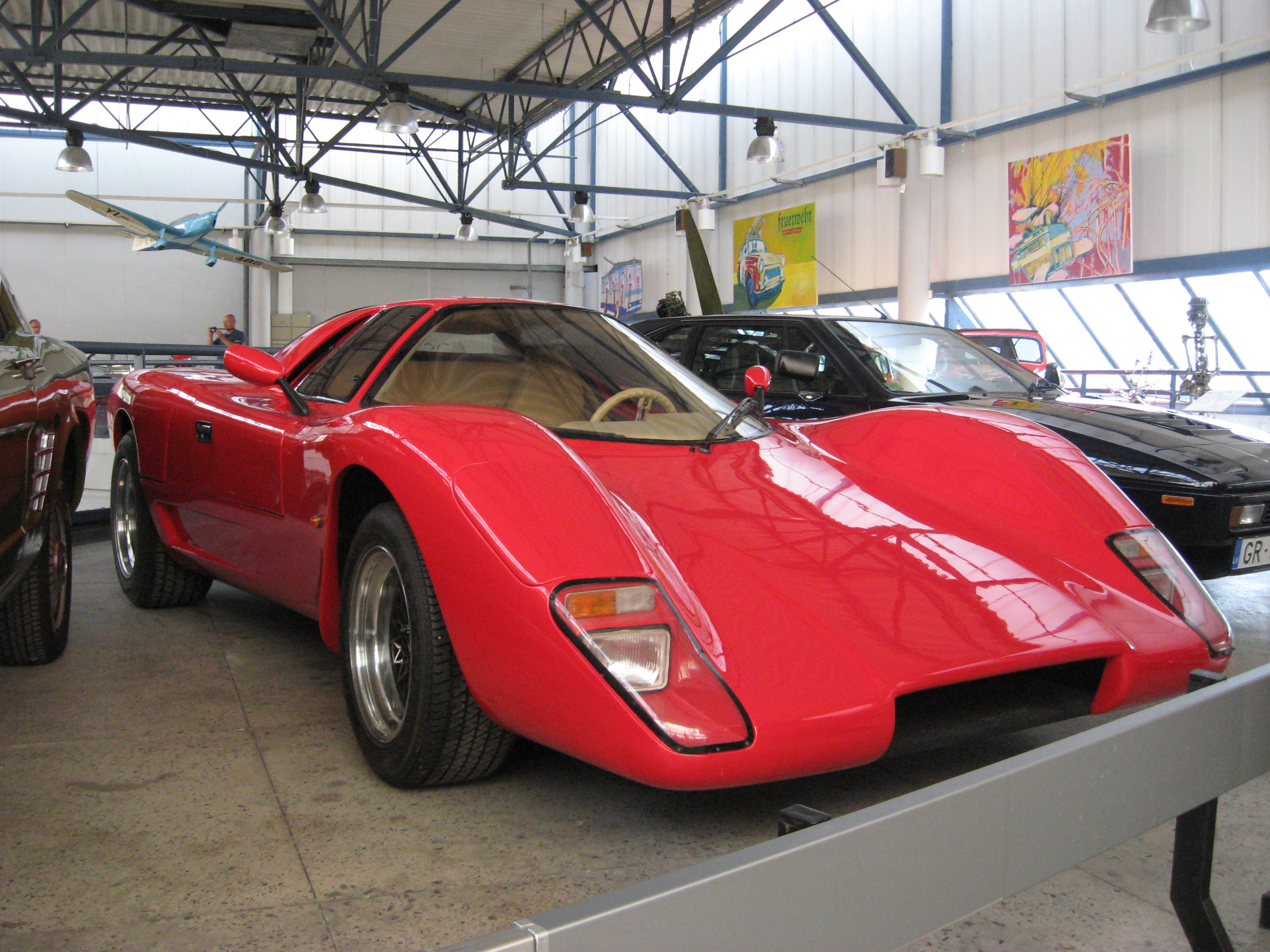
Manta Monage on which the Mararn is based

Graham McRae imported a replica McLaren M6B made by US based Manta Cars and called the Montage. McRae approached David Harrod of Fibreglass Developments Limited (FDL) of Bunnythorpe in the late 1970s to make a mould of the Montage. McRae intended to build and sell the cars in New Zealand. Harrod set about making the moulds and redesigned the doors, front headlight position, lowered the seat mounts. McRae sold his interest to Harrod as he had been offered a mechanic position with US Skoal Bandit racing team of Paul Newman. McLaren were approached for consent to build the car as its design was subject to their patents. They refused, but as their patent ran out in 1981 Harrod was free to build and sell the cars. A total of 37 cars were built with 4 being sold in Australia. Harrod left for Australia in 1982 and Steve Bond took over.

In 1985 Kent Taylor-Reid of Gemini Plastics obtained a franchise from FDL to make the Mararn. Four cars were made by Gemini. In 1998 the moulds were sold to Bruce Turnbull. In 2005 he sold the moulds to a Dutch kit car collector.

=== Mistral ===
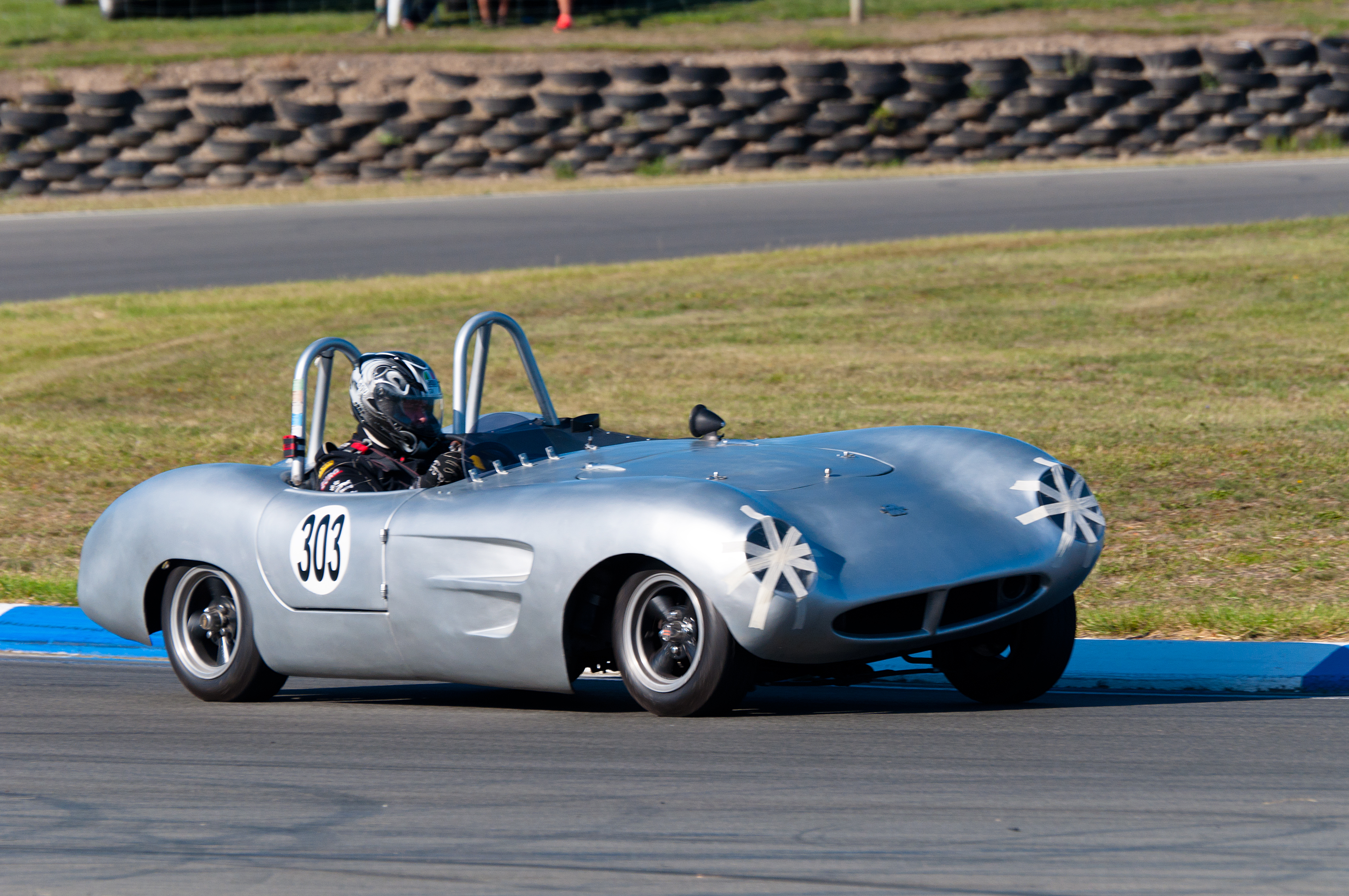
Mistral

A British kitcar brought to New Zealand by Christchurch boat builder and racing driver, Bob Blackburn. Blackburn, and manufactured by Weltex Plastics Limited. The car used a Graeme Dennison designed chassis. Originally intended as a production car, a lack of parts meant it was sold only sold as a kit car. About 10 cars were completed by Weltex and 10 bodies sold between 1956 and 1961. A Dunedin company, Emslie and Flockton Limited, also made and sold the Mistral under licence after Blackburn had moved to Australia, possibly with Weltex's mould. A number of these cars are still in existence and Emslie and Flockton's mould is also believed to still exist. One of the Weltex Mistral bodies was fitted to the Stanton Special, which set the New Zealand land speed record at that time.

In 1989 a New Zealander, Roger Wilson, established Wilson Classics Sports Cars with the aim of building Mistral sports cars for use in classic car racing and for touring. A set of moulds were taken to modernise the original Mistral body. Several of the cars were built and successfully raced but demand was insufficient for a sustainable business and the venture ended.

=== Rhubarb ===
Rhubarb Cars began making roadsters in 2016. They are a skeletal style kit-car using a Mazda MX5 Series 1 or 2 as the donor car. The company was set up by Adrian and Roger Rimmer, Colin Smith, and Bruce Hancett. Adrian, Colin and Roger built sports racing cars in the 1970s as Rhubarb Racing and later, as Resource Engineering, Adrian built the Rimmer Karts. It is no longer in business.

=== Robertson Engineering ===
From 1988 to 1990 David Robertson of Invercargill, sold six Lotus 11 replicas called the Lotas 11. In 1989 Robertson introduced a new model called the Panache, By 1992, when production ended, eight cars had been sold. Of these, six were similar in design to the Lotus 7 but more streamlined, and the remaining two had a single mould sports car body.

=== Scorpion ===
A Eureka styled car made in Whangarei by Brian Heape between 1984 and 1986. The Scorpion had been created using a mould taken of a Purvis Eureka. In total only 6 were made. They were the first metallic red car (VW 1600 engine), bright red (Fiat 125T engine), blue (VW 1835), yellow (VW 2180) and 2 white cars (VW 1835). One white car was fitted with a Subaru engine.

=== Sam Lyle ===
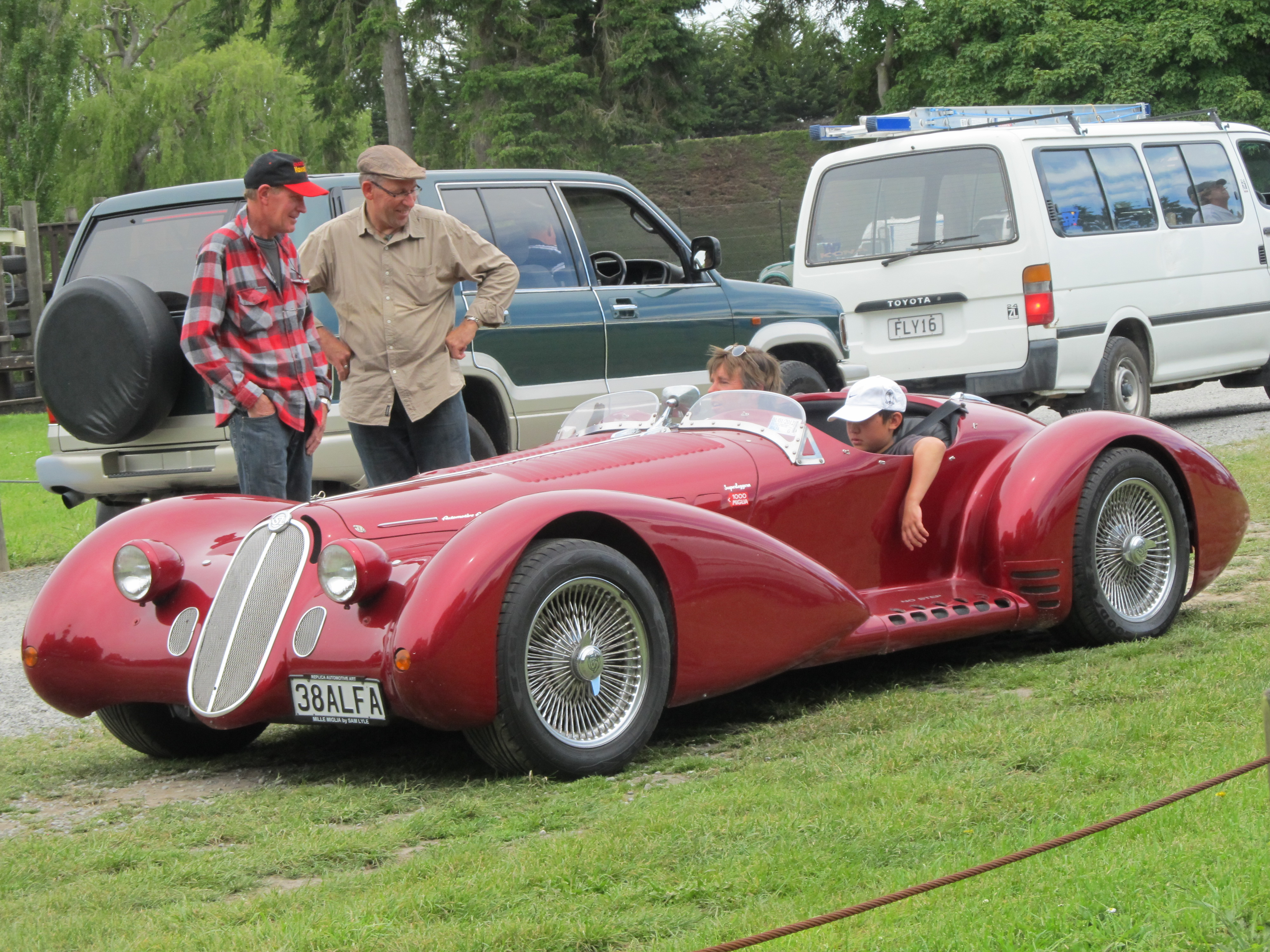
SL Alfa Romeo 6C 2300B replica

Sam Lyle of Gisborne built replicas of the 1938 Alfa Romeo Millie Miglia Spyder between 1999 and 2003 named the SL. A total of 5 were built. Lyle also built a Jaguar XK120 racing car and coupe called the Saluki or Sonic 40.

=== Taipan ===
A small sports car originally made by Cooke Brothers using a Volkswagen floor pan. In 1983 Peter Clapham of Fibreglass Daytona Limited acquired the moulds. 30 kits were made by Cooke Brothers and another 17 by Daytona. Six of the Daytona made cars were targa topped. In 1991 Daytona sold the moulds to a person from Rotorua. One currently is on display at Southwards Car Museum.

=== Tempero ===
The Tempero family started a coach-building company in 1946. In recent time, based at Oamaru, they have produced hand made replica Jaquar C and D-Types, XJ13 and XK180, Aston Martin DBR2, 1953 Maserati A6GCS Pinin farina Bertietta, and Ferrari 250TR and California spiders. Temperos also restore early model cars.

=== Tom Morland Limited ===
Tom Morland of Tom Morland Limited of Christchurch specialised in making various replica kit cars. He made a replica Pontiac Firebird body designed for a Holden HQ chassis. These were sold between 1978 and 1992. In all, 83 were made.

A De Tomaso Pantera replica was made from 1983 to 1990. 14 were made. Corvettes were made from 1986 to 1990. 20 kits were sold. TWR Jaguars were made from 1987 to 1990, Porsche 944's from 1987 to 1990, and Lamborghini Countachs from 1987 to 1990. Eight Countach kits were made.

=== Trailmaker ===
Cambridge Panel Works Limited of Cambridge made a four-wheel drive farm utility vehicle based on a Volkswagen chassis between 1965 and 1971. About 100 of these were made. They sold for $950 in the 1960s.

=== Tron Exotic Industries ===
John Stewart and Tony Miller of Tron Exotic built a Countach replica called the Trontach between 1988 and 1997. They were expensive, about $200,000, and only four were built. They followed this between 1990 and 1997 with the Mountach, which was more successful with 13 turnkey models sold. The Mountach used series 1 to 3 Mazda RX7 as the donor car. By 1997 the Mountach cost NZ$45,000 and was competing in a market where comparable Japanese sports cars were selling for NZ$25,000. The company was placed in voluntary liquidation.

=== Tull ===
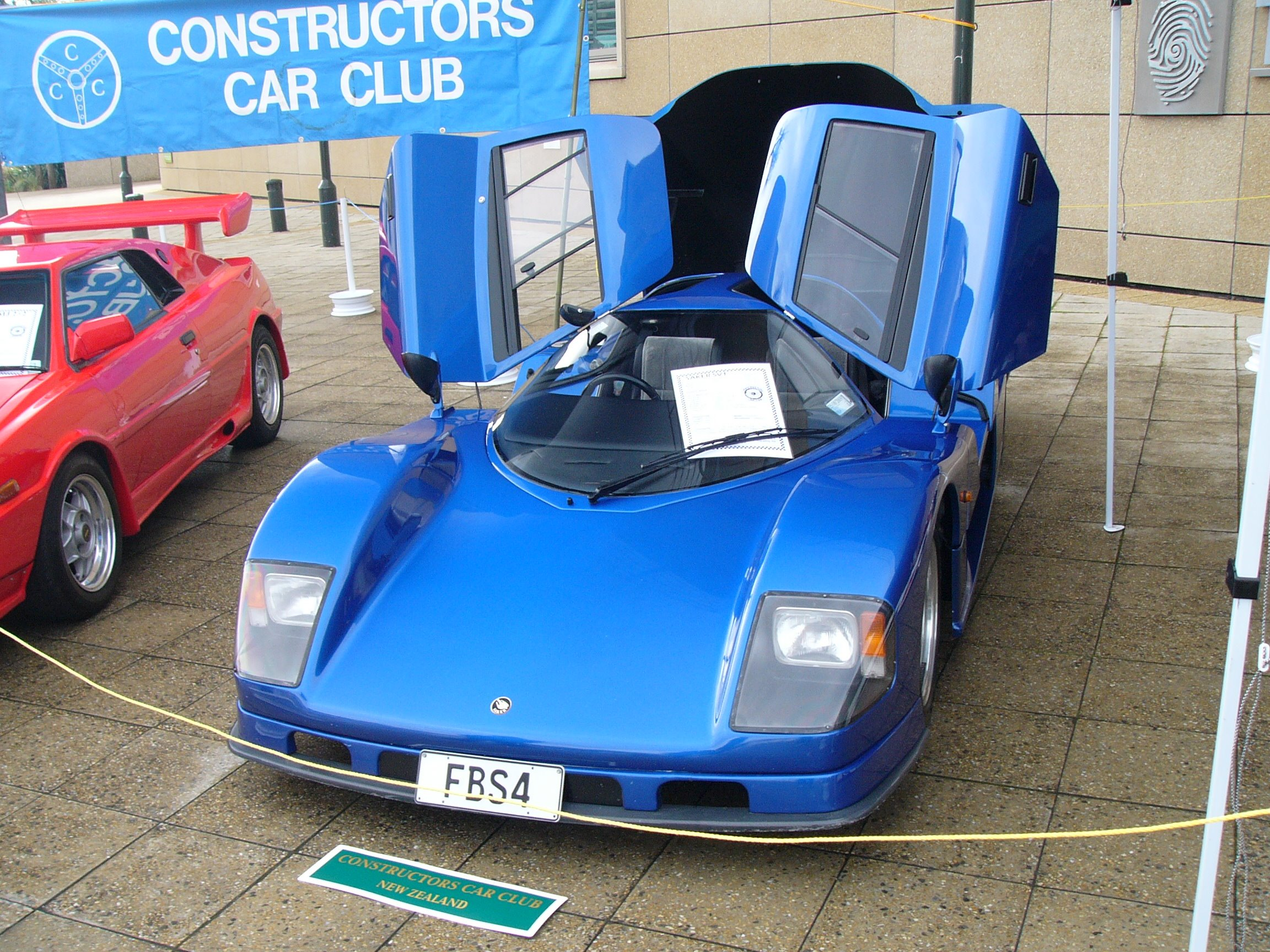
Saker

Bruce Turnbull of Turnbull Engineering was a race car driver who constructed a successful Formula Ford racing car, the Keram in 1982. This evolved into the Tull 84C, which featured pushrod inboard suspension, and then the Tull 86C for the 1987 season.

In 1988 Turnbull acquired the moulds for the Mararn and began to design and construct the Tull Saker SV. These cars are still being made in New Zealand and since 2002, in Etten-Leur, Netherlands as well. From 1992 to 2001 Turnbull made the Tull Sambar, a small farm vehicle built on a Subaru Leone chassis. Eighteen of these were built with the last being sold to the British High Commission. For a time it was the only vehicle on Pitcairn Island.

Turnbull has been providing technical assistance in the development of the Hulme F1.

=== Wilco ===
A Lotus 7 replica built by Robin and Gary Wilkinson between 1992 and 1996. In total 13 were made.

== Clubs and associations ==
=== Constructors Car Club ===
The Constructors Car Club was founded in 1988 to support those who had an interest in building cars from scratch, including kit cars. The club is member of the Low Volume Vehicle Technical Association (LVVTA), the body entrusted with New Zealand's modified and custom built vehicle certification system.

=== Low Volume Vehicle Technical Association ===
The Low Volume Vehicle Technical Association (LVVTA) was set up in 1990 to create the standards, provide training, and support to the LVV Certifiers and produce the LVV plates in response to the Ministry of Transport's (now Land Transport New Zealand) requirement that all new vehicles meet certain safety standards. Because hobbyists and small manufacturers were unable to meet the requirements set for major manufacturers the LVVTA was tasked with ensuring, within the bounds of such low volume production, safety standards were set and met by all low volume vehicles. Oversight is provided by the New Zealand Government's Land Transport New Zealand.

== Current ==
Many of the above manufacturers remain in business, but generally only because of their other lines of work. The demand for kit and replica cars is low. The New Zealand motor vehicle registration statistics 2013 had 2 new Almacs registered between 2008 and 2012, 1 Countess in 2008, and 12 Frasers between 2008 and 2012. There may have been more with a total of 5 custom built, 3 home built, and 415 factory built cars not identified by make between 2008 and 2013.

== Other sources ==
- Alternative Drivestyles: New Zealand Custom Built Cars, Patrick Harlow, Transpress, 2011, ISBN 1877418137, 9781877418136
- Historic Racing Cars of New Zealand, Graham Vercoe, Reed Books, Auckland 1991, ISBN 0-7900-0189-6
- New Zealand Manufactured Cars: A Cottage Industry, Patrick Harlow, Willsonscott Publishing International Limited, 2013, ISBN 1877427519, 9781877427510
- Spare Parts, the magazine of the Constructors Car Club, Lower Hutt

== See also ==
- Automotive industry in New Zealand
- Motor Sport in New Zealand
