= Saker Cars =

Vehicle manufacturing company

Turnbull Engineering Ltd.
- Industry: Automobile manufacturing
- Founder: Bruce Turnbull
- Headquarters: Feilding, New Zealand
- Products: Saker SV1, SVS GT, SVS Sprint
- Website: Saker Cars

Saker (Saker Sports Cars) were designed and built in Feilding, New Zealand, by Bruce Turnbull of Turnbull Engineering from 1989 to 2002. Turnbull has been providing technical assistance in the development of the Hulme F1. Since 2002 Sakers are being built and designed in Etten-Leur, Netherlands by Saker Sportscars B.V.

== Models ==
The Saker SV1 was the first model of the car, entering limited production in 1992. The car was road legal and regularly used for touring and competition. The SV1 was designed to be powered by a variety of engines, including V8 and V6. They were sold in the UK, Japan and New Zealand.

In 1999 Turnbull introduced the Saker SVS GT and SVS Sprint. The Sprint was an open-top version. These model features updated chassis and mechanics. The main changes were to the space-frame chassis, which was stretched by about 100 mm (3.9 in) to allow it to accept a wider range of engines. The most common engine used was the Subaru Impreza WRX turbo flat-four with a converted transaxle for rear-wheel-drive, although Subaru flat-sixes could also be fitted. Both the GT and Sprint were manufactured in the Netherlands, though there was a dispute over the licensing.

A small number, as few as three, of race-only Saker GTs were also manufactured under license in the USA. One road-going Saker SVS was imported from New Zealand into the US in 2004. It was fitted with a Lexus 1UZ-FE 4.0-liter V8 engine mated to a Renault UN1 5-speed Transaxle. Since then it has been modified to accept a highly tuned Chevy LS6 5.7L V8, that produces almost 500bhp, mated to an Audi 01E (DQS variant) 6-speed transaxle. At the time of the engine change the owner also modified the body, headlights, tail lights, and front bumper/splitter to make the car look more modern.

== Netherlands ==
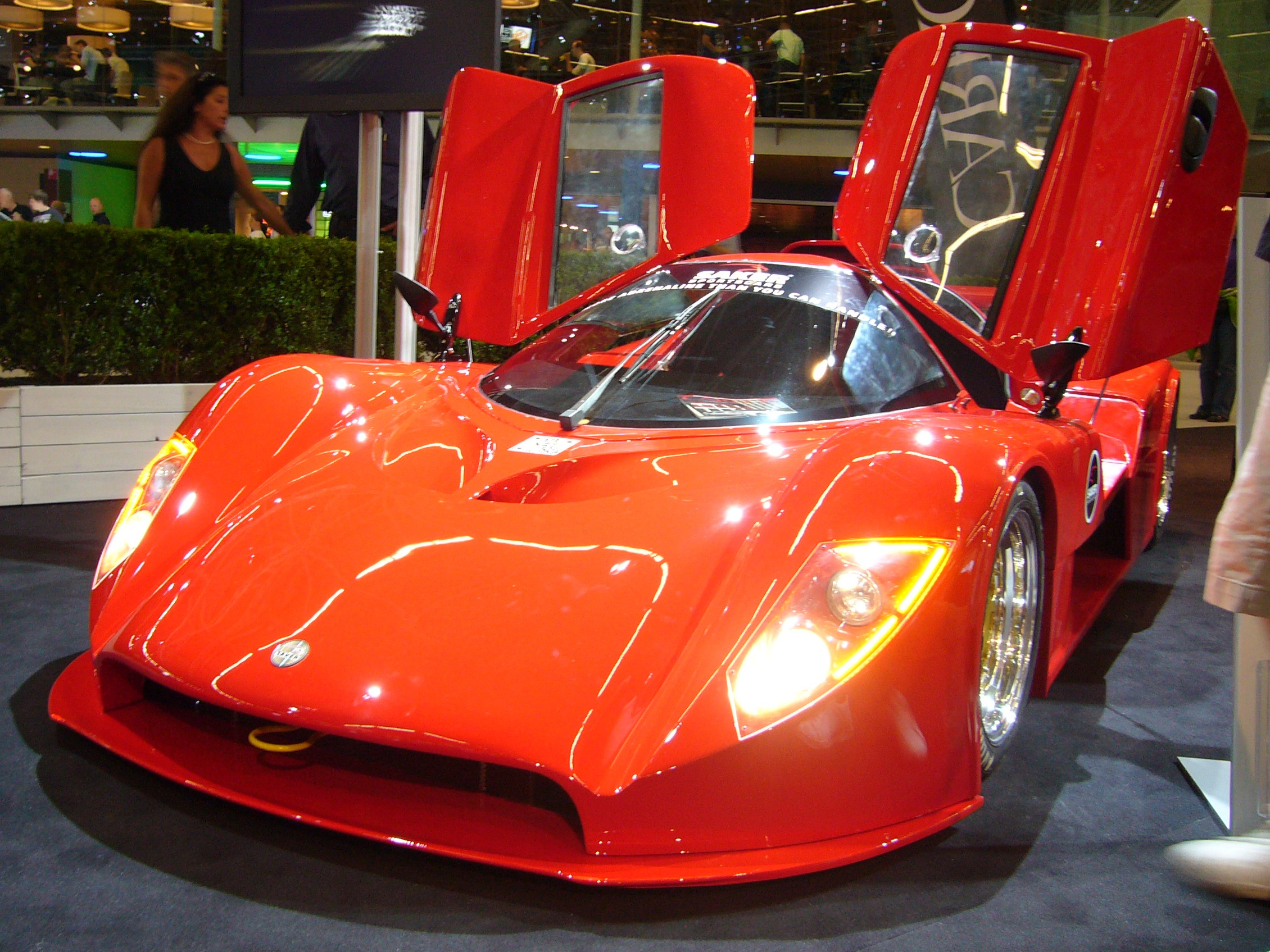
Saker GT at the 2011 Amsterdam International Motor Show

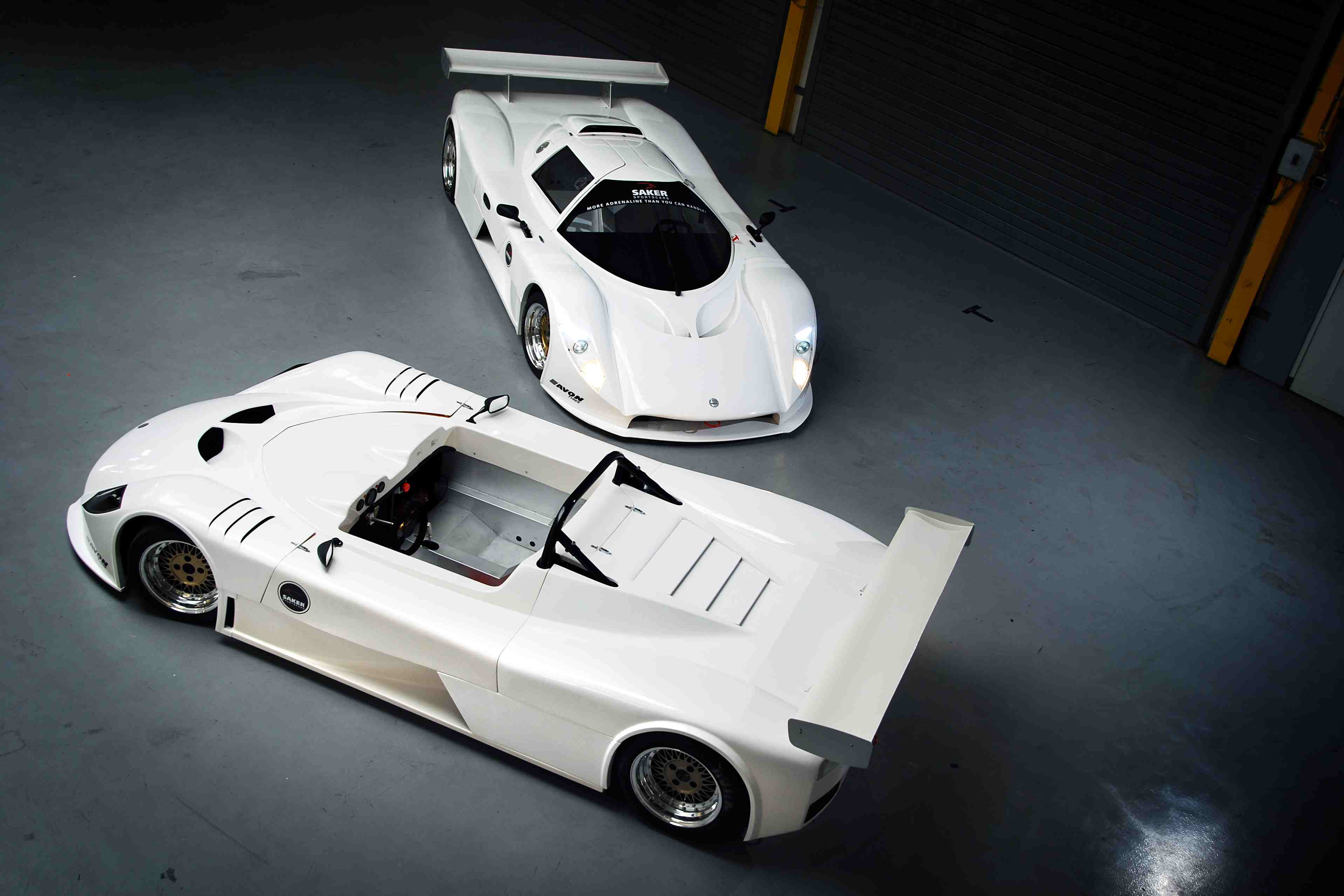
RapX and Sniper

In 2002, Huub Vermeulen (DNRT) and Robbert Visser had the goal of building an affordable race car. Bruce Turnbull's Saker appeared to meet that need. The rights to manufacture the cars were purchased and Saker Sportscars was founded in the Netherlands. The company was run by Herbert Boender with the support of the brothers Laurens Meyer and Gerrit Meyer.

Both the Saker GT and Sprint were manufactured by Saker Sportscars. In 2010, two new versions were added to the product range, the RapX and the Sniper. However, the specifications remain the same as the GT and Sprint with only the bodywork changing.

In March 2023, the company Saker Sportscars was bought by Tobias Moehring and relocated to Neresheim-Elchingen in Germany. There, the company also started producing new vehicles. Additionally, the company regularly participates in racing events and also organizes track days with Saker Cars.

=== Sports car racing ===
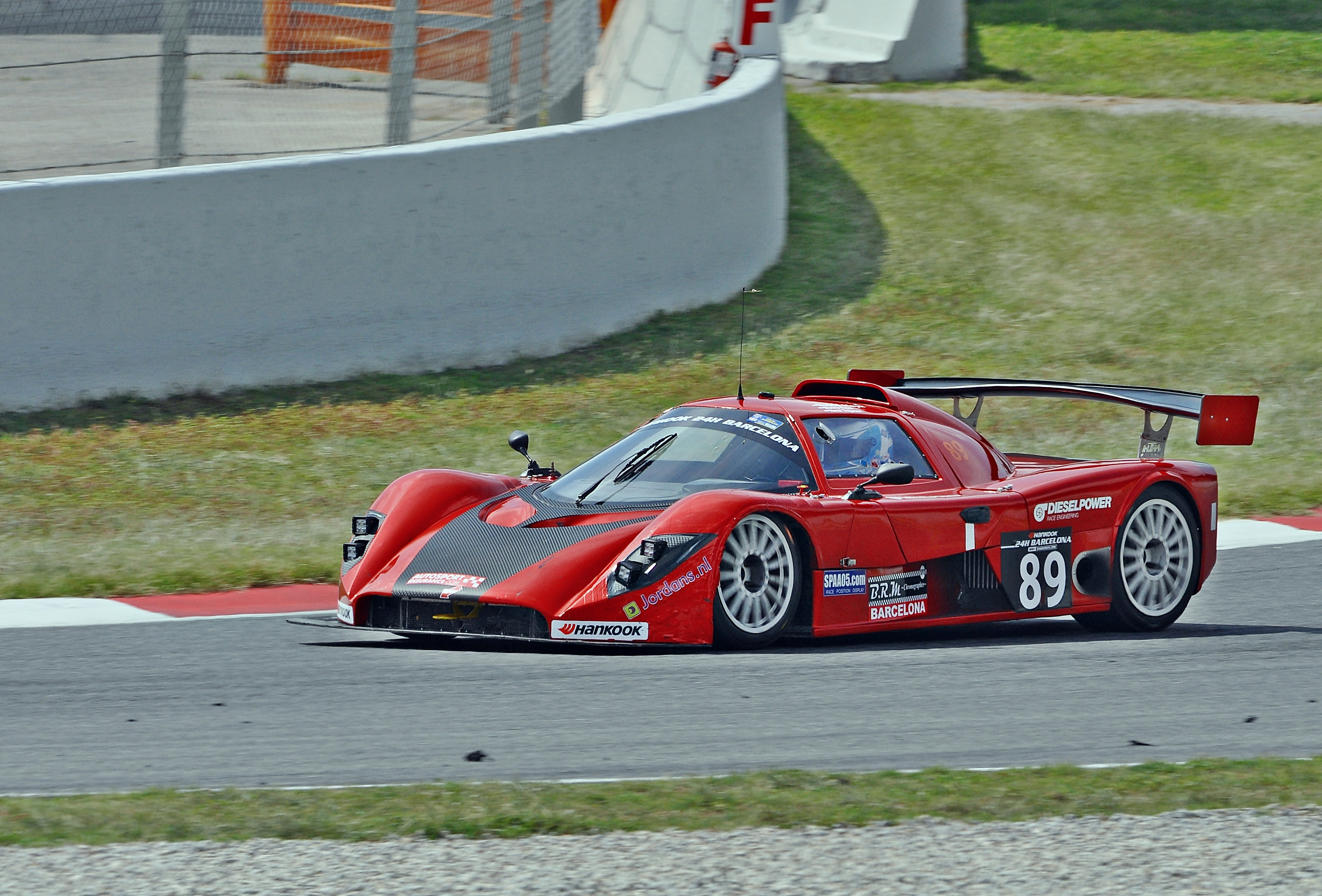
GT racing

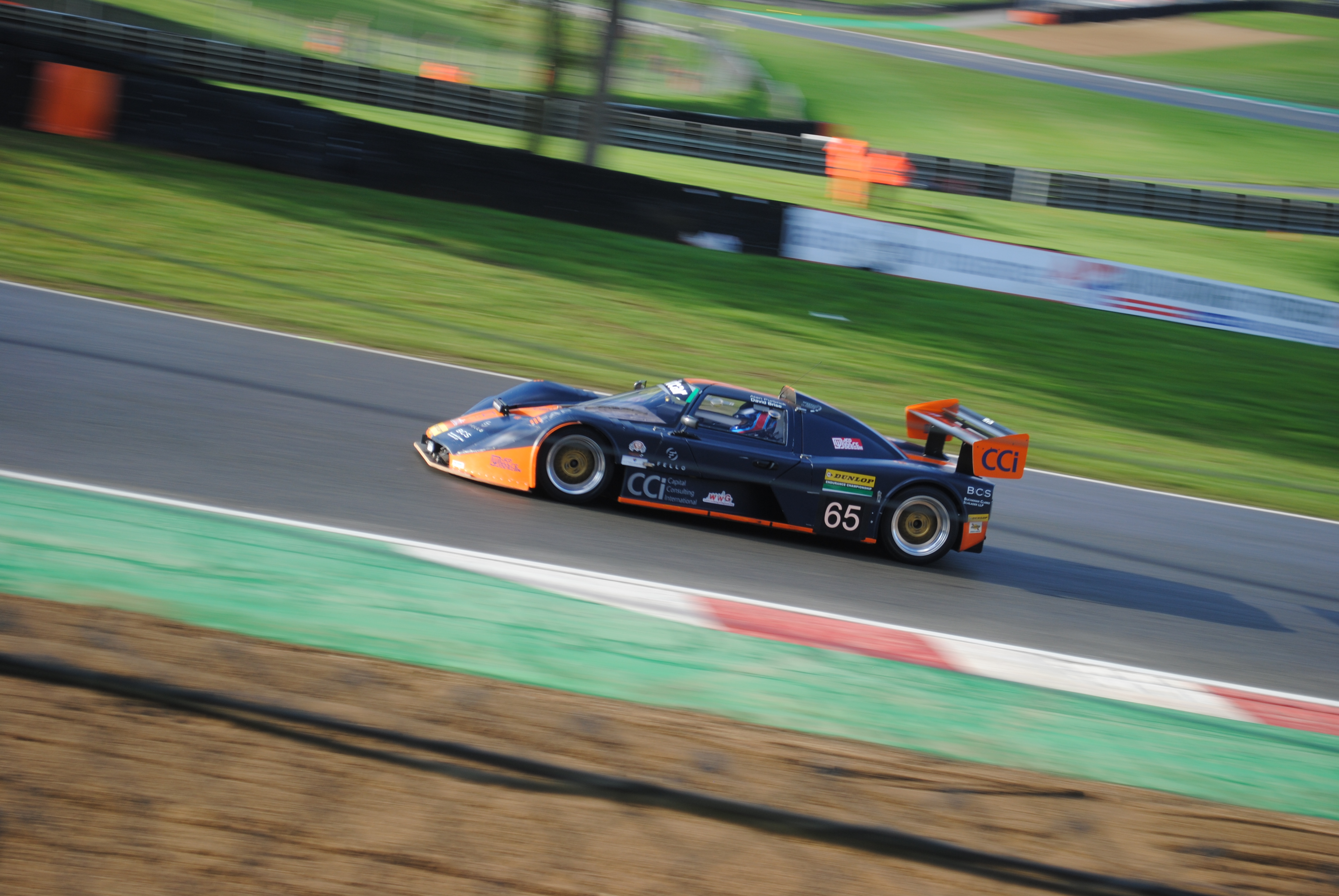
A Saker RAPX competing in the Britcar Endurance Championship

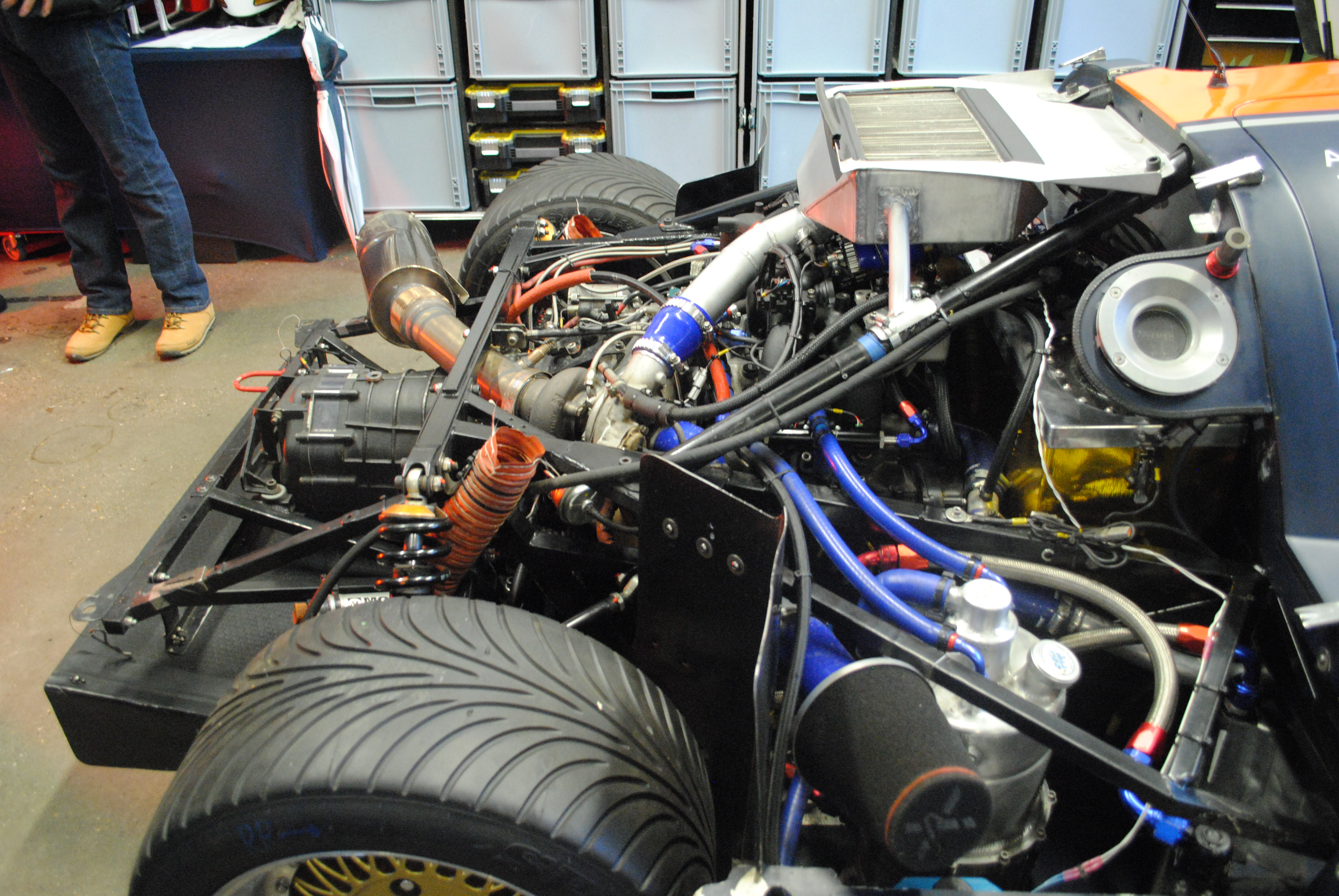
A Saker RAPX's engine

The Saker Sportscar Challenge was founded in 2004 allowing Saker drivers to compete against each other under the banner of the DNRT. The Saker Sportscar Challenge was one of the top of amateur racing classes in the Netherlands. The series races were held at Circuit Park Zandvoort, TT Circuit Assen, Spa-Francorchamps and Brands Hatch. The final race of the season took place in late October at Circuit Park Zandvoort. Judging by the series' website, the last full season of the Saker Challenge was 2013.

Alan Purbrick and David Brise have competed in the Britcar Endurance Championship driving a Saker RAPX for three years, achieving a race victory at the end of the 2018 season.

Along with the Saker Sportscar Challenge, Sakers also compete elsewhere. Sakers have raced for several years in the 24 Hours of Dubai and achieved a class victory in the 24 Hours of Barcelona.

Since 2023, the Sakers can be raced in the Series Sportwagen Sprint. When its more than 5 Sakers, they get their own Championship back.
