= Hulme F1 =

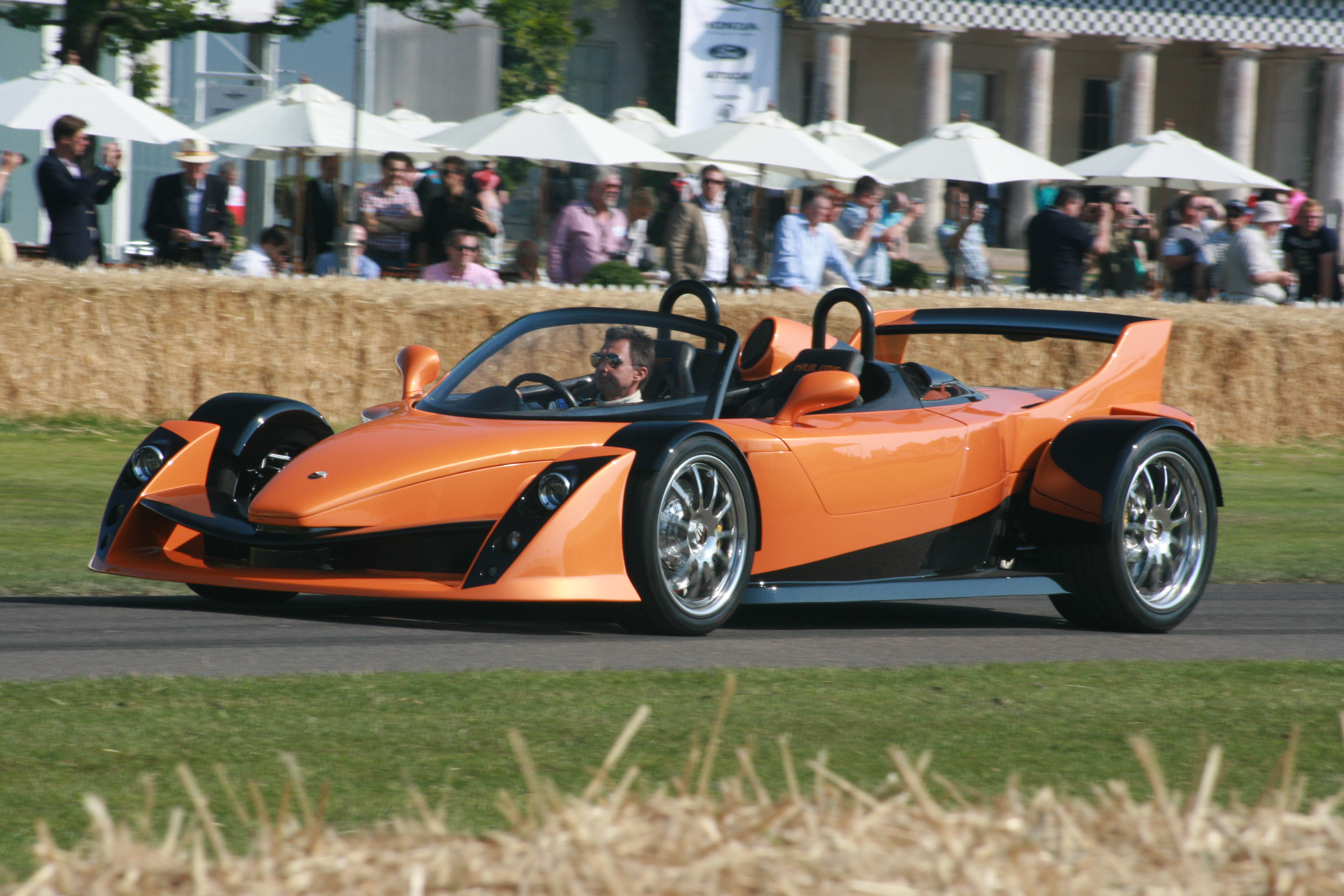

Overview
- Manufacturer: Hulme Supercars Ltd
- Designer: Tony Parker

Body and chassis
- Class: Sports car

Powertrain
- Engine: 7.0 litre (7,011 cc) LS7 V8, 521 kW (699 hp)
- Transmission: 6-speed sequential CIMA transaxle with LSD

Dimensions
- Wheelbase: 111.41 in (2,830 mm)
- Length: 181.5 in (4,610 mm)
- Width: 77.08 in (1,958 mm)
- Height: 43.09 in (1,094 mm)
- Curb weight: 2,182.7 lb (990.1 kg)

The Hulme F1 was a proposed sports car to be manufactured by New Zealand boutique company Hulme Supercars Ltd. Its name was a tribute to the 1967 Formula One World Champion, New Zealander Denny Hulme.

It was to be powered by a 7.0-litre LS7 V8 producing 521 kW (699 hp).
