= Lucalia Clubman =

Australian sports car (1970–1982)

Lucalia P4 / P6

Overview
- Manufacturer: Nick Lockyer / Lucalia Partnerships
- Also called: Lucalia Clubman
- Production: 1970–1982
- Assembly: Tasmania, Australia

Body and chassis
- Class: Sports car
- Body style: Roadster
- Layout: FR layout

Powertrain
- Transmission: Manual

Dimensions
- Curb weight: 650 kg (varies)

The Lucalia Clubman is a Clubman-style sportscar designed by Nick Lockyer in 1966. It was based upon the Lotus Super Seven (1957) design. A total of ten Lucalia Clubman's were produced in the 1970s to early 1980s and were manufactured in Tasmania, Australia. The company was sold in the late 80s initially to a partnership of 4 which over the first year became 2, Lawrence Barton-Johnson (an owner of one of the 8 cars at the time) and brother Rodney Barton-Johnson who had the wealth of building and construction knowledge as well as the workshop space needed to continue building the cars. As time passed differences in opinion led to the company being completely bought out and owned by Rodney and a 2nd car was completed which has great success in local high calibre racing events such as Targa Tasmania.

== Design ==
Lucalia Clubmans are of a Front-engine, rear-wheel drive (FR) configuration as per the Lotus Super Seven with unequal length double wishbone front suspension and a solid rear axle built around a steel space frame chassis.

All Lucalias were originally fitted with an inline four cylinder engine and drivetrain components of Japanese origin.

== Model Variations ==
=== P4 ===
P4 is the standard model designation for the Lucalia Clubman. The majority of Lucalias built were of the P4 specification.

=== P6 ===
The Lucalia P6 Clubman was built wider and longer than the P4 Clubman but shares the majority of mechanical components and running gear.

== Notable Drivers ==
- Richard Bradtke – 1972 Lucalia P4
- Craig Bradtke – Lucalia P4
- David Ayers / David Dungey – 1982 Lucalia P6
- Peter Cook – Lucalia P4 campaigned in 1993 & 1994 Targa Tasmania
