= MNR =

MNR may stand for:

== Transportation ==
- Maine Northern Railway
- Metro-North Railroad in New York State
- Mid-Norfolk Railway, a heritage railway in Norfolk, England
- Manx Northern Railway, a railway on the Isle of Man from 1879 to 1905
- Manor Road railway station, Wirral, England

== Manufacturing ==
- Marc Nordon Racing, a manufacturer of Kit Cars in the UK

== Political movements ==
- Mouvement National Républicain, a political party in France
- Mouvement national royaliste, a Belgian resistance group
- Movimiento Nacionalista Revolucionario, a political party in Bolivia
- Movimiento Nueva República, a progressive political party in Guatemala

== Other uses ==
- Marine Nature Reserve, a UK conservation designation
- McMaster Nuclear Reactor, a nuclear reactor in Canada
- Ministry of Natural Resources (Ontario), a government agency in Canada
- Minister of National Revenue (Canada), minister in charge of taxation
