= Birkin Cars =

South African car manufacturer

Birkin Cars, Ltd.
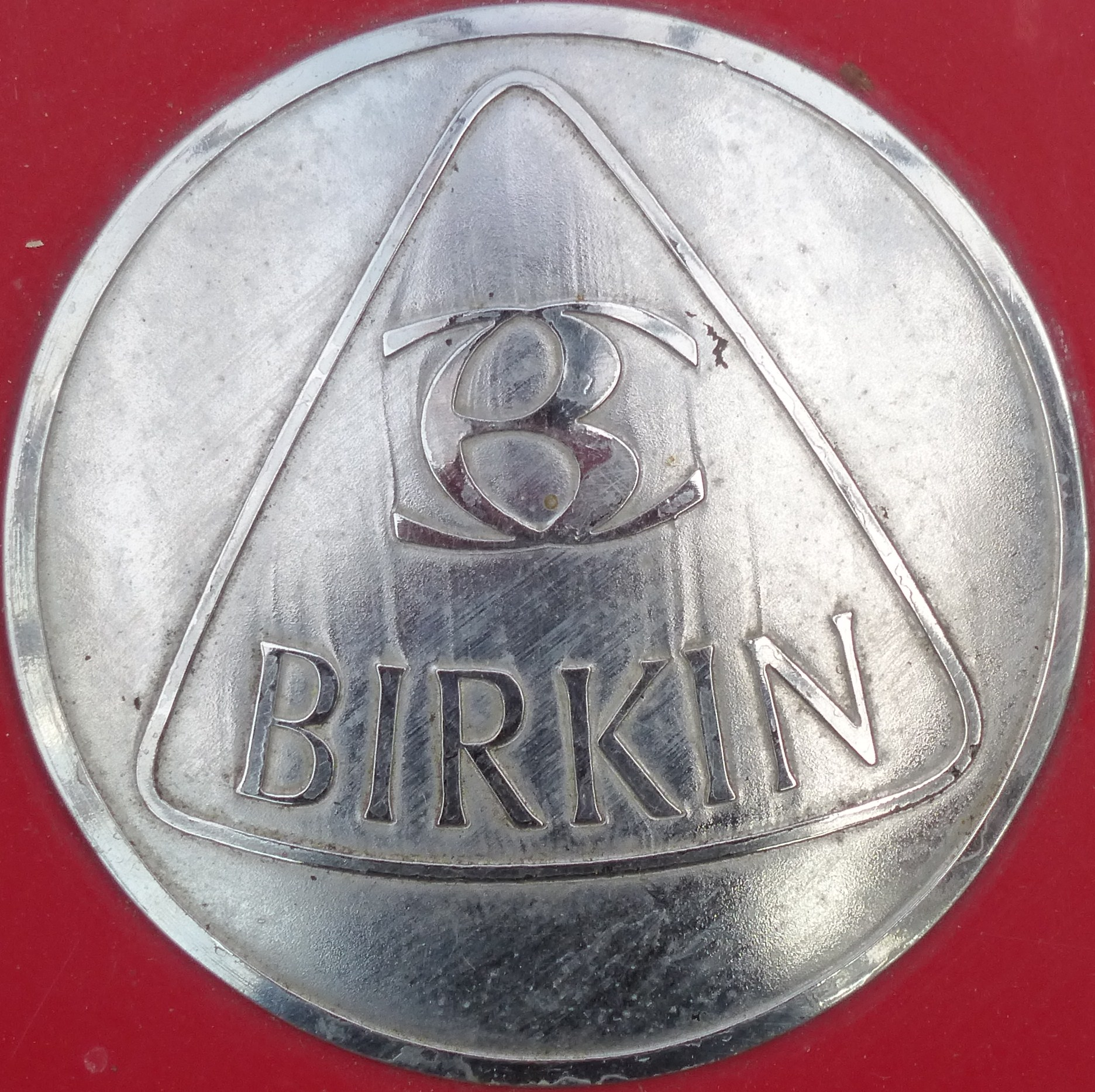
- Industry: Automotive
- Founded: 1982
- Founder: John Watson
- Headquarters: Durban, South Africa
- Products: kit cars

Birkin Cars, Ltd. is a South African-based car manufacturer. The company's specialty and only currently-produced vehicle is the S3 Roadster, a kit-car copy of the Lotus Super 7. The founder and owner of the company is John Watson, a descendant of pioneering race car driver Tim Birkin.

Birkin Cars was formed in 1982. Founder John Watson, an automotive enthusiast, was a fan of the classic Lotus Seven. However, the car had since finished production from the manufacturer and could no longer be purchased as new. Through the early 1980s, Watson developed and built his own version of the Seven. The cars were unveiled to the public at the 1983 South African Grand Prix. The first shipment of completed S3 Roadsters were delivered directly to be sold at Lotus car dealerships.

Since the 1980s, Birkin has expanded several times, but has kept its base of operations near Durban in KwaZulu-Natal. Cars are currently sold through dealers around the world in the United States, Japan, and across Europe. The car can be purchased as either a turn-key car, or as a DIY kit, that can be completed by the owner. Several inline 4 cylinder engines, such as the Ford Zetec and Toyota 4A-GE can be used in the vehicle. Further developments to the car include using an independent rear suspension as opposed to the previously used live axle.

As of July 2013 Birkin has added a wide body version, this car is approximately 4" wider and 3" longer.

== See also ==
- Lotus Cars
- Lotus Seven
- List of British cars
