= Fraser Clubman =

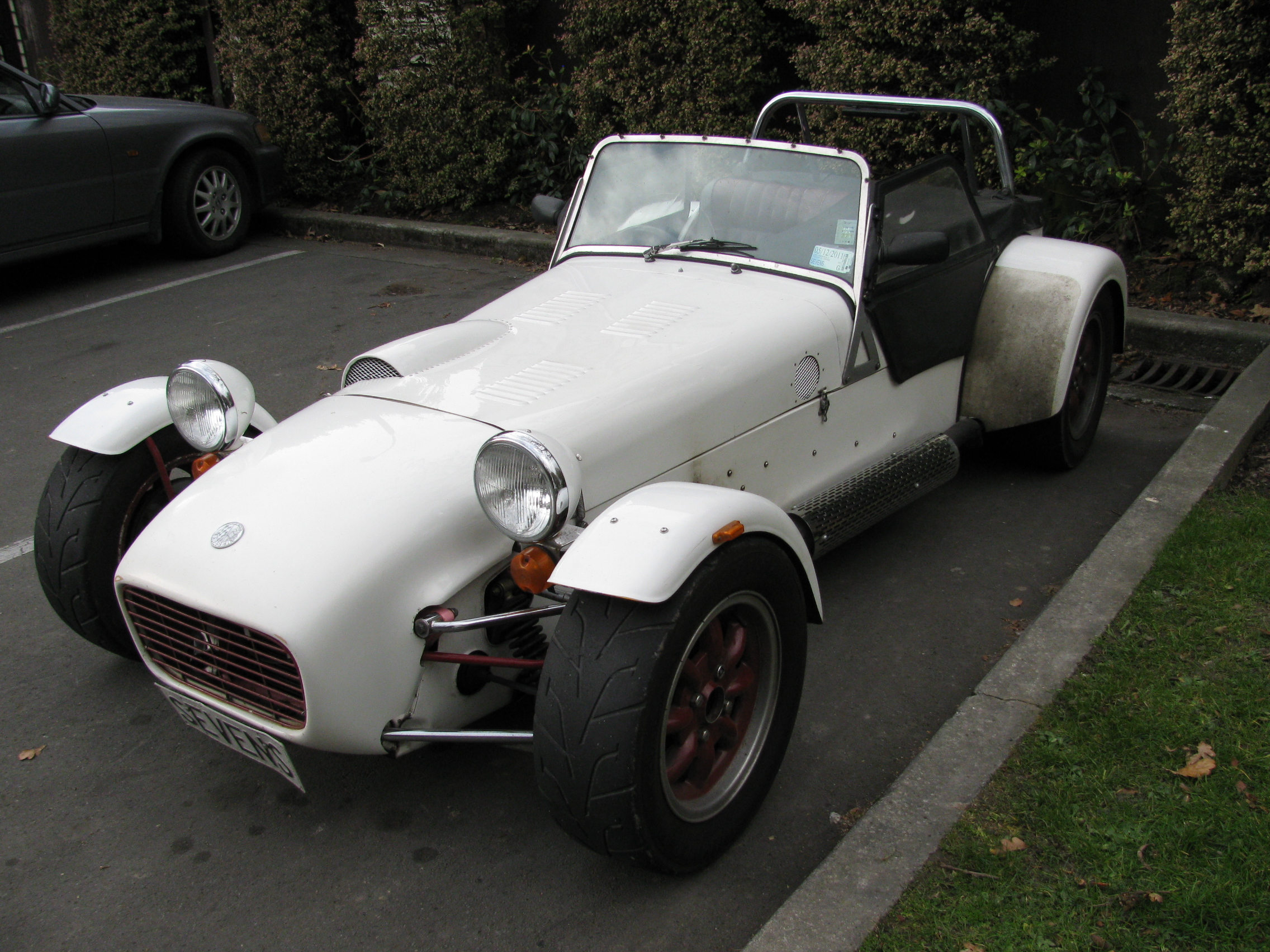

The Fraser Clubman is a component based car similar to a Lotus Seven Series 3, built in Auckland, New Zealand by Fraser Cars Ltd. Scott and Ida Tristram are the current managing directors of Fraser Cars having taken over the company from Neil Fraser in 2006.

Fraser Cars make the hand-crafted Fraser Clubman, a Lotus 7 Series 3 replica. There are five models (the Fraser, Fraser Clubman, Fraser Clubman S, Fraser Clubman SP and the Fraser Clubman SP) that can be purchased as comprehensive self build packages or as a completed car, built to individual specification. The Fraser was Launched at the XPO motor show in 1988. Since then it has sold over 340 units in New Zealand, Japan, the USA and Australia.
