= Locust (car) =

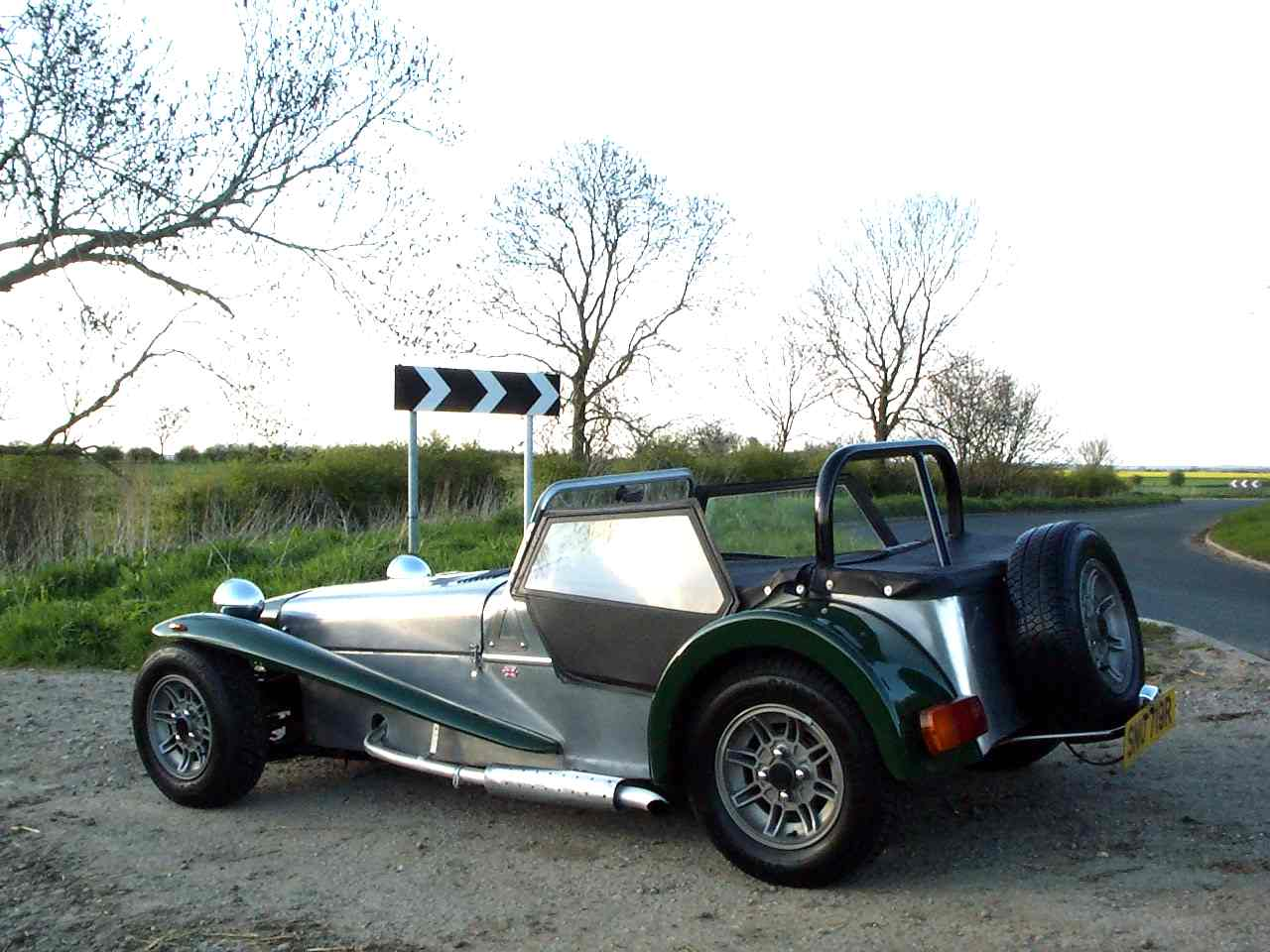
Completed Locust

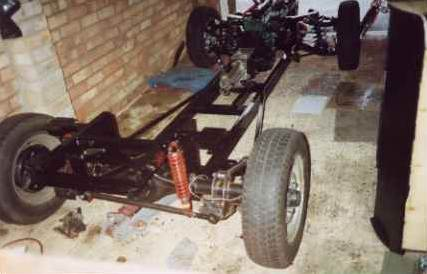
The Locust chassis

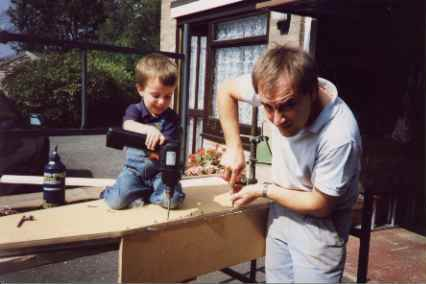
Making the body

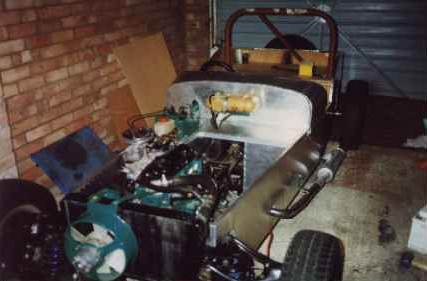
Chassis and body. Missing bonnet(hood) and nosecone

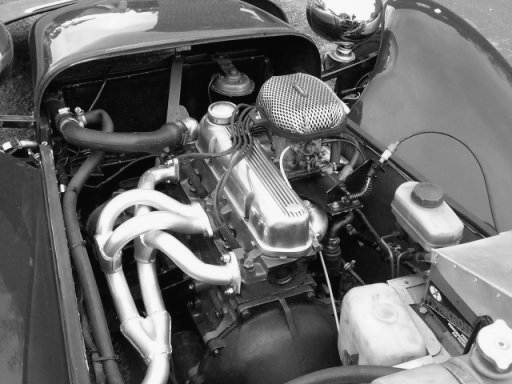
Ford Crossflow Engined Locust

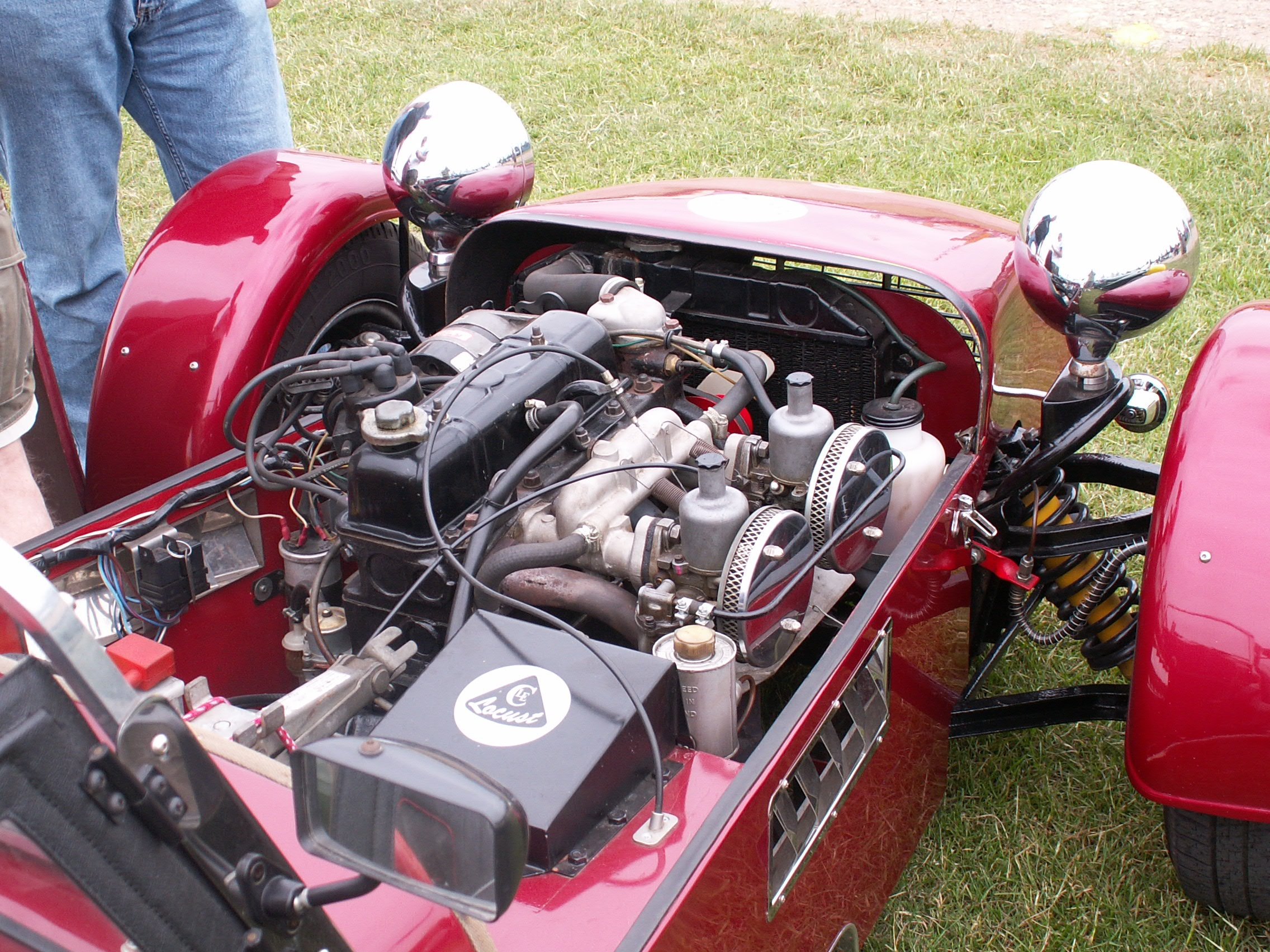
Triumph based Locust

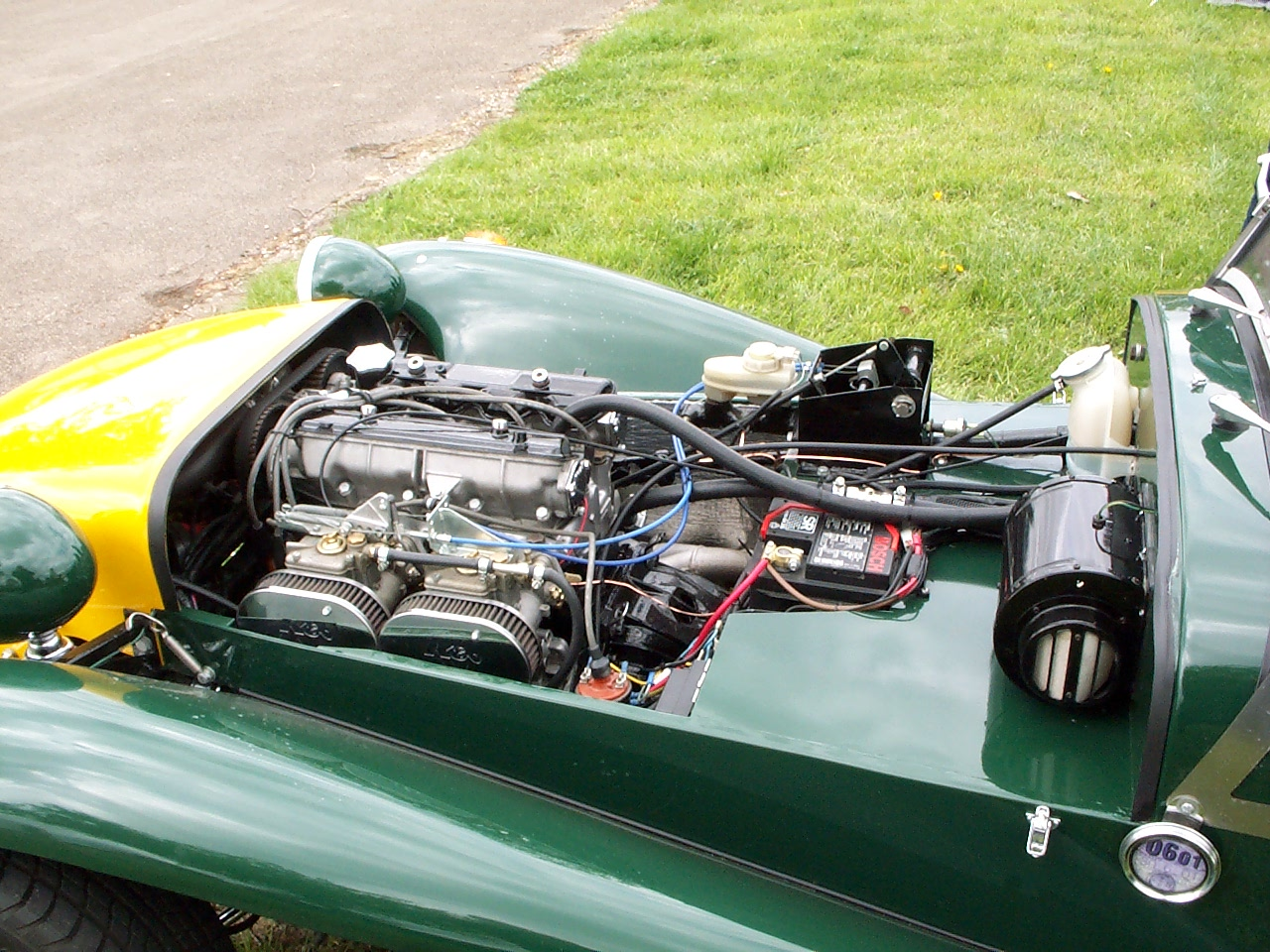
Fiat Twin Cam Engined Locust

Locust is a kit car inspired by the Lotus Seven. It was a budget oriented kit car built using a ladder chassis and a marine ply body. It was created by a famous kitcar 'name' John Cowperthwaite. Shortly after his J. C. MIDGE had been successfully launched and the 'patterns' principle proved popular, it became obvious that perhaps the design of some vehicle other than the traditional style vintage' Roadster could lend itself to this method of construction. The criteria were that the car must have a very simple shape, preferably flat sided with virtually no compound curves on the main body.

The style of the 'LOCUST' appeared straight away to be an obvious choice. The body tub is a small simple tapering 'box' with slab sides. Only the GRP extremities of nosecone and wings carry compound curves, the curved rear and bulkhead panels being simple to wrap with aluminium by curving it through one plane only. The car was famed for its cheap to build construction using marine ply for the body, which was then covered with aluminium sheeting, the kits were produced by various manufacturers until 2014.

== History ==
Unlike the Midge, the Locust kit was developed to use a purpose-built ladder chassis of using a Triumph Spitfire or Mk1/Mk2 Ford Escort with Ford Cortina front suspension for the donor vehicle parts to complete the car. The original design was by John Cowperthwaite (who also designed the Moss kit cars) and it was sold as the JC Locust by J.C. Auto Patterns. The Locust used a ladder frame and a body constructed from three 8 ft by 4 ft sheets of 3/4" thick exterior grade or marine plywood alternatively MDF sheets. Once complete, the body tub is skinned with aluminium sheet.

Later vehicles were sold by T&J Sportscars who also introduced a larger Locust to compete with the Robin Hood kit car, this Ford Cortina-based vehicle was called the Hornet.

In 1995, the Escort-based Locust was taken over by White Rose Vehicles (WRV) who continued to sell the same model until 1998. Seeing that rear-wheel drive Ford Escorts were becoming rare, they developed and introduced the new Ford Sierra-based Locust SIII. The new design used a ladder chassis with the Ford Sierra rear differential and could be built with either Pinto or Zetec engines.

White Rose Vehicles closed in April 2000, so the Escort-based Locust Classic was taken over by BWE Sportscars who also made the Hornet and the Grasshopper electric car for children. The Sierra-based Series III was taken over by Road Tech Engineering; it was renamed the RT Blaze but this company closed in 2006 after having sold only 15 kits. Bev Evans of BWE died on 10 April 2014 and BWE Sportscars is no longer trading.

== Models ==
"The Locust" – Using its own chassis with either Triumph or Ford Escort/Cortina mechanicals

"Hornet" – Same construction as the classic Locust but based all around the Cortina for a bigger vehicle

"Locust S111" – The Locust for the new millennium, using more modern ford mechanicals
