= Almac =

- Industry: Car manufacture
- Founded: 1984 in Upper Hutt, New Zealand
- Founder: Alex McDonald
- Headquarters: Matamata, New Zealand
- Area served: New Zealand
- Key people: Jem Marsh, Phil Derby, George Ulyate
- Products: Almac 427, Almac TC, Almac TG
- Parent: Almac Reinforced Plastics Ltd

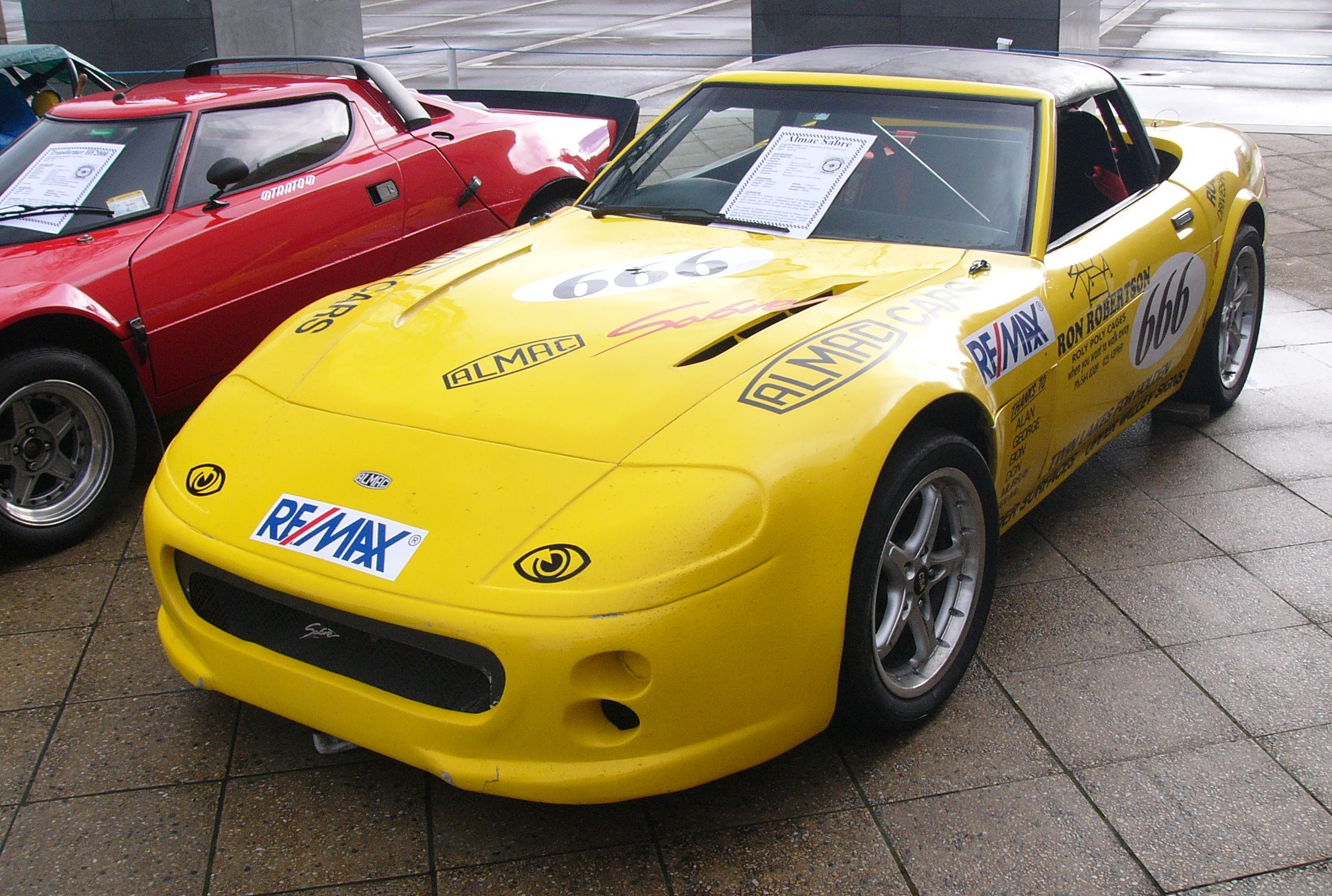
Almac Sabre

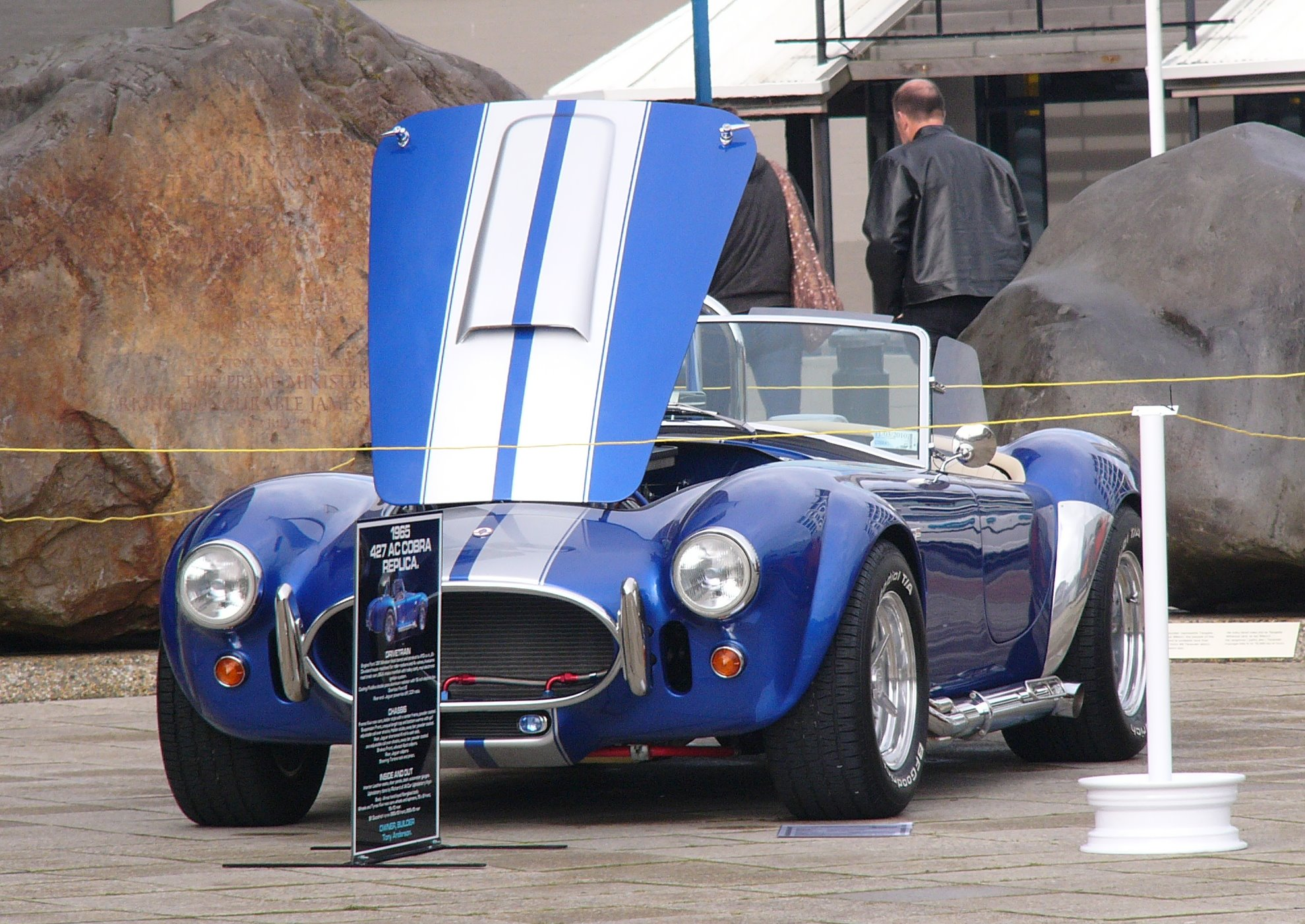
Almac AC Cobra replica

Almac is a New Zealand–based kit car company founded in 1984 and located in Upper Hutt. Almac cars started as a part of Almac Reinforced Plastics Ltd fibreglass product manufacturing a company founded in 1971 by Alex McDonald. McDonald's interest in kit cars started while he was living in England, having purchased a Jem Marsh Sirocco. Jem Marsh founded the Marcos car company. On the 31st of May 2024 the company was purchased by Malcolm Sankey of Matamata Panelworks

== First car ==
McDonald continued his interest in kit cars when he migrated to New Zealand. At that time the most common kit cars in New Zealand were Beach Buggies based on a Volkswagen chassis and a wedge shaped sports car, the Australian Purvis Eureka. In 1976 McDonald set about designing a sports car, similar in shape to the 1974 Lotus Elite and based on a Volkswagen chassis. This car was sold to Phil Derby who uses it as a track car. No further models were made.

== Almac 427 ==
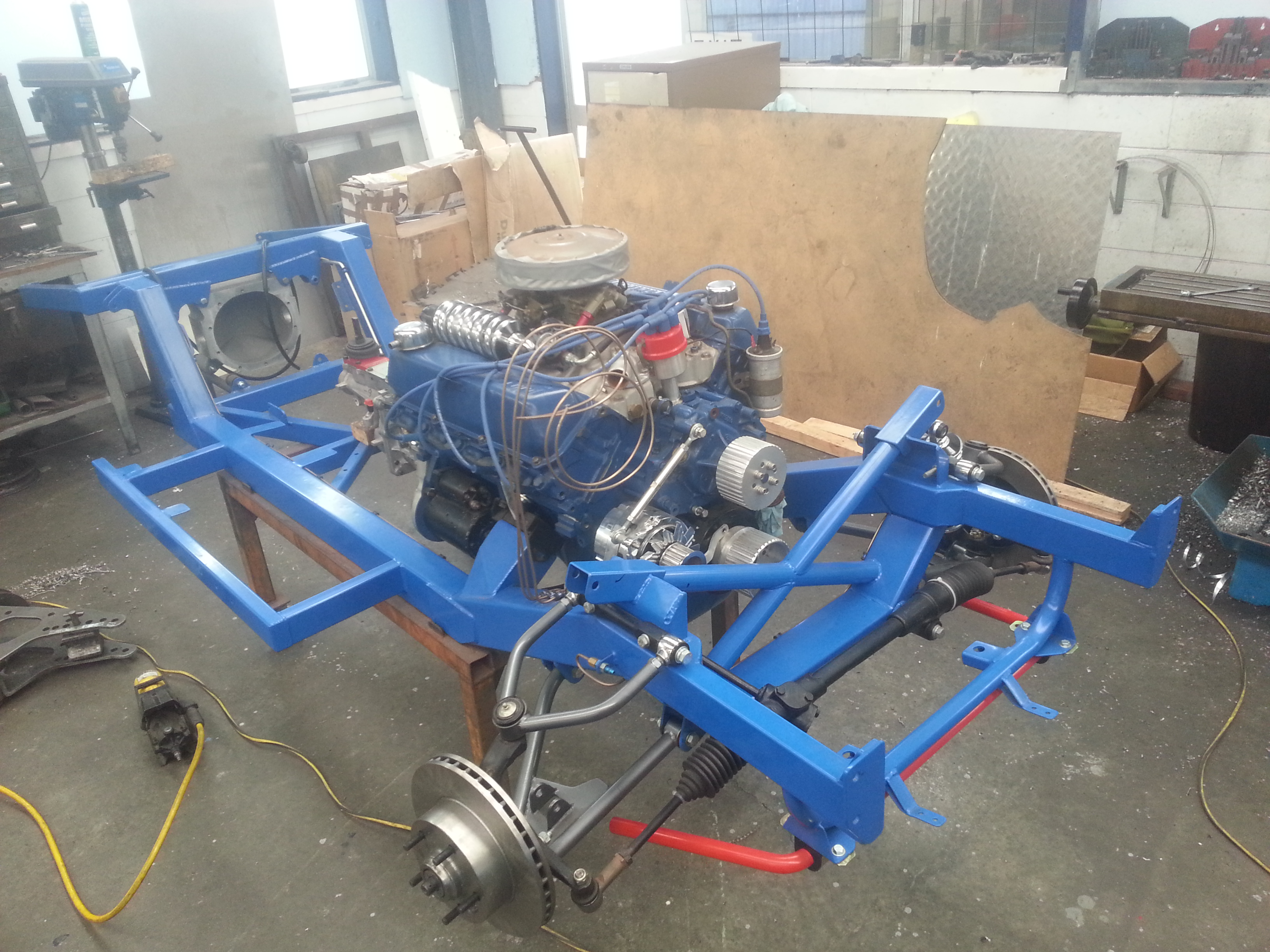
KiwiRaceCars.com 427 Cobra chassis awaiting its Almac body

McDonald's friends suggested he create a replica car instead as Volkswagen based kit cars were reaching their end. With the help of George Ulyate, McDonald created scale drawings and started work on a replica Shelby Cobra 427. McDonald contracted KiwiRaceCars.com (Then Graham Berry Race Cars Limited) to create the chassis and build the Cobra using McDonald's Fiberglass body. The first car was shown at the 1984 National Hot Rod Show. Seventeen cars were sold that year. None were badged as Almac's, and some have been mistaken as genuine Cobra's. More than 450 Cobras have been produced using Almac made fibreglass bodies.

== Almac TC ==
As the Cobra was selling well, in 1986 McDonald decided to add another model more of his own design. The car was loosely based on the MG TC. It was not a replica and designed to fit a Triumph Herald chassis. Twenty-five kits were sold in two years.

McDonald also began to build turnkey models of this car. Construction of these and their kits ended in 1988 because sound Triumph Herald chassis were becoming difficult to obtain and the engine size was limited by the chassis.

The specification for one owned by Mike Boven compared to a TG of Roy Hoares:

	TC – Mike Boven	TG – Roy Hoares
Acquired	1995	2002
Engine	Triumph 2.0 L 6 cylinder Front Mounted	Toyota 2.0 L Front Mounted
Length	3660mm	3660mm
Width	1600mm	1600mm
Height	1240mm	1240mm
Wheelbase	2400mm	2400mm
Track	1360mm	1360mm
Brakes	Drum Front/Rear	Disk front/Drum rear
Seating	2	2
Kerb Weight	590 kg	590 kg

== Almac TG ==
Production and work began on the TG in 1988. Although similar to the TC, the TG had an Almac designed chassis and used Holden Gemini as a donor car. The first kits went on sale in 1989. The TG model did not sell as well as the TC and demand tapered off after about sixteen had been made.

== Almac Sabre and Sabre Series 2 ==
2004 Almac Sabre S2

Overview
- Manufacturer: Almac
- Production: 2004

Body and chassis
- Class: Two-seater sports coupe
- Body style: fibreglass body
- Platform: tubular space-fame chassis

Powertrain
- Engine: 4.0 litre Toyota 1UZFE Lexus, all-alloy,quad-cam V8
- Transmission: Five-speed manual, Toyota Supra

Dimensions
- Wheelbase: 2,300 mm (7 ft 7 in)
- Length: 4,050 mm (13 ft 3 in)
- Width: 1,830 mm (6 ft 0 in)
- Kerb weight: 1,175 kg (2,590 lb)

Chronology
- Predecessor: Almac Sabre

McDonald had still not been able to build a car that was a unique Almac. McDonald and his son Stuart started work designing a modern interpretation of the Cobra. The first design took some of its design cues from the MGB. While the prototype was under construction McDonald became disenchanted with it and consigned to the tip.

In 1991 redesign began using a purpose built chassis and Ford Cortina parts and a Leyland P76 V8 engine. Named the Almac Sabre, it was featured in the NZ Classic Car magazine in May 1994. By this time the market had changed. The Mazda MX-5 was available and, due a legislative change, cheap second hand Japanese cars were being imported. A new MX5 was only a thousand New Zealand dollars more expensive than the Sabre kit. Also the Ford Cortina did not have a good lineage for a sports car. Despite having good publicity through Driver magazine in 1995, Which Kit in 1996, and Classic Car again in 2000 production ceased in 2001 after only nine models had been made.

With a revival of the kit car industry, in 2002 McDonald began development the Almac Sabre Series 2. A newer and stronger chassis was designed, the Cortina windscreen was retained, a Toyota Lexus V8 motor was added, and the body received a significant face lift. The new Sabre was launched at the Hamilton Motor Show in March 2004 and with five being ordered.

== Almac Clubsprint and Clubsprint XL ==
When kit car production slowed down towards the end of the 1990s McDonald began to look for alternatives. Graham Berry had a completed chassis for a Lotus Seven–based car. His intention was to a cheap kit car that could be built for less than $10,000. The kit used Mark 1 or 2 Ford Escort parts and was launched through Classic Car magazine in 2002. The XL was created to meet a demand for a slightly larger chassis.
