= Lotus Seven =

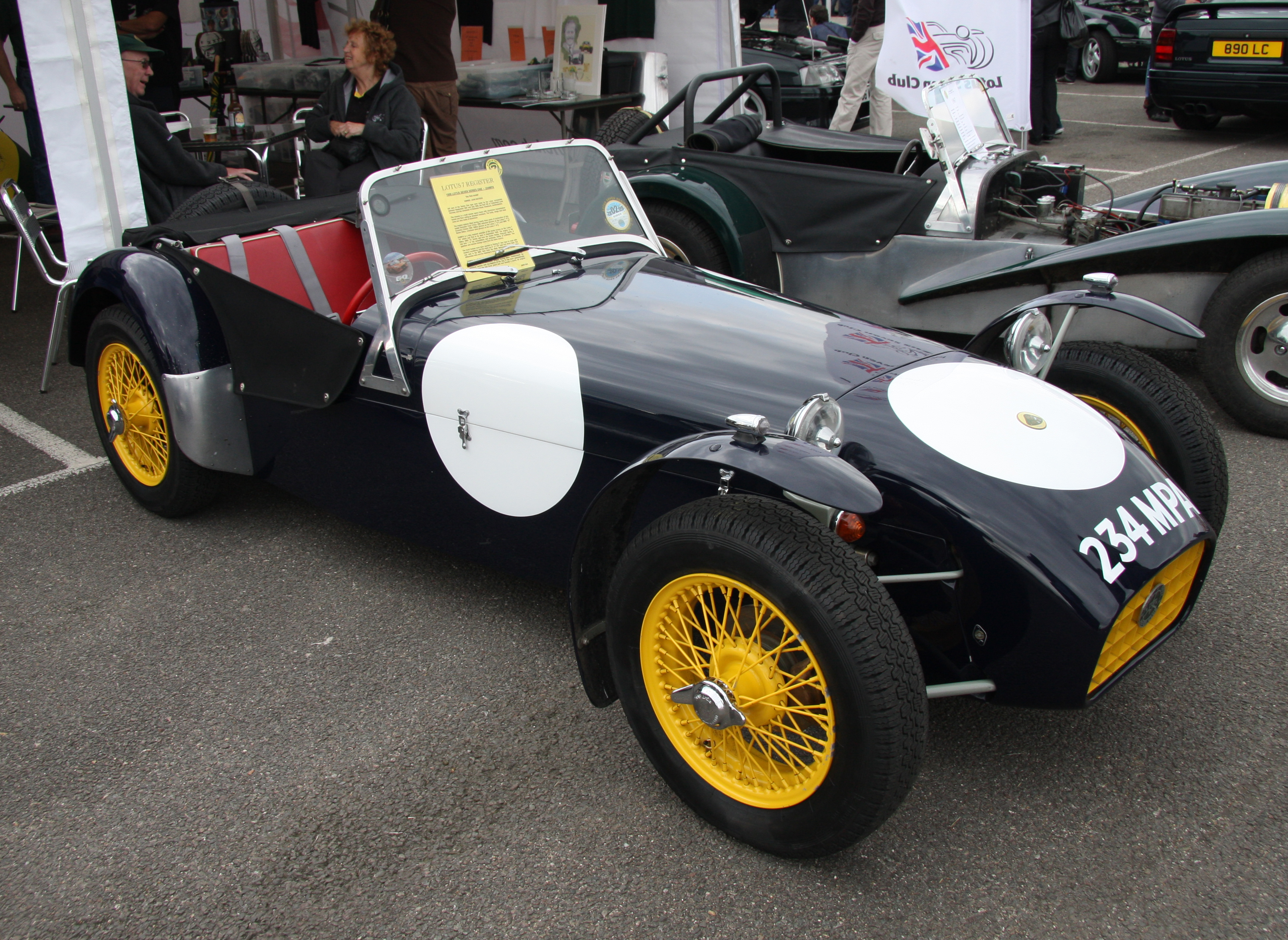
- Lotus 7 Series 1

Overview
- Manufacturer: Lotus Cars
- Also called: Lotus 7 Lotus Super Seven
- Production: 1957–1973
- Assembly: United Kingdom: Hornsey, London; United Kingdom: Cheshunt, Hertfordshire; United Kingdom: Hethel, Norfolk (from 1966); Argentina: Martínez (Lotus Argentina S.A.)
- Designer: Colin Chapman

Body and chassis
- Class: Sports car
- Body style: roadster
- Layout: FMR layout
- Related: Caterham 7 Donkervoort S7/S8

Powertrain
- Transmission: manual

Chronology
- Predecessor: Lotus Mark VI
- Successor: Caterham 7

The Lotus Seven is a sports car produced by the British manufacturer Lotus Cars (initially called Lotus Engineering) between 1957 and 1973. The Seven is an open-wheel car with two seats and an open top. It was designed by Lotus founder Colin Chapman and has been considered the embodiment of the Lotus philosophy of performance through low weight and simplicity. The original model was highly successful with more than 2,500 cars sold, due to its attraction as a road legal car that could be used for clubman racing.

After Lotus ended production of the Seven in 1973, Caterham bought the rights and today Caterham makes both kits and fully assembled cars based on the original design known as the Caterham 7.

The Lotus Seven design has spawned a host of imitations on the kit car market, generally called Sevens or Sevenesque roadsters.

== History ==
=== Series 1 ===
First generation
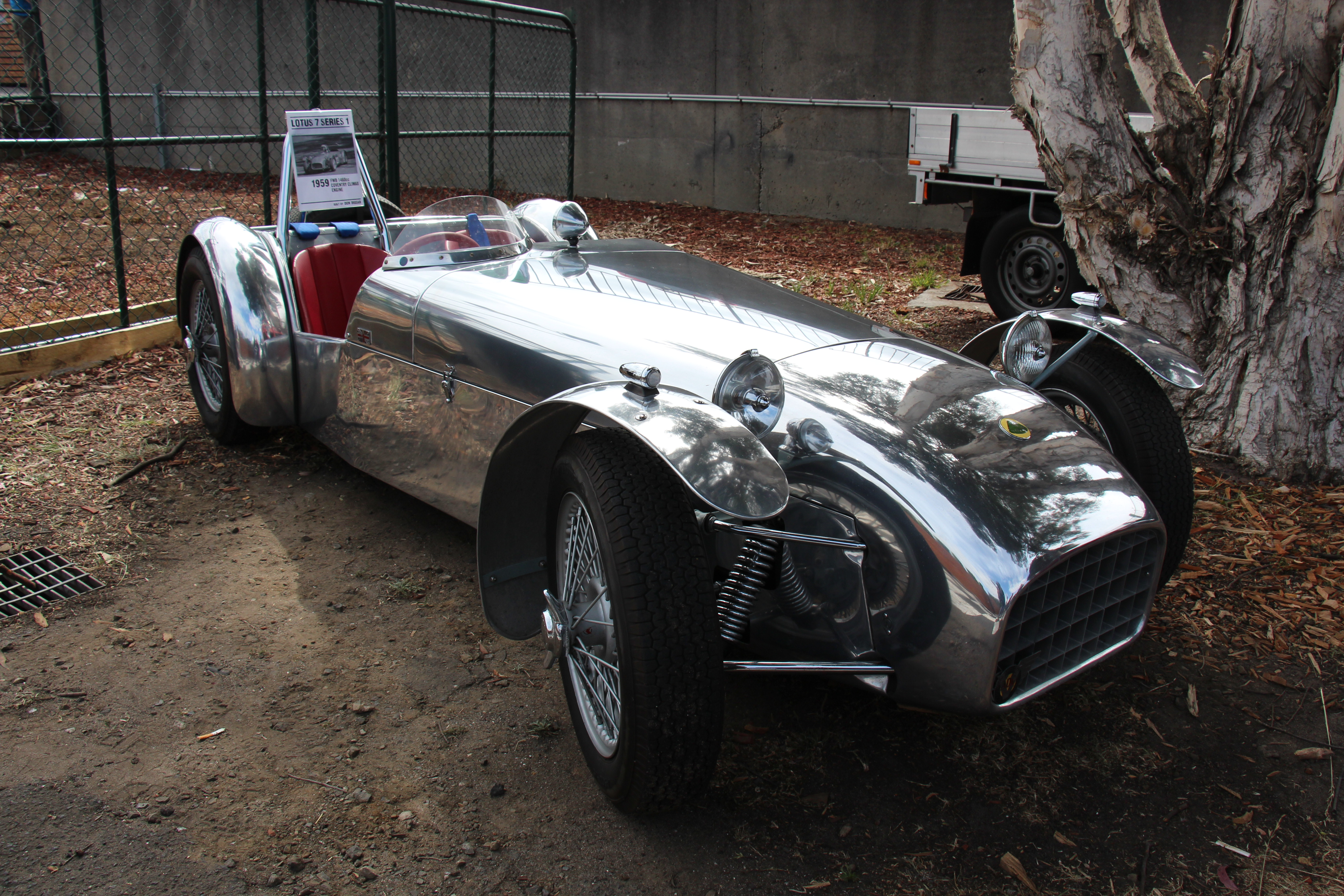
- 1959 Lotus Seven

Overview
- Production: 1957–1960

Body and chassis
- Related: Lotus Eleven

Powertrain
- Engine: 1,172 cc (1.2 L) I4

The Lotus Seven was launched in 1957 to replace the Mark VI as the entry-level Lotus model. The Seven name was left over from a model that Lotus abandoned, which would have been a Riley-engine single-seater that Lotus intended to enter into the Formula Two in 1952 or 1953. However, the car was completed on Chapman's chassis as a sports car by its backers and christened the Clairmonte Special.

Externally similar to Chapman's earlier Lotus Mark VI, but with a different tubular frame similar to the Lotus Eleven, the Seven was powered by a 36 bhp (27 kW; 36 PS) Ford Sidevalve 1,172 cc straight-four engine. In addition to the Ford unit, both BMC series A and Coventry Climax FWA engines were available for fitment. Under the Purchase Tax system of the time cars supplied as a kit did not attract the tax surcharge that would apply if sold in assembled form. Tax rules specified assembly instructions could not be included. This situation remained until 1973 and a large proportion of Sevens sold in the United Kingdom were delivered in kit form as a result.

The Seven Series 1 was used both on the road and for club racing (750 motor club in the UK).

=== Series 2 ===
Second generation
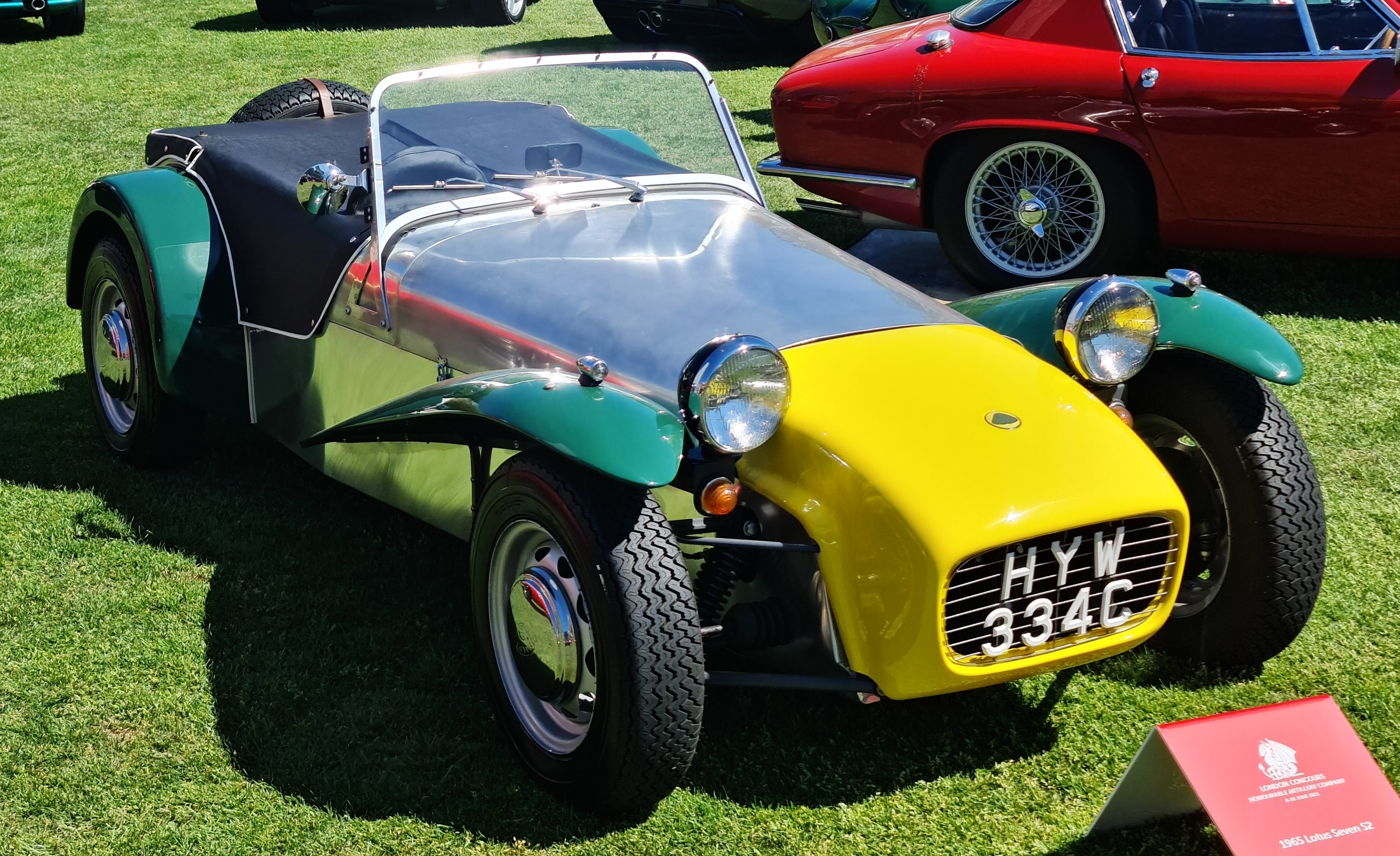
- 1965 Lotus Seven

Overview
- Production: 1960–1968

Powertrain
- Engine: 1,340 cc (1.3 L) I4

The Lotus Seven S2 followed in June 1960 and was supplemented by the Lotus Super Seven S2 from 1961. These were slightly more road-oriented than the Series 1, and received a somewhat simpler chassis. The Series 1's aluminium nosecone was changed to a fibreglass unit. Cycle fenders were originally standard, with clamshell units standard fitment on the 1500, Super Seven, and America or available as an option.

While the 1,172 cc Sidevalve unit remained available until 1962, the series 2 typically used Ford Kent engines of 1,340 or 1,499 cc from the Ford Consul Classic. These were also available with Cosworth modifications; the Cosworth 1,340 cc "Super Seven" delivered 85 bhp (63 kW; 86 PS) and the later "Super Seven 1500" 105 bhp (78 kW; 106 PS). Some Series 2 Sevens built during 1968 (oftentimes referred to as "Series 2 1/2") were fitted with the later crossflow Kent engine of 1,599 cc.

The series II had problems with its Standard Companion estate car rear axle and differential, unable to cope with the high power and cornering forces of the Seven. This was later solved on the Series III by installing a Ford Cortina rear end. Production of the Series 2 ended in August 1968, after 1,310 examples had been built.

=== Series 3 ===
Third generation
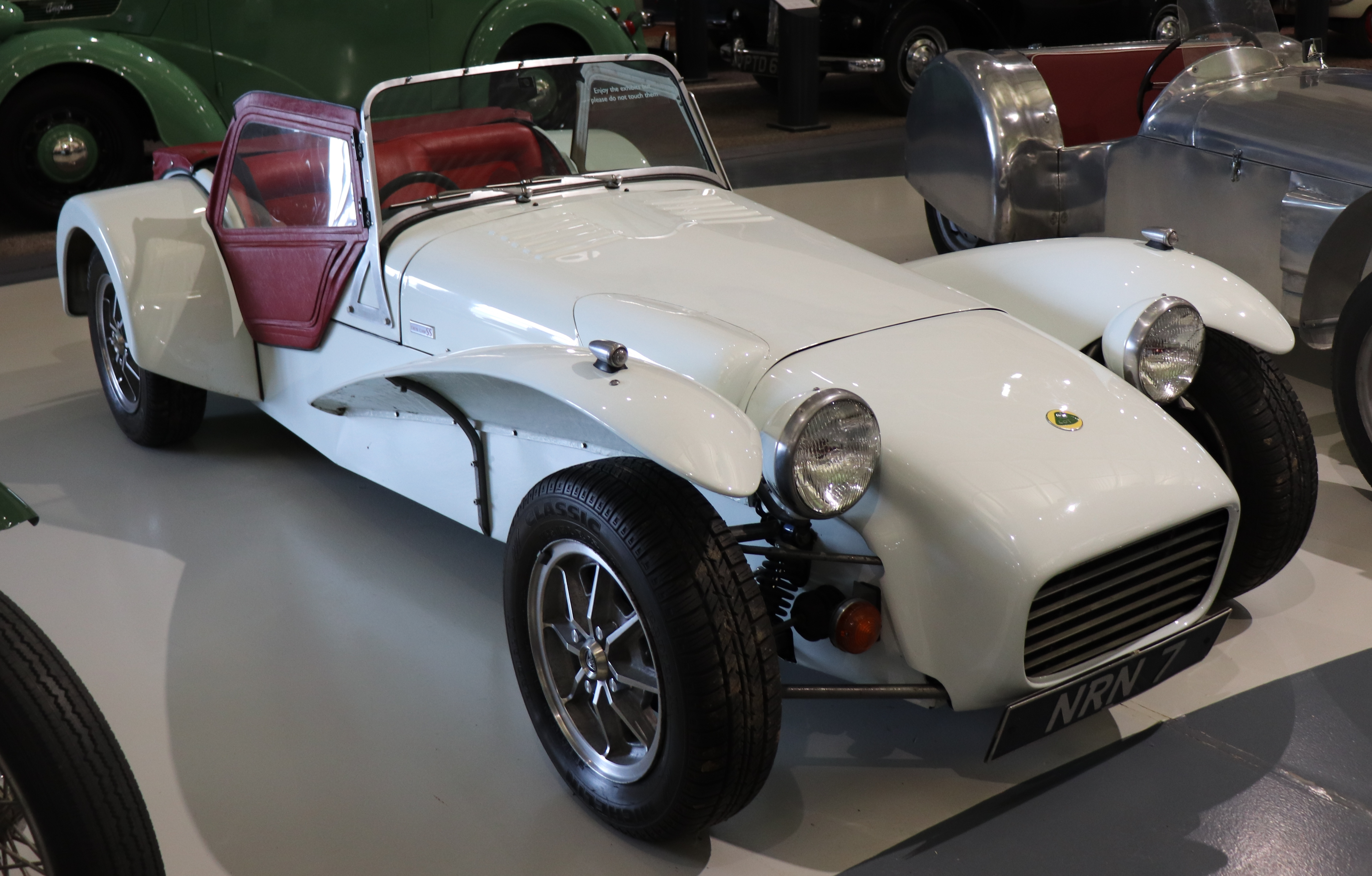
- 1969 Lotus Super Seven Twin Cam SS

Overview
- Production: 1968–1970

Powertrain
- Engine: 1,600 cc (1.6 L) I4

The Seven S3 was released in 1968. As for late Series 2s, the S3 typically received the 1,599 cc crossflow Kent engine. First shown at Earl's Court in 1969, the Super Seven Twin Cam SS used the Lotus Twin Cam engine. Only 13 examples were built. While only manufactured by Lotus for around two years, the Series 3 was the model later revived by Caterham after they ran out of Series 4 kits some time in the first half of the 1970s. In modified form, the design continues to be produced until today (2023).

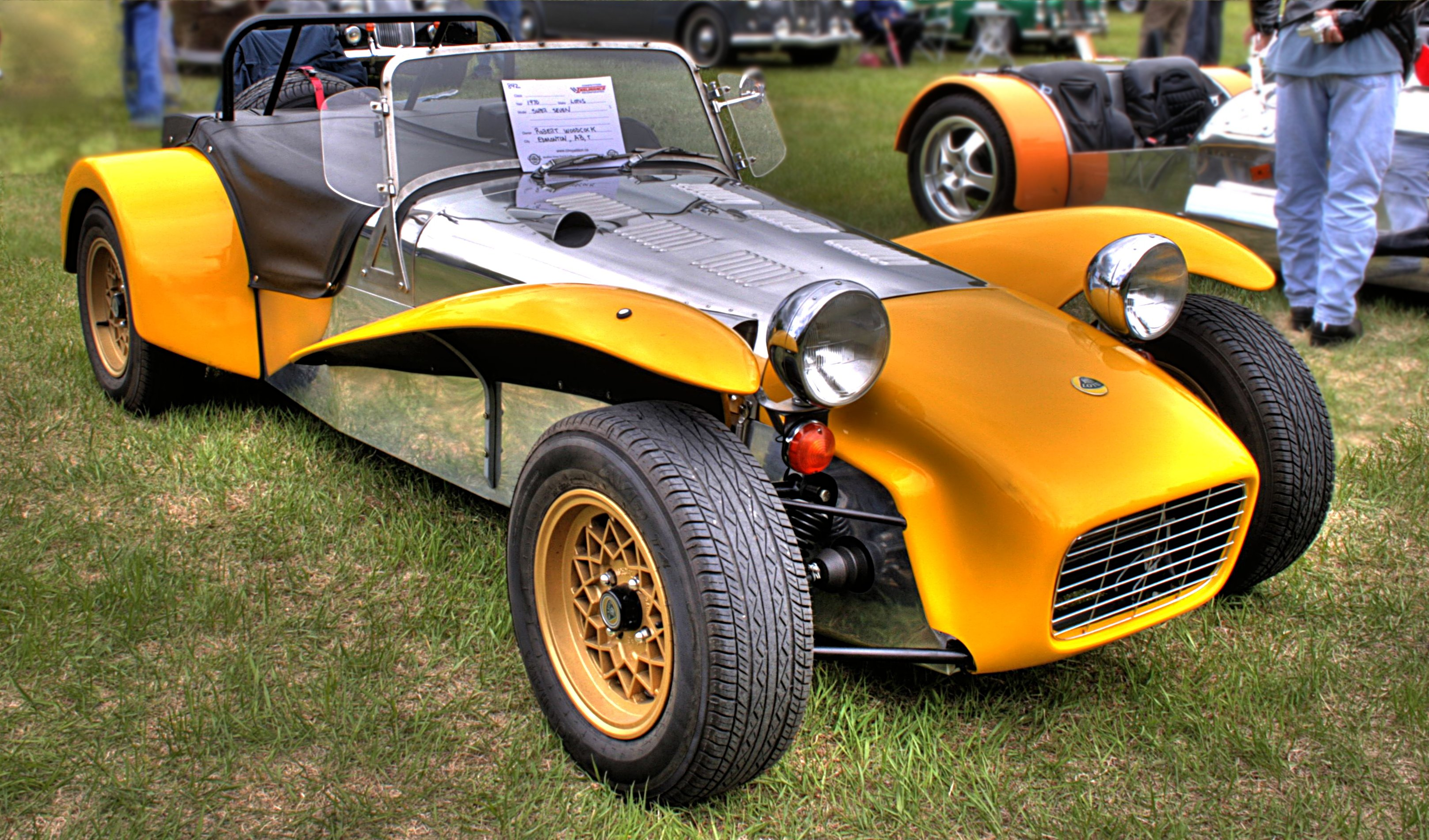
1970 Lotus Super 7

Between 1970 and 1975, following a representation agreement, Lotus Argentina SA obtained the licence to manufacture the Lotus Seven in Argentina. This production reached approximately 51 units. These vehicles were not replicas but built under licence and branded as Lotuses.

=== Series 4 ===
Fourth generation
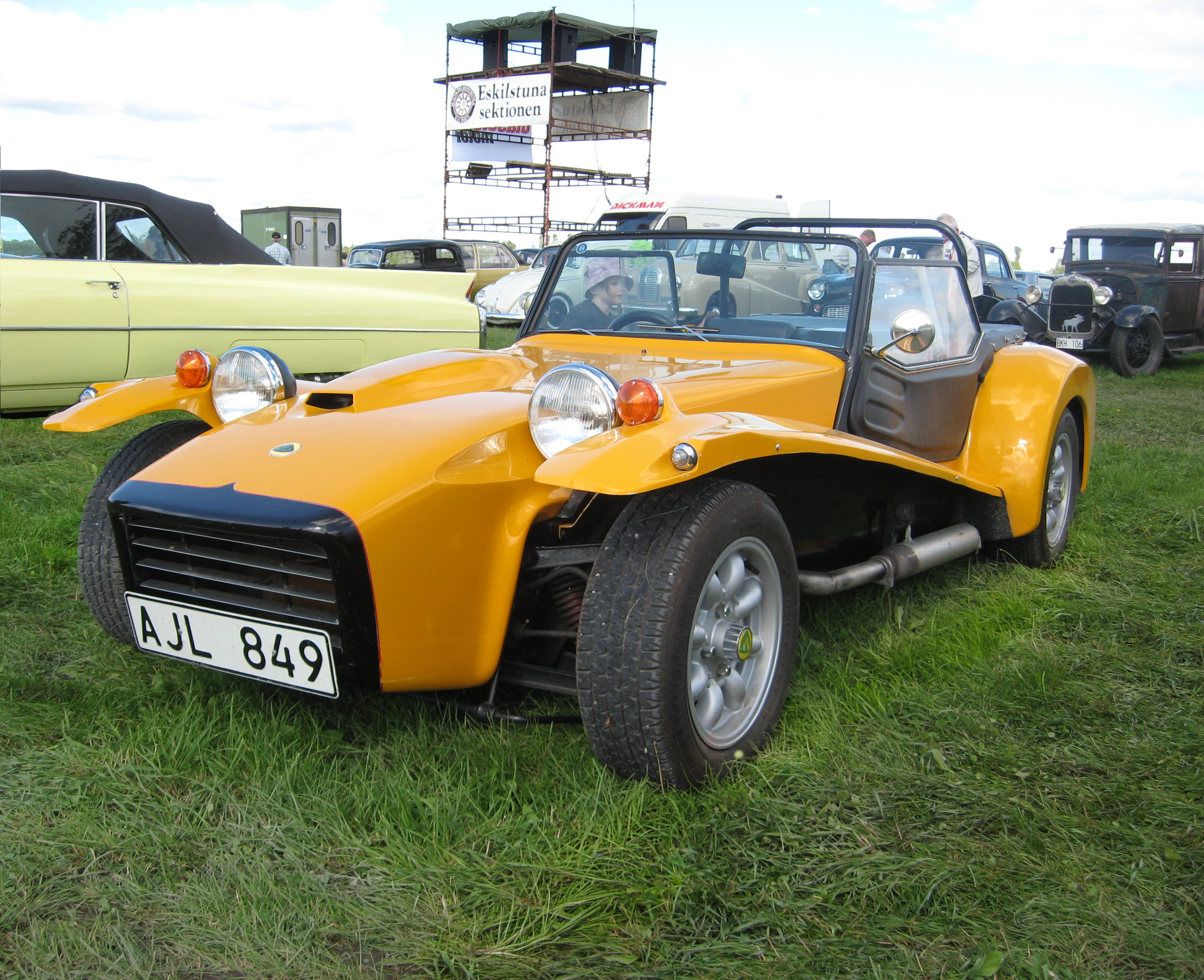

Overview
- Production: 1970–August 1973

Powertrain
- Engine: 1298 cc Ford Kent OHV I4; 1558 cc Lotus Twin Cam DOHC I4; 1599 cc Ford Kent OHV I4

In 1970, Lotus radically changed the shape of the car to create the slightly more conventional sized Series 4 (S4), with a squarer fibreglass shell replacing most of the aluminium bodywork. It also offered some luxuries as standard, such as an internal heater matrix. The S4 Seven could be supplied with 1298 or 1599 cc Kent engines or the twin cam.

Until now, most Sevens in the UK had been sold in kit form in order to avoid paying purchase tax. However, once the UK joined the EEC on 1 January 1973, the VAT system was adopted instead so the tax advantage of the kit-built Lotus Seven came to an end. Accordingly, in 1973, Lotus decided to shed fully its "British tax system"-inspired kit car image. As part of this plan, it sold the rights to the Seven to its only remaining agents Caterham Cars in England and Steel Brothers Limited in New Zealand.

Caterham ran out of the Lotus Series 4 kits in the early 1970s. When this occurred and in accordance with their agreement with Lotus, Caterham introduced its own brand version of the Series 3. They have been manufacturing the car ever since as the Caterham Seven. Steel Brothers Limited in Christchurch, New Zealand, assembled Lotus Seven Series 4s until March 1979 when the last of the 95 kits provided by Lotus was used up. Steel Brothers had a much wider range of factory options than the UK models with carpet, centre console glove-box, radio, window-washer and hardtop. Sold largely to competition enthusiasts, the NZ cars also had engine modifications, close-ratio gears, and adjustable suspension as factory options. As such, they were very successful in local racing. With officially licensed production stopping in 1979, the last Lotus badged Seven, a Series 4, was therefore produced in New Zealand.

Steel Brothers Limited attempted to make a wider, modernised version of the Series 4, the Lotus Super 907, using the twin cam Lotus 907 engine. In the spring of 1978 it was announced that this was to be sold in the United States - but the American importer had no funds and the project came to naught. The single finished Super 907 was moved from New Zealand to the United States in 2010 to undergo a full restoration.

== Performance ==
=== Road test ===
A car with a tuned Ford 1172 cc engine and close-ratio gearbox was tested by the British magazine The Motor in 1958. It was found to have a top speed of 80.4 mph (129.4 km/h), could accelerate from 0-60 mph (97 km/h) in 6.2 seconds and had a fuel consumption of 31.0 miles per imperial gallon (9.1 L/100 km; 25.8 mpg_{‑US}). The test car cost £1,157 including taxes of £386. They commented that that car could be bought in component form and then it would have cost £399 for the parts from Lotus, £100 for the Ford engine and gearbox and £27 for the BMC rear axle.

=== Top speed ===
A Seven's top speed greatly depends upon the body configuration, engine power and gearing. Early models with low-powered engines had difficulty exceeding 90 mph (140 km/h), although a race-prepared Seven was clocked at 127 mph (204 km/h) whilst driven by Brausch Niemann through a speed-trap at the 1962 Natal Grand Prix. In addition, clamshell style wings tend to create drag and generate lift at higher speeds. Cycle wings help alleviate this tendency, and low height Brookland aeroscreens or the lighter Perspex variants that can replace the windscreen help improve top end speed. Sevens do suffer from front end lift at high speed – the nose creates more lift than downforce at speeds over around 70 mph (110 km/h), although retro fitted "winglets" may counter this.

=== Low speed acceleration ===
Nearly all Sevens, due to their extremely light weight (around 10cwt / 500 kg) have excellent acceleration, especially up to 70 mph (110 km/h), depending on power. The original late 1950s Sevens could beat most contemporary saloon cars—and by the early 1960s, with improved Ford-Cosworth engines could take on most high-performance sports cars with 0–60 mph time in the low 7 seconds.

=== Braking ===
The less powerful early models had drum brakes all around, in common with most road cars of the time. Later models had front disc brakes. Physics favours small cars in braking and Sevens have excellent stopping distances.

=== Handling ===
The highest part of the car is about three feet (900 mm) from the road and it has a cloth top and side curtains with plastic back and side windows. The supports for the top and the windshield frame are aluminium. The lower chassis tubes are five inches (127 mm) from the road, while the wet-sump, bell housing, and one chassis tube are lower, meaning the centre of gravity is very low.

The front/rear weight distribution is nearly equal and the lack of a boot and small petrol tank assure that it remains fairly constant. It is, however, more front-heavy than more modern high-performance cars.

==== Suspension ====
In the original Seven, the front lower A-arm (or "wishbone") of the double wishbone suspension is traditional, but for the purpose of reducing weight, the upper suspension integrated an anti-roll (anti-sway) bar into a horizontal suspension arm. This approach formed a pseudo-wishbone which was semi-independent in nature. This approach worked well with early cross-ply tyres, but with later radials, the configuration seriously affected its adjustability.

For the rear suspension, Lotus originally used a live axle (or solid axle). This approach was very cost-effective since most production saloon cars up to the 1980s used these components. A mixture of Ford, Standard Motor Company and Austin components was used. One disadvantage of live axles is higher unsprung weight, affecting handling and ride on rough surfaces.

==== Aerodynamics ====
In general, cars with non-optimised aerodynamics tend to be free of adverse aerodynamic effects on handling, but the front wheel arches, of all but the Series I, cause lift at high speeds. Like the good straight-line performance, the car's nimble handling is limited in the speed range, and this is not usually important in a car intended for public roads.

While the car's frontal area is small, the Lotus Seven has a drag coefficient ($\scriptstyle C_\mathrm d\,$) among the highest of any known production car - ranging from 0.65 to 0.75, depending on the bodywork.

Additionally, the clamshell front wings develop lift. This is accentuated by the slight natural lift caused by rotating wheels. Consequently, Sevens have exhibited understeer at high speeds.

==== Steering ====
The rack and pinion steering provide a minimum of play and friction.

=== Frame rigidity ===
It is a stressed skin construction, in which the flat aluminium body panels, and especially the floor, stiffen and effectively triangulate the largely rectangular steel tubular frame structure. This gives a rigid frame with few tubes and very little bodyweight that does not contribute to the frame stiffness. The flat panels avoid difficulties in shaping aluminum sheet into smooth compound curves. On the downside, it does not allow attractive curves or streamlining.

== Mechanical details ==
=== Engines ===
Originally equipped with the Ford Sidevalve engine, the Series 2 received the new Ford Kent engine. The original "Super Seven" received versions of the Kent unit with Cosworth modifications. Later, the Kent engine was updated to the crossflow design; this 1.6-litre engine was the most commonly installed one in the Series 3 as well as Series 4. A limited number of earlier cars received Coventry Climax FWA engines, while the later cars were offered with the Lotus-Ford Twin Cam engine.

=== Frame and body ===
The Lotus Seven was designed with racing in mind, and lightness was of primary concern to Chapman. Like racing cars of the time, it was therefore built around a multi-tube space frame with high sides to allow a stiffer frame (longer lever arm). The Series II and later road versions had simpler frames than the more race-oriented Series I.

A front-mounted engine driving the rear wheels (a similar layout to most cars of the day) and a very lightweight steel spaceframe was covered with stressed aluminium panel bodywork. The body panels were mainly flat to avoid the expense of more elaborate curved bodywork, and the simple cloth lined plastic doors were hinged from the windscreen. The nose-cone and wheel arches were originally aluminium parts, but these were replaced in the later S2 and S3 models with painted or self-coloured fibreglass.

=== Weight ===
Early Lotus Sevens weighed around 1,100 lb (10cwt/500 kg). Although the weight crept upward as production progressed, it remained remarkably low for a production car of over a litre displacement.

=== Suspension ===
The front was by "A" arms and coil springs with an anti-roll bar serving as the front half of the top A-arm. The rear had trailing arms, a triangular centre locating member, and a solid rear axle.

== In popular culture ==
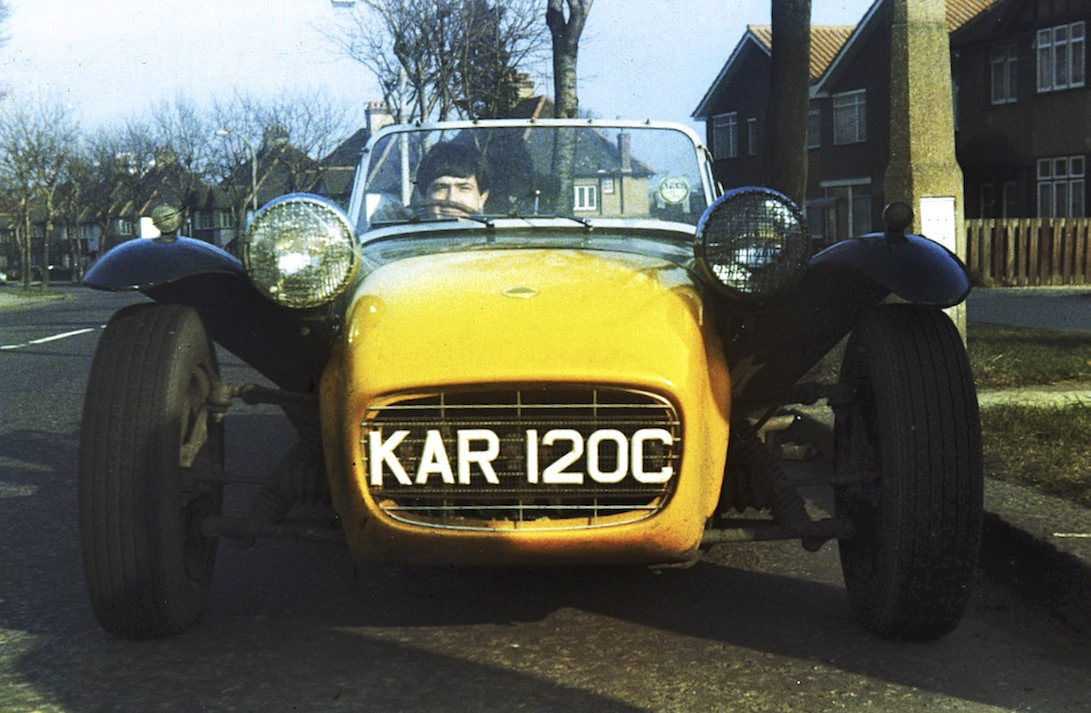
Lotus Seven S2 used in The Prisoner

- An S2 Lotus Seven (registration plate "KAR 120C"), driven by creator/director and actor Patrick McGoohan, was featured in the opening titles of the 1967–1968 television series The Prisoner—although the car in the final episode, "Fall Out", was another, driven by Caterham Car's MD Graham Nearn.
- Marvel Comics superhero Wolverine drives a Lotus Seven.
- A Lotus Seven appears as one of the stealable cars in Grand Theft Auto: London 1969, under the name "Locust". There is a replica of the Lotus Seven made under the same name and another version made under the trade name of the Locost.
- In the Sonic the Hedgehog series of video games, the Lotus Seven is said to be the favorite car of Tails. Tails' vehicles in Sonic Drift, Sonic Drift 2, Sonic & All-Stars Racing Transformed, Team Sonic Racing and Sonic Racing: CrossWorlds are based on the Lotus Seven. Tails also appears with an actual Lotus Seven in a hidden screen accessed using the sound test in Sonic CD.
- In the game Rage Racer the Age Pegase (top-notch handling) is a reference to the Lotus S7.
- A Super Seven is driven by the character Sena Wakabayashi in the anime series You're Under Arrest.
- Sōichi Sugano from the anime éX-Driver drives a Super Seven. This series contains several Lotus models, but the Seven is most prominent.
- Jim Skylark from the anime Gate Keepers drives a Super Seven with license plate AEGIS 02. In the series he debuted in the car, outrunning Shun Ukiya's Toyota Sports 800 (license plate: AEGIS 01) on the freeway.
- One is featured on the cover of Chris Rea's 1991 album, Auberge. It also appears in the video for the song "Auberge". The car was owned by the guitarist at the time.

== Literature ==
The Lotus Seven has spawned many books, test reports, and articles, many of which are still in print.

- Lotus Seven 1957-1980. Edited by R.M. Clarke, Brooklands Books, 1980, ISBN 0-907073-13-1. (Test reports and articles from magazines around the world.)
- Lotus Seven Collection No. 1, 1957-1982. Edited by R.M. Clarke, Brooklands Books, 1982, ISBN 0-907073-50-6. (Test reports and articles from magazines around the world.)
- Lotus & Caterham Sevens Gold Portfolio, 1957-1989 Edited by R.M. Clarke, Brooklands Books, 1989, ISBN 1-85520-000-7. (Test reports and articles from magazines around the world.)
- Lotus Seven Gold Portfolio 1957-1973. R.M. Clarke, Brooklands Books, 1996 ISBN 978-1-85520-329-7. (Test reports and articles from magazines around the world.)
- Lotus Caterham Seven Gold Portfolio, 1974-95. Edited by R.M. Clarke, Brooklands Books, 1996, ISBN 978-1-85520-330-3. (Test reports and articles from magazines around the world.)
- The Legend of the Lotus Seven. Dennis Ortenberger, Osprey, 1981, ISBN 0-85045-411-5 (Reissued in 1999 by Mercian manuals.)
- Lotus Seven Super Profile. Graham Arnold, Foulis Motoring Book, Haynes Publishing Group, 1984, ISBN 0-85429-385-X
- The Lotus and Caterham Sevens, A Collector's Guide. Jeremy Coulter, Motor Racing Publications Ltd., 1986, ISBN 0-947981-06-3
- Lotus Seven: Collector's Guide. Jeremy Coulter, Motorbooks International, 1994, ISBN 978-0-947981-71-6
- Lotus Seven: Restoration, Preparation, Maintenance. Tony Weale, Osprey Automotive, 1991, ISBN 1-85532-153-X
- Side Glances, Volumes 1, 2, 3 and 4. Peter Egan, Brooklands Books and Road & Track, ISBN 1-85520-567-X. (Peter Egan's books are collections of his Road & Track column Side Glances many of which feature his Lotus Sevens.)
- Lotus and Caterham Seven: Racers for the Road. John Tipler, Crowood Press, 2005, ISBN 978-1-86126-754-2
- The Magnificent 7: The enthusiasts' guide to all models of Lotus and Caterham Seven. Chris Rees, Haynes Publishing, Second edition 2007, ISBN 978-1844254101
- Why build a Seven? Putting a Sportscar on the Road, a personal record. Michael Eddenden, 2010, Published by lulu.com, ISBN 978-0-557-54398-4 (The building of a Caterham Seven from a Club perspective, it includes much on the owners of Lotus Sevens.)
- Your Kit Car Assembly Manual. Gary Brizendine, 2004, published by GNB Motorsports LLC, ISBN 0-9760560-0-3 (How to assemble and improve any Lotus Seven or Locost sports car kit.)

== Replicas ==
Because of the Seven's relatively simple design, over 160 companies have offered replicas or Seven-type cars over the years. Many have been challenged over the years by the UK rights-holder, Caterham. Such cars are often referred to as "sevenesque" or simply a "seven" or "se7en". Sometimes they are also called clubmans or "locost". Some examples are:

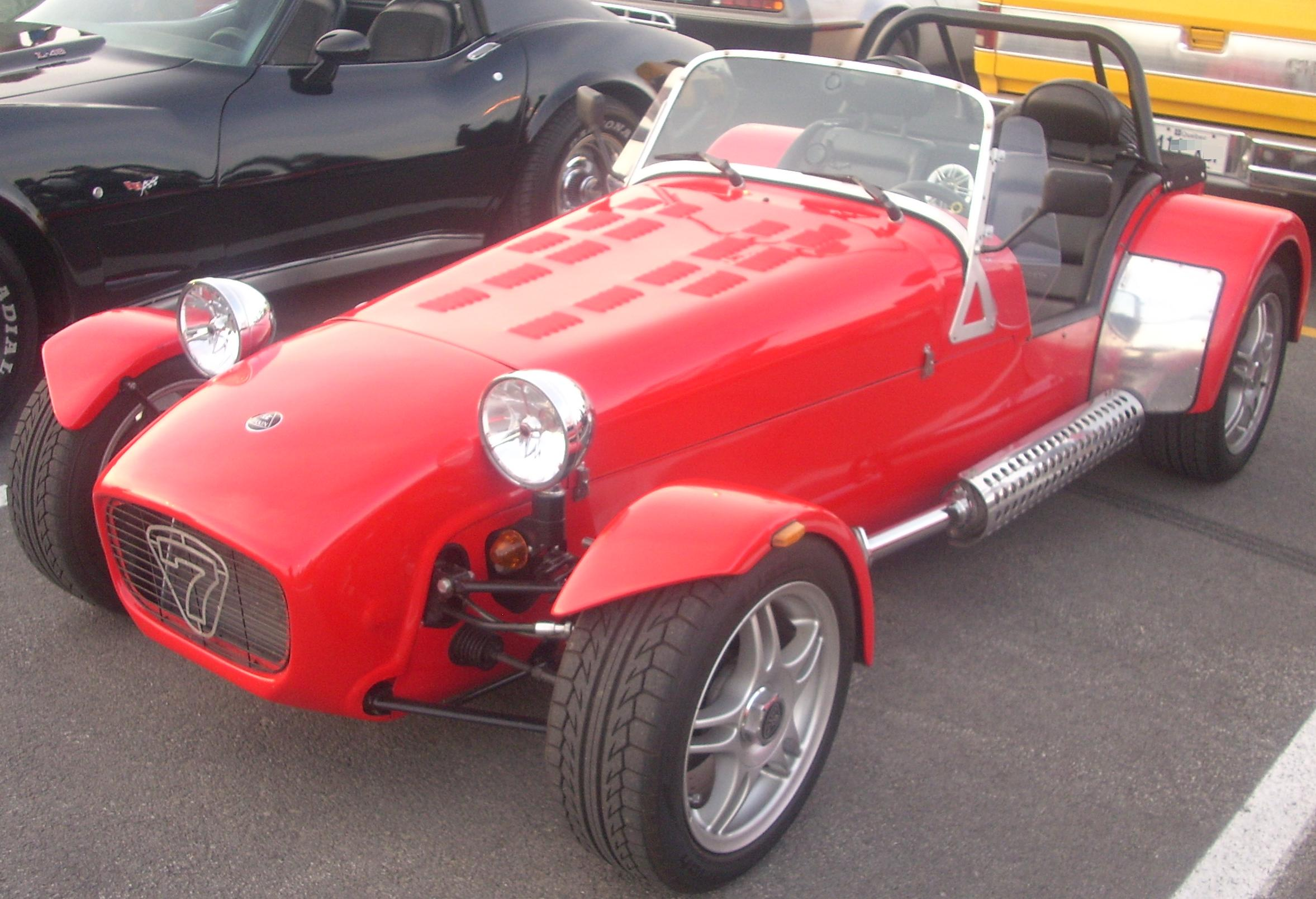
Birkin (North America)

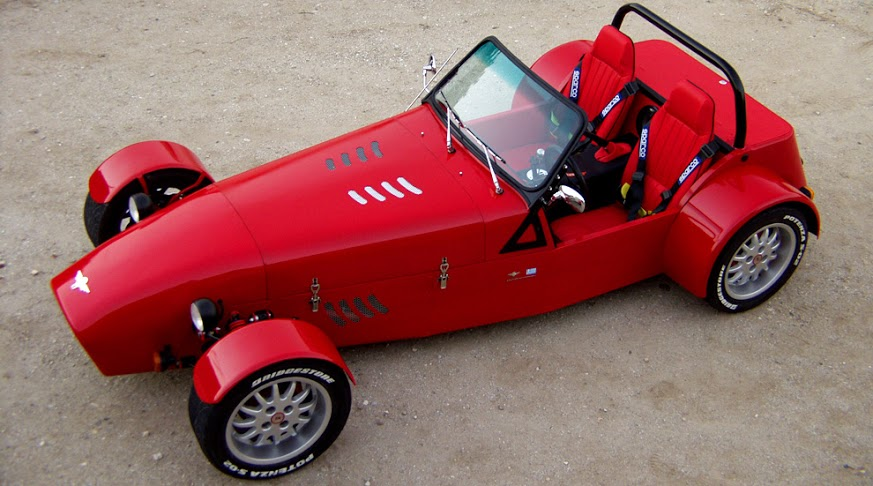
TSV sports car seven

- 527 ShortCut from Russia with Lada engine & parts.
- Almac Clubsprint, by Almac, a kit car manufacturer in New Zealand
- Aries Motorsport Locoblade and Locost in the UK
- Birkin Cars S3, Lotus Seven replica
- BWE Locust, Hornet, Grasshopper
- Caterham owns the rights to reproduce the Lotus Super Seven
- Chinkara Roadster 1.8S
- Cobra Cars produces the Garbí in Spain with the Yamaha R-1 180 hp engine.
- DAX Rush by Dax Cars
- Deman Motorsport
- Donkervoort, a Dutch manufacturer that started with Super Seven kits. Originally derived from the S3, the S7 and S8 were Ford powered. Donkervoort now builds the D8 using Audi powertrains.
- Elfin Sports Cars, Australian manufacturer of the Elfin Type 3 Clubman and Elfin T5 Clubman.
- ESTfield from RaceTech (using Lada parts)
- Esther
- Fraser Clubman from Fraser Cars Ltd New Zealand
- Great British Sports Cars from UK
- Hauser from Switzerland with BMW engines
- Hispano Aleman from Madrid Spain made the Hispano Alemán Mallorca inspired in the Seven with SEAT engine and parts
- Höckmayr KFZ-Technik (HKT) from Germany also with Audi-Turbo-Engines
- Irmscher 7 from Germany with Opel engines
- Kaipan type 47 and 57. Replica from Czech Republic
- Leitch Super Sprint, Leitch Industries, Invercargill, New Zealand
- Lucalia Clubman, Lucalia Partnerships, Tasmania, Australia; mostly Japanese mechanicals (inline 4)
- Luego Sports Cars Velocity and V8 Viento in UK
- Lynx made in New Zealand between 1985 and 1988
- MAC #1
- Marc Nordon Racing Vortx RT, RT+ and RT Super
- McGregor Motorsport Limited New Zealand Lotus Seven replica kits and manufacturers
- Mitsuoka Zero 1 from Toyama, Japan
- MK Indy from MK Engineering (using Ford Sierra parts)
- Pegasus Automobile from Germany.
- PRB Clubman - manufactured Peter R Bladewell in Strathfield, Sydney Australia.
- Raptor by Tornado Sports Cars
- Several models from Robin Hood Engineering Ltd
- Rotus, originally built with components from Japan in Hagerstown, Maryland from the early 1980s to mid-1990s. As founder Chris Custer owned a Toyota dealership, the first cars used Japanese spec 2litre twin cam Toyota engines and five-speed gearbox. Other engines were used over the years; including Ford turbo 4s, Mazda NA and turbo rotaries, and Rover/Buick V8s. The Rotus notably features a slightly larger cockpit, stiffer chassis, and inboard front suspension.
- Southways Sports Cars SuperCat from Southways Automotive
- Stalker V6 Clubman by Brunton Automotive USA Bradenton, Florida the USA
- Superformance S1 Roadster
- Super Martin from France
- Tiger Z100, Tiger R6, Tiger B6, Tiger Avon (like Mel & Jons) & Tiger Cat E1 from Tiger Racing Ltd
- The TSV, a Lotus 7 replica from Greece
- Vindicator Sprint and the four-seat Vindicator Family by Vindicator Cars
- Westfield Sportscars produces several models
- Wilco produced in New Zealand between 1992 and 1996.

Also, see Category:Lotus Seven replicas
