= DAX Rush =

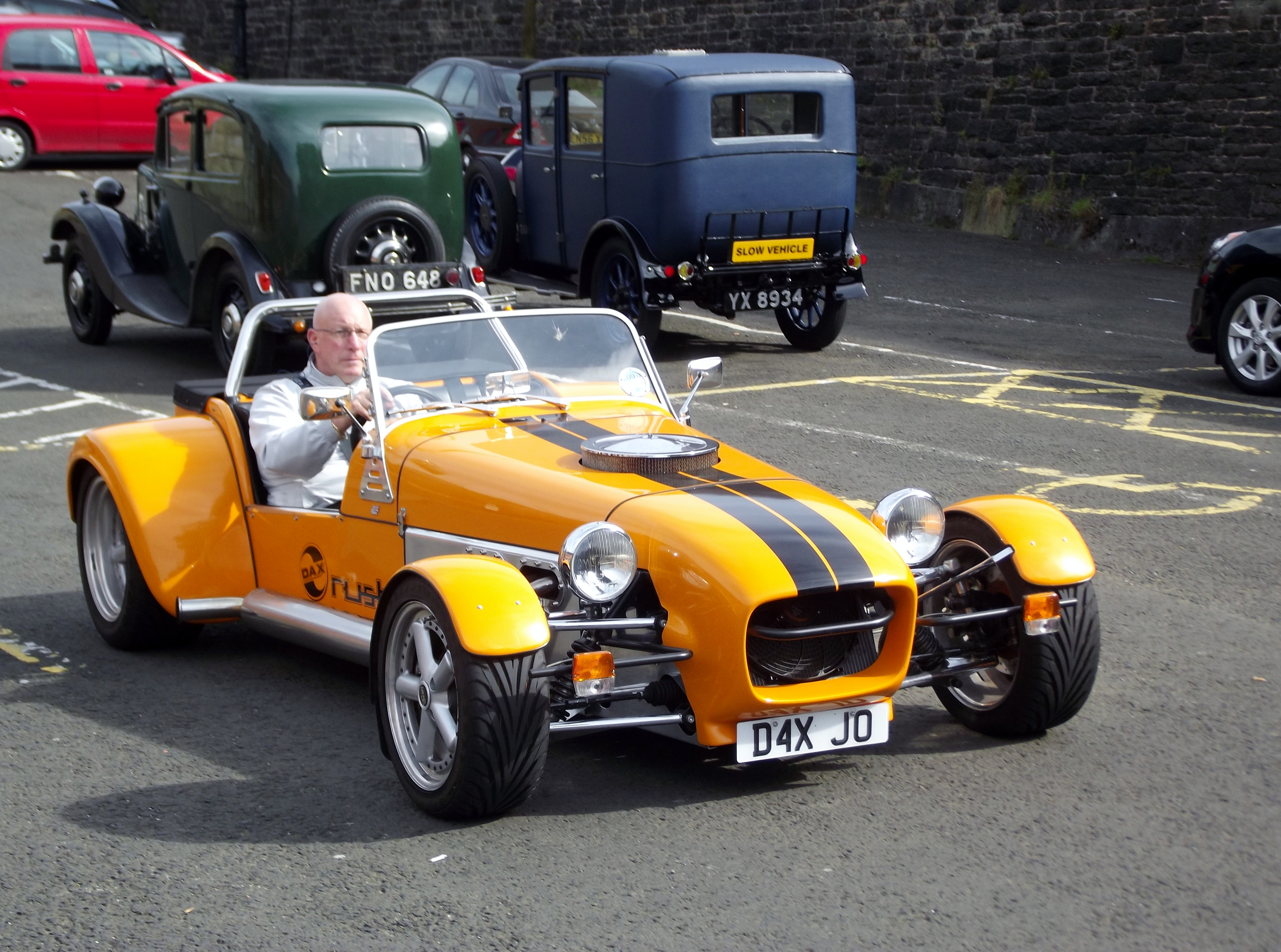
- 2009 DAX Rush

Overview
- Manufacturer: DJ Sports Cars International Ltd / M.A.N Motorsport since 2016

Body and chassis
- Class: Sports car
- Body style: Roadster
- Layout: FR or 4x4 layout

Dimensions
- Wheelbase: 2,310 mm (90.9 in)
- Length: 3,310 mm (130.3 in)
- Width: 1,855 mm (73.0 in)
- Height: 1,020 mm (40.2 in)

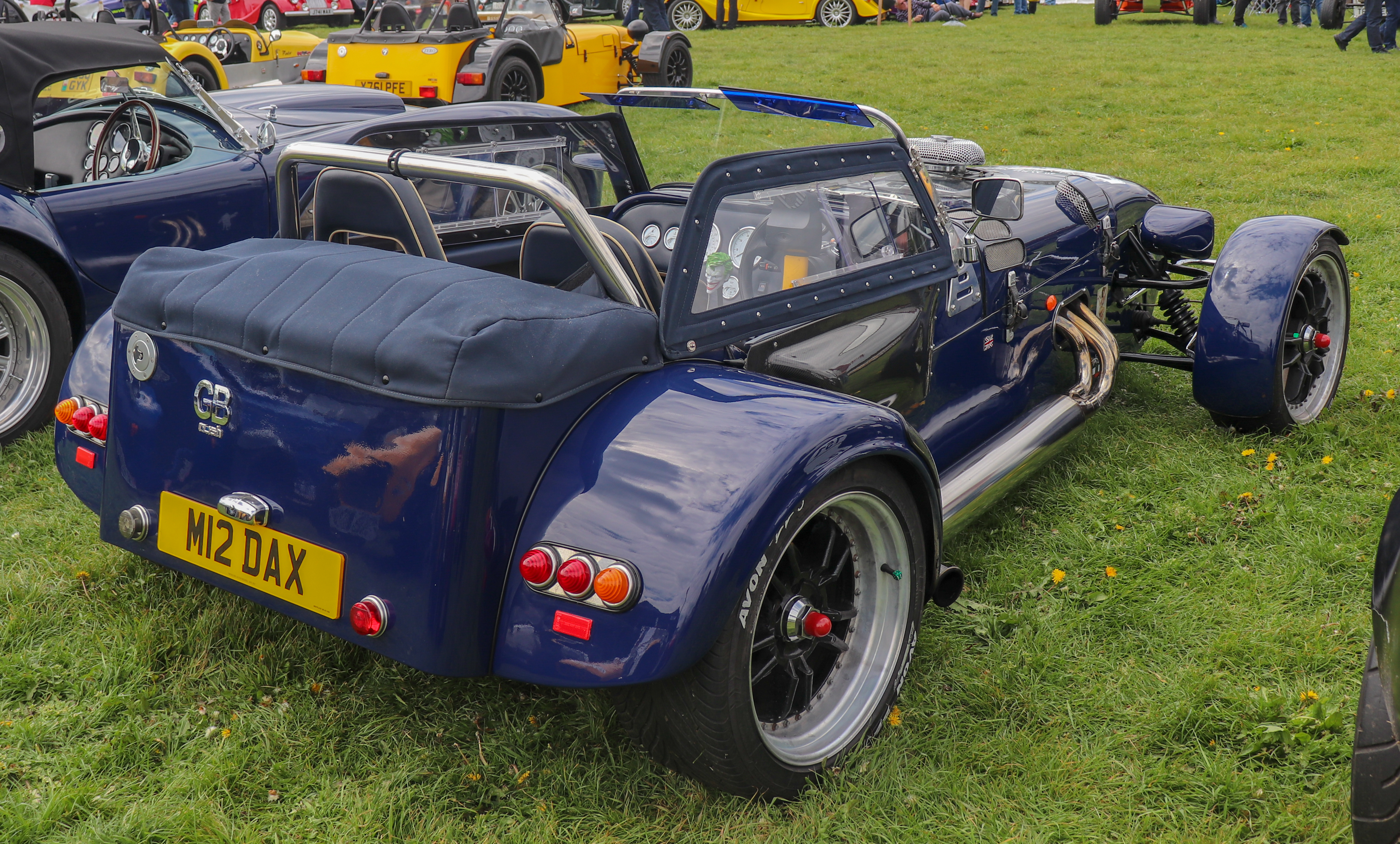
2005 Dax Rush 3.2 rear view

The Dax Rush is a lightweight two-seater sports car that is offered as a kit. It has a multi-tube triangulated steel space frame chassis, front engine and rear wheel or four wheel drive. The body is constructed in Glass-Reinforced Polymer (GRP) with optional aluminium side panels and bonnet. It complies with the Single Vehicle Approval (SVA) scheme. Two optional rear suspension technologies are offered; De Dion and the IRS (Independent Rear Suspension). The car is known for its 0–100 km/h performance of close to 3 second runs.

== History ==
DJ Sports Cars International Ltd built the first DAX Rush in 1991, however, as some cars are built on older chassis, the year of construction can be earlier than 1991. in cooperation with the German company Mohr, who produced replicas of the Lotus Super Seven, a license production of DAX Rush was started in England based on this replica. The DAX Rush Quadra was introduced in 1998 and the DAX Rush Motorcycle in 2001.

== Technical ==
The model has two main subcategories:

1. The car engine format with two optional set ups; rear wheel drive or four wheel drive (Quadra). Both options are offered with De Dion or IRS.
2. The motorcycle engine format; Rear wheel drive, based on a De Dion set up, constructed for a variety of motorcycle engines.

== DAX Rush De Dion and IRS ==
These two FR layout models are separated by the type of rear suspension selected. The front suspension on both models are based on parts from Ford Sierra, wishbones from DAX and Spax coil-over dampers. The Spax dampers are also used in the rear suspension. Both the De Dion and IRS rear suspension systems are based on parts from Ford Sierra and Scorpio Granada, and Dax's own suspension design. An optional choice for competition use is offered for the IRS; a Camber Compensation & Anti-Roll system (CC&AR). The brake system is a dual circuit, balance bar braking system that allows independent front and rear axle adjustments of the brakes. The brake parts are taken from Ford Sierra.

== Dax Rush Quadra ==
The F4 layout Quadra model uses the Ford Sierra RS Cosworth 4x4 transmission, transfer box, front propshaft and front differential with minor modifications. The rear suspension is the same as on the IRS FR model, but the front has modified wishbones to take the Ford 4x4 uprights with their driveshafts. The Quadra has a standard tyre dimension of 225 on both axles.

== DAX Rush Motorcycle ==
The FR layout motorcycle model has the same main specifications as the De Dion, and is only offered with this rear suspension. Motorcycle engines are used in this model.

== Car options ==
=== Engine ===
Standard engine options on the Rush De Dion, Rush IRS and the Rush Quadra

Ford OHC (Pinto)
Ford DOHC
Ford Zeta/Zetec
Vauxhall 16V
Ford Cosworth Turbo YB
Rover V8
Honda S2000 /> PSA racing

Standard engine options on the Rush Motorcycle

Honda Fireblade
Kawasaki ZX12R
Suzuki Hayabusa

=== 4x4 wheel options ===
Wheel diameter	Front (Tyres)	Rear-Wide(Tyres)	Rear-Narrow (Tyres)
15"	7,5"x15"x38mm inset (205/50/15")	10"x15"x6mm offset (255/45x15")*	8"x15"x9,5mm inset (225/50x15")
16"	7,5"x16"x38mm inset (205/45x16")	9"x16"x zero offset (245/45/16")	8,5"x16"x9,5mm inset (225/45/16")
17"	8"x17"x38mm inset (205/40x17")	9,5"x17"x zero offset	Not available
