= Chinkara Motors =

Defunct Indian vehicle manufacturer

- Industry: automotive, marine, aviation, ATV
- Founded: 2003
- Defunct: 2016
- Headquarters: Alibag, Maharashtra, India

Chinkara Motors, officially Chinkara Motors PVT Ltd, was a Mumbai, Maharashtra-based automotive manufacturer. Chinkara operated from 2003 to 2016. The company was headquartered in Alibag, Maharashtra.

They had a host of prominent customers, including Gautam Singhania. Chinkara created a unique fleet of sportscars called Parx Roadsters for Singhania.

== History ==
Shama Bothe and her German husband Guido Bothe founded Chinkara Motors in order to build sport cars. The company faced some initial funding problems. It took more than two years to manufacture and present its first car.

In 2003, at Mumbai Auto Show, company's first car was launched. The car is priced at Rs 6.7 lakh. They also presented the Chinkara roadster.

In 2004, at an Auto Show, Chinkara Jeepster was launched. The car was priced at Rs 3.98 lakh and had a fibre glass body.

In 2005, at Vaahan Yatra, India's first ever indigenous ATV, Roadster, was launched. Another sports car, Speedster, was also presented.

In 2011, Chinkara Roadster costed around Rs 26 lakh and a had minimum waiting period of five and a half months. The company manages to sell 2-3 units a year.

In May 2018, the State Consumer Commission ordered Chinkara to pay Rs 3.5 lakh to a former Army Captain for supplying him a defective speed boat.

== Automotive ==
Chingara primarily manufactured a 2-seat sports car called the Chinkara Roadster 1.8S, and the Jeepster, a classic 1940s Jeep look-alike. The vehicles were developed at Alibag near Mumbai, India. The name Chinkara comes from a local word for an Indian Gazelle.

=== Chinkara Roadster 1.8S ===
The Chinkara Roadster is derived from the Lotus 7. The car is put together out of parts from various Indian cars, including the Maruti 800 and the now defunct Standard Herald. While this allows the car to be reasonably advanced, it allows the use of intermediate technology to compete with a western equivalent that may be more an advanced. For example, news articles on the car say it uses MacPherson struts front and rear taken from a Maruti Alto. The Roadster is available in several levels of tuning.

- Price: INR 740,000 (excluding taxes)
- Engine: In-line, Isuzu 4 cylinder, 1.8 liter/1816 cc (Petrol), 116 PS (85 kW; 114 hp) @ 5000 rpm, 135 N⋅m (100 lb⋅ft) @ 3000 rpm
- Transmission: Five-speed Manual
- Brakes: Ventilated disc (front and rear)
- Tyres: Front – 205/50 R16, Rear – 225/50 R15 Goodyear F1 tubeless
- Performance: 6.7sec 0–100 km/h, 187 km/h, 13kmpl (all figures claimed)
- Length: 3,560 mm (140.2 in)
- Width: 1,760 mm (69.3 in)
- Height: 1,280 mm (50.4 in)
- Weight: 745 kg (1,642 lb)

=== Jeepster ===
The Jeepster is an off-road vehicle similar to the classic Willys Jeep. With its body constructed of lightweight FRP, the Jeepster can be delivered with a diesel engine or a 1.8L Isuzu petrol.

=== Other automotive products ===
Chinkara Motors also produced the following automotive products:

- Hammer – a sandrail fast attack vehicle for the Indian defence forces
- Rockster – All-terrain vehicle
- Beachster – Dune buggy
- Sailster – Wind-powered land vehicle
- Motor homes

== Marine products ==
The Marine division specialized in the manufacture of Fiber-Reinforced Plastic multi-hull (Catamarans & Trimarans) watercraft. They produced both powered and sailboat catamarans and powered trimarans Chinkara also builds the Wave Striker power catamaran and Predator powered trimaran work boats.

== Aviation Products ==
The Aviation division produced GFP gliders and powered gliders, Gyrocopters and Microlights.
