= Robin Hood Engineering =

British kit car manufacturer

The Robin Hood badge

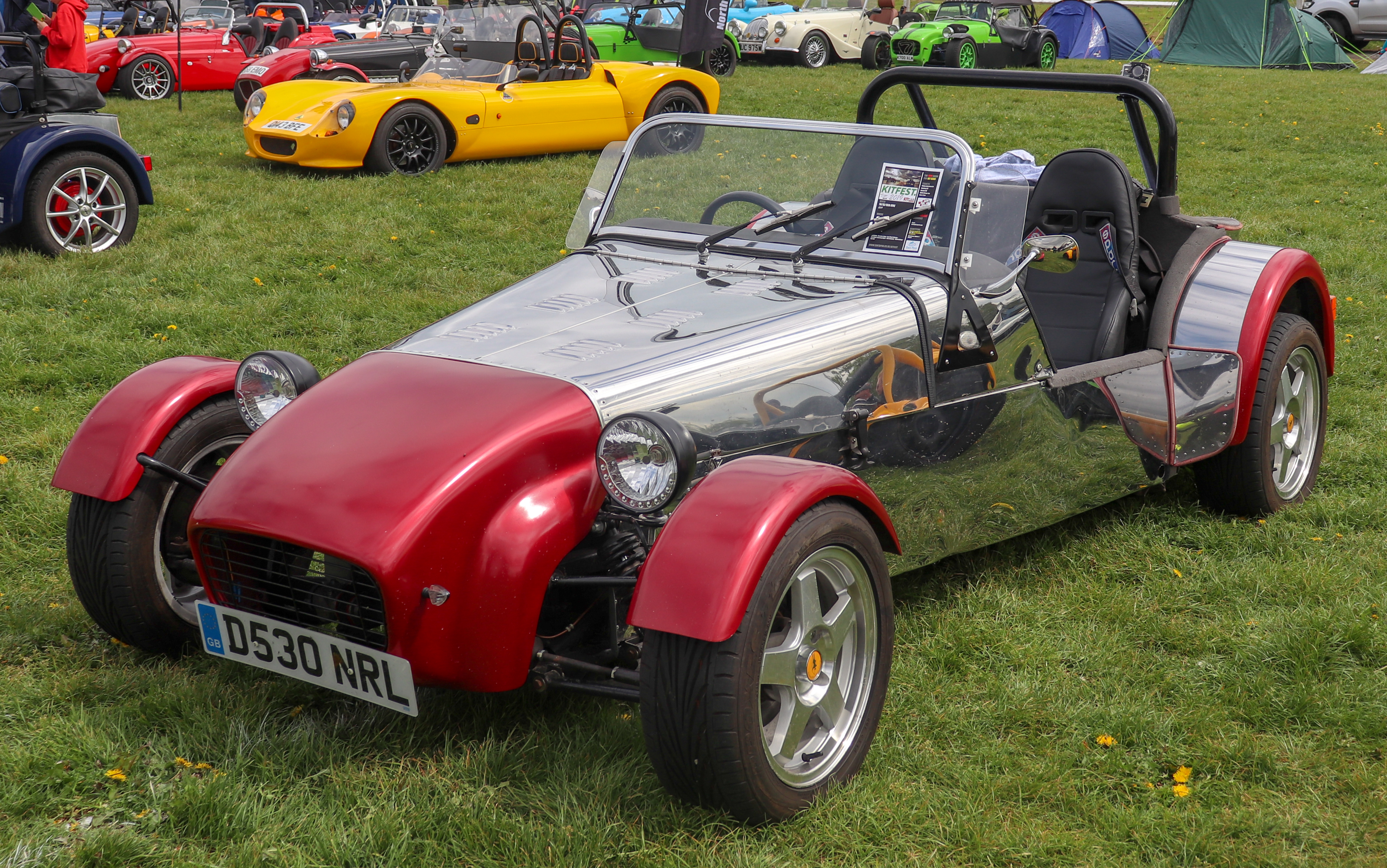
Robin Hood 2B Plus with 1993 cc Ford Pinto engine

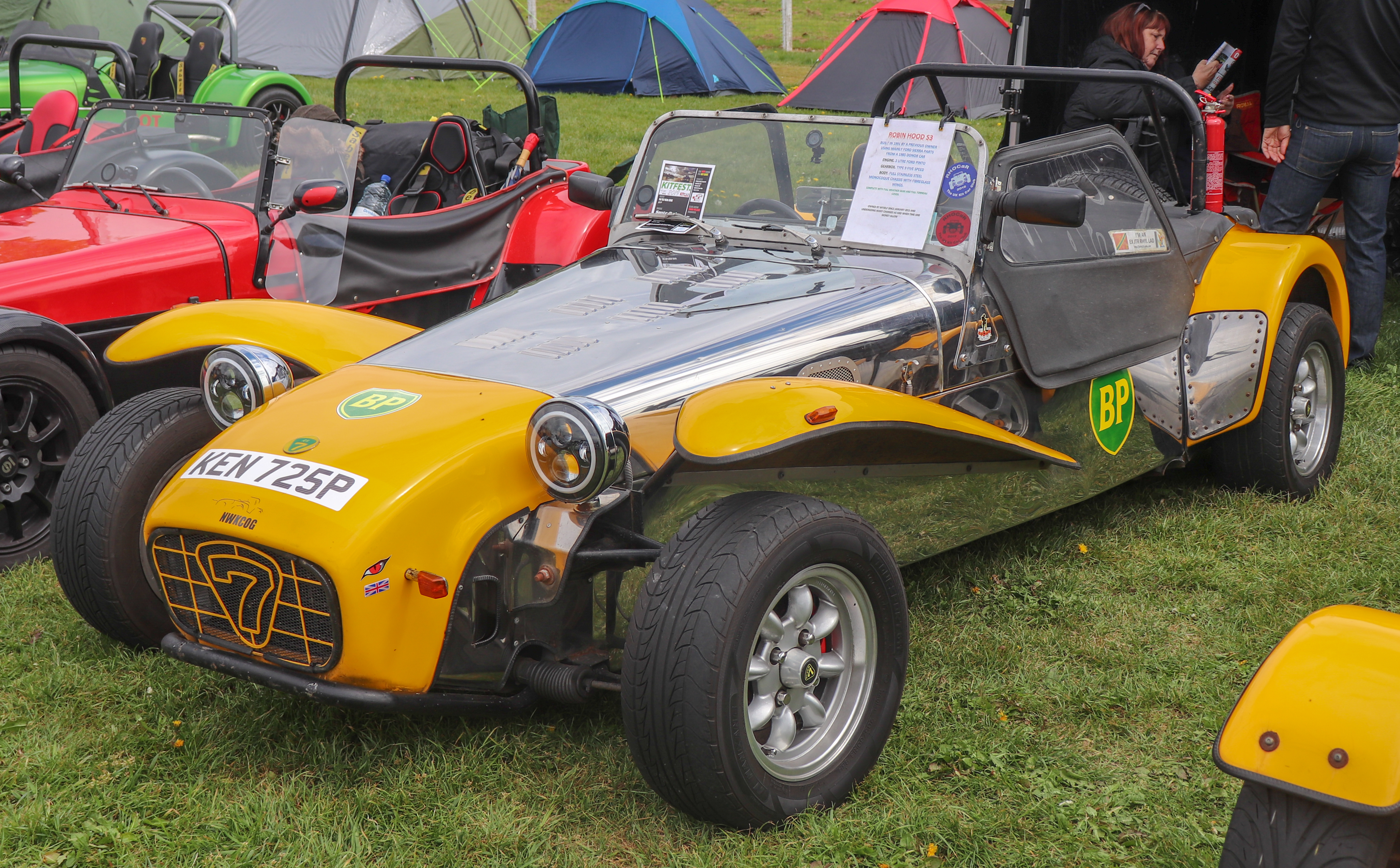
Robin Hood S3

Robin Hood Engineering Ltd was a British kit car manufacturer based in Mansfield Woodhouse, Nottinghamshire. The factory covered 30,000 square feet (2,800 m^{2}) and was on a one and a half acre site.

== History ==
The company was founded in 1980 in Sherwood, Nottinghamshire, by Richard Stewart, and started by making Ferrari Daytona replicas based on the Rover SD1 and later the Jaguar XJ12. The Lotus Super Seven was copied after the production by Lotus ended. it was the series 3 that was copied, not the series 4 that Caterham cars had bought the rights to.

In 1989, a Triumph TR7 based Robin Hood was introduced with the affordable price tag of £995 + VAT. Motoring enthusiasts showed their support and several kits were sold. Development of the new product was continual and feedback from customers showed that a range of engine sizes were needed, so that more people could afford to run such a vehicle. The Triumph Dolomite superseded the TR7 as donor vehicle, a popular choice with engines ranging from 1100 cc to 2000 cc.

High Court action from Caterham Cars almost stopped production; however, legal advice gave a remedy to the problem. Robin Hood Engineering were careful not to deviate from the strict guidelines set down as a result of the action. An agreement was reached and it was agreed that the word seven, or green cars with a yellow nose cone be used in RHE's promotions.

The Monocoque-style chassis (a structure formed from sheet steel without tubes) was manufactured using the Triumph Dolomite, Ford Cortina and Ford Sierra as donor vehicle. Although the donor vehicles and basic designs may have altered throughout the years, the main policy to supply value for money kits remained. Whilst other manufacturers had customers trawling scrap yards for an assortment of components to build cars, the Robin Hood policy of "one kit + one donor vehicle = car on the road" was a valuable selling point.

During 1996 and 1997 sales of Robin Hoods peaked at over 500 kits per year, and larger premises at Mansfield Woodhouse Notts, and extensive new CNC machinery were purchased to maintain production. In 1998, with the introduction of the single vehicle approval test, the public were not so keen to embark on a build, preferring to wait and see what was going to happen. Implementation dates were put off several times by the Government and the whole of the kit car industry suffered.

This period enabled Stewart to look carefully at Robin Hood Engineering's operations; then in his fifties, he ideally would have liked to have sold the business to allow him to concentrate on other interests. But with no offers forthcoming, the licence to manufacture Monocoque chassis about to expire and the recent heavy investment in new CNC machinery, the only option was to carry on with a brand new model.

With the assistance of a team of expert chassis designers, a revolutionary new chassis was conceived. The new style chassis was affectionately called the 'tubey' by staff and the 'Project 2B' (a reference to the affectionate nickname) was adopted as the kit name. Between the bulk collection dates of 21 August and 11 December 1999, exactly 205 kits were collected. Bulk collections have always been successful at Robin Hood Engineering, the record being one collection day in 1997 totalling 125 comprehensive kits.

In 2006 Stewart sold the assets of `Robin Hood Sports Cars' which were bought by Great British Sports Cars Ltd.

== The Zero ==
The most recent model by Great British Sports Cars is called The Zero. The Zero was designed to be small, lightweight, and purposeful car, suited to road and track use. It is available in nine colours, and compatible with a range of engines. It is available as a kit, partially assembled, or fully built.
