= Marc Nordon Racing =

British kit car manufacturer

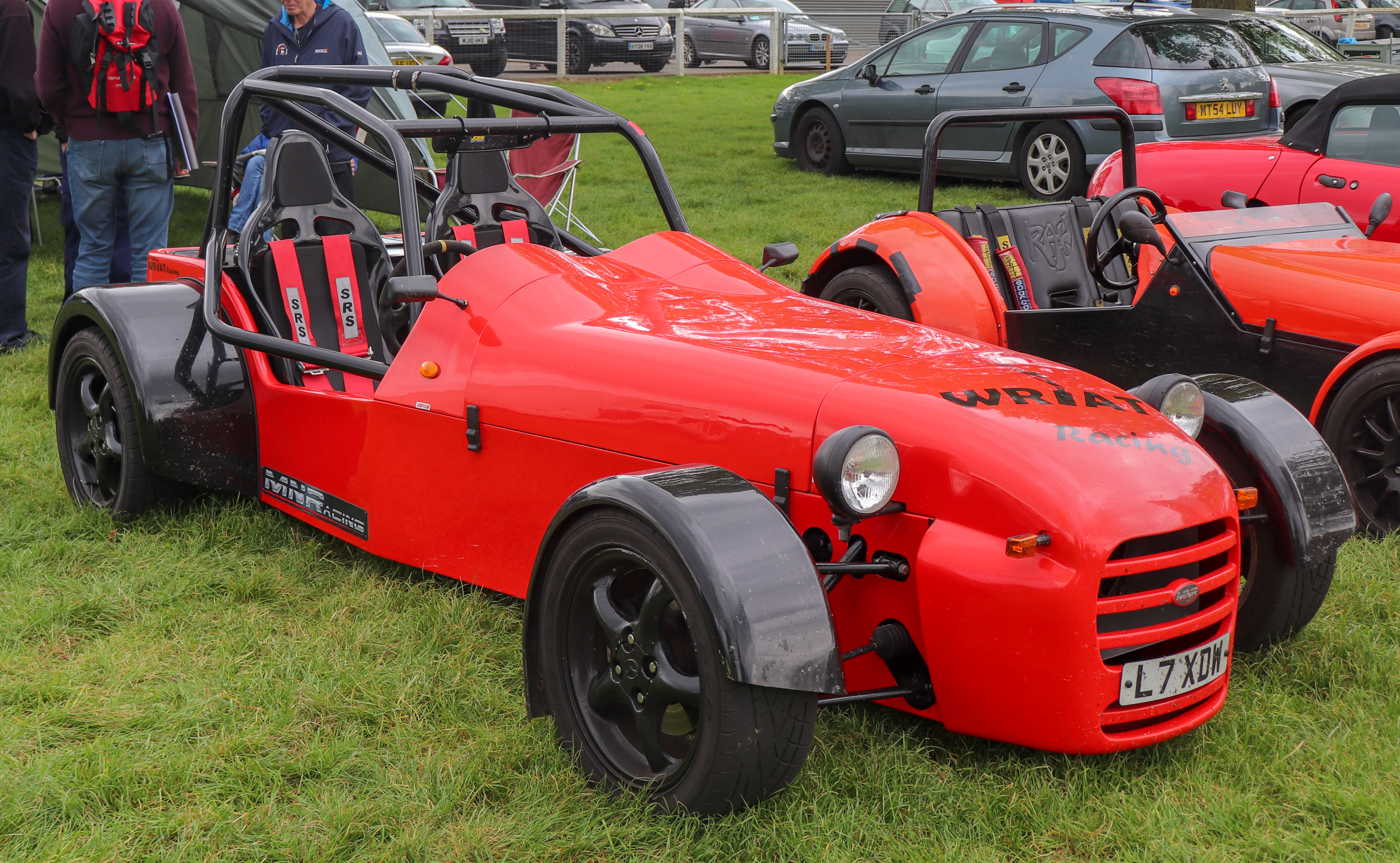
MNR VortX RT+

Marc Nordon Racing (MNR Sportscars) is a kit car manufacturer specialising in bike (motor cycle) engined cars or BECs and in particular, Lotus Seven Replicas. They are based in Harrogate, England.

MNR was formed by former BTCC Driver Marc Nordon in 2000 as a racing car rental business for "pay to drive" racing drivers who preferred not to purchase and maintain their own vehicles. In 2003, they started making the Vortx RT, a Lotus Seven inspired car based on Ford Sierra components. This was followed by the multi donor RT+ and RT Super using Ford Sierra Rear and Ford Cortina front end components combined with an inboard Rising Rate suspension setup.

Since starting they have diversified away from solely Lotus Seven replicas, and added to the range the mid-engined Tytan and LMP cars.

MNR achieved Top Ten in kit car volume sales within their first 18 months of commencing kit car sales
