= List of car brands =

This is an incomplete list of every brand (also known as make or marque) of automobile/car/motor vehicle ever produced, by country of origin, which has an article on Wikipedia. Names should not be added unless they already have an article. Some are from manufacturing companies that also use their company name as a brand name; others are from subsidiary companies or divisions, or are products of badge engineering. This is not a list of every brand that is available for sale in each country, but a list of companies that originated or have a significant independent presence in each country. This typically means manufacturing in that country and often exporting from that country, not just selling cars there.

== Argentina ==
=== Active ===
- Zanella (1948–present)

=== Former ===
- Anasagasti (1911–1915)
- Andino (1967–1973)
- Eniak (1983–1989)
- Hispano-Argentina (1925–1953)
- Industrias Aeronáuticas y Mecánicas del Estado /IAME, Mechanical Aircraft Industries of the State/ (1951–1979)
- Industrias Kaiser Argentina /IKA/ (1956–1975) <United Kingdom>

== Armenia ==
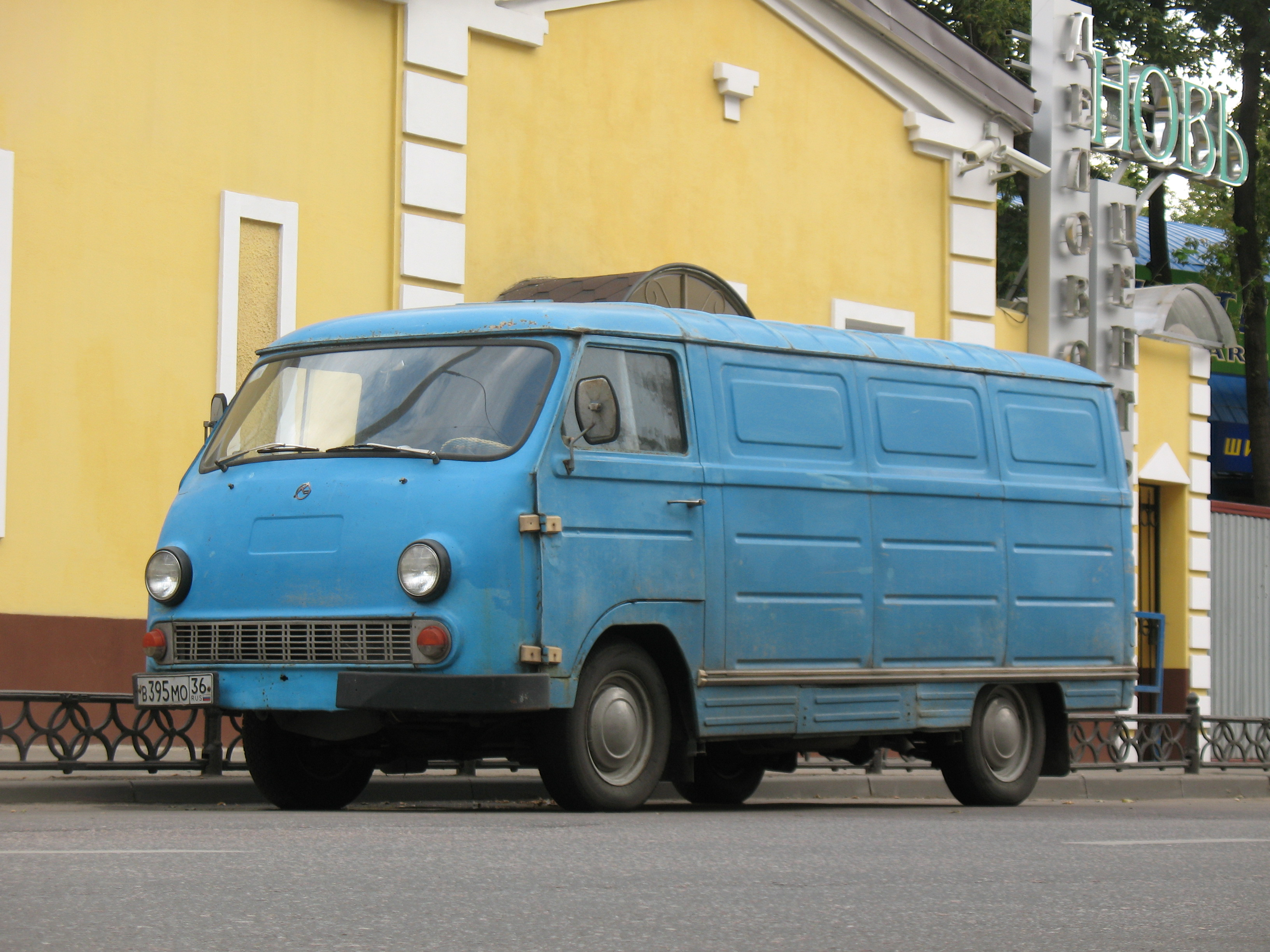
ErAZ-762V

=== Former ===
- ErAZ (1964–2002)

== Australia ==
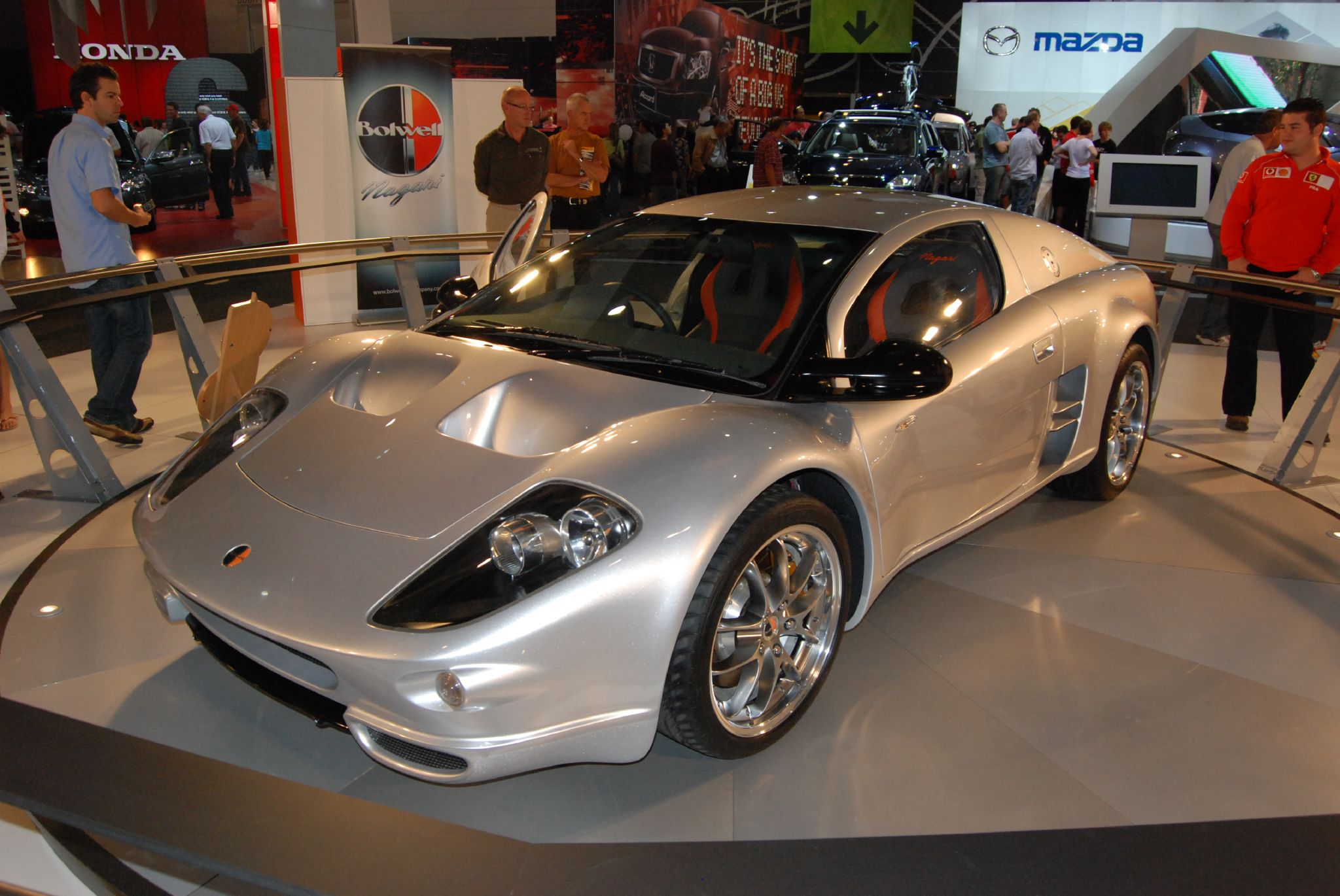
Bolwell Mk X Nagari

=== Active ===
- Bolwell (1979–present)
- Borland Racing Developments (1984–present)
- Bufori (1986–present)
- Bullet (1996–present)
- Devaux (2001–present)
- Elfin Cars (1958–present)
- Finch Restorations (1965–present)
- Joss Developments (2004–present)
- Minetti Sports Cars (2003–present)
- Nota (1955–present)
- Puma Clubman (1998–present)
- Python (1981–present)
- Spartan Motor Company (2004–present)
- Stohr Cars (1991–present)

=== Former ===
- Alpha Sports (1963–2005)
- Ascort (1958–1960)
- Austin (1954–1983)
- Australian Six (1919–1930)
- Australis (1897–1907)
- Birchfield (2003–2004)
- Blade (2008–2013)
- Buchanan
- Buckle (1955–1959)
- Bush Ranger (1977–2016)
- Caldwell Vale (1907–1913)
- Cheetah
- Chrysler (1951-1980)
- Ford (1925-2016)
- FPV (2002-2014)
- Giocattolo (1986–1989)
- Goggomobil (1958–1961)
- Hartnett (1949–1955)
- Holden (1948–2017; import: 2017–2020)
- HSV (1987–2017)
- Ilinga (1974–1975)
- Kaditcha (1972–?)
- Leyland (1973–1982)
- Lloyd-Hartnett (1957–1962)
- Lonsdale (1982–1983) /Cars produced and exported by Mitsubishi Australia and sold in the UK by the Colt Car Company under the Lonsdale brand/
- Pellandini (1970–1978)
- Purvis Eureka (1974–1991)
- Shrike (1988–1989)
- Southern Cross (1931–1935)
- Statesman (1971–1984)
- Tarrant (1900–1907)
- Zeta (1963–1965)

== Austria ==
=== Active ===
- KTM
- Magna Steyr
- ÖAF
- Puch
- Steyr Motors GmbH
- Rosenbauer
- Tushek & Spigel Supercars

=== Former ===
- Austro-Daimler (1889–1934)
- Austro-Tatra (1934–1948)
- Custoca (also known as Custoka) (1966–1988)
- Denzel (1948–1959)
- Eurostar Automobilwerk (1990-2002)
- Felber Autoroller (1952–1953)
- Gräf & Stift (1902–2001)
- Grofri (1921–1931)
- Libelle (1952–1954)
- Lohner–Porsche (1900–1905)
- Möve 101
- Steyr automobile
- Steyr-Daimler-Puch

== Azerbaijan ==
=== Active ===
- Ganja Auto Plant (1986–present)
- Nakhchivan Automobile Plant (2010–present)

=== Former ===
- AzSamand (2005–2010)

== Bangladesh ==
=== Active ===
- Uttara
- Walton Motors

=== Former ===
- Pragoti
- Runner Automobiles

== Belarus ==
=== Active ===
- BelGee (2011–present)
- Minsk Automobile Plant

=== Former ===
- Ford Union (1997–2000)

== Belgium ==
=== Active ===
- Edran (1984–present)
- Gillet (1992–present)

=== Former ===
- ADK (1930)
- Alatac (1913–1914)
- Apal (1998)
- Astra (1931)
- Auto-Mixte (1906–1912)
- De Wandre (1923)
- Delecroix (1899)
- Excelsior (1904–1932)
- Flaid (1921)
- Germain (1901)
- Impéria (1906–1948, 2009–2015)
- Jeecy-Vea (1926)
- Juwel (1928)
- Meeussen (1972)
- Miesse (1926)
- Minerva (1939)
- Pieper (1903)
- Pipe (1922)
- Ranger (General Motors brand) (1970–1978)
- Springuel (1912)
- Vincke (1905)
- Vivinus (1912)

== Brazil ==
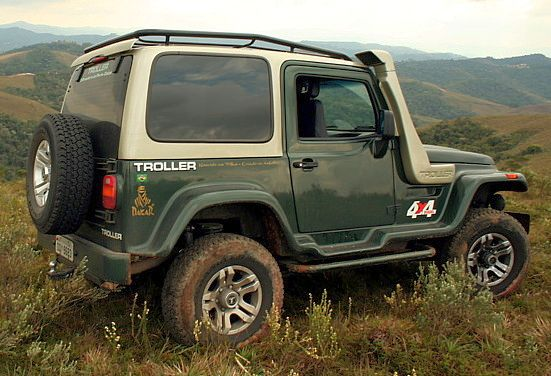
Troller T4

=== Automobiles ===
- Agrale (1962 - present)
- Amazonas Motos Especiais
- Busscar (1942–2012)
- Bugre (buggy)
- Chamonix (1981–2011)
- FNM (1942–1977)
- Gurgel (1969–1996)
- Lobini (1999–2014)
- Marcopolo (1949–present)
- Mascarello (2003–present)
- Neobus (1996–present) (Marcopolo Bus subsidiary)
- Obvio! (2001–present) (microcar manufacturer)
- Puma
- Sundown Motos
- Troller (1995–2021)
- Tecnologia Automotiva Catarinense (2004–present)

== Bulgaria ==
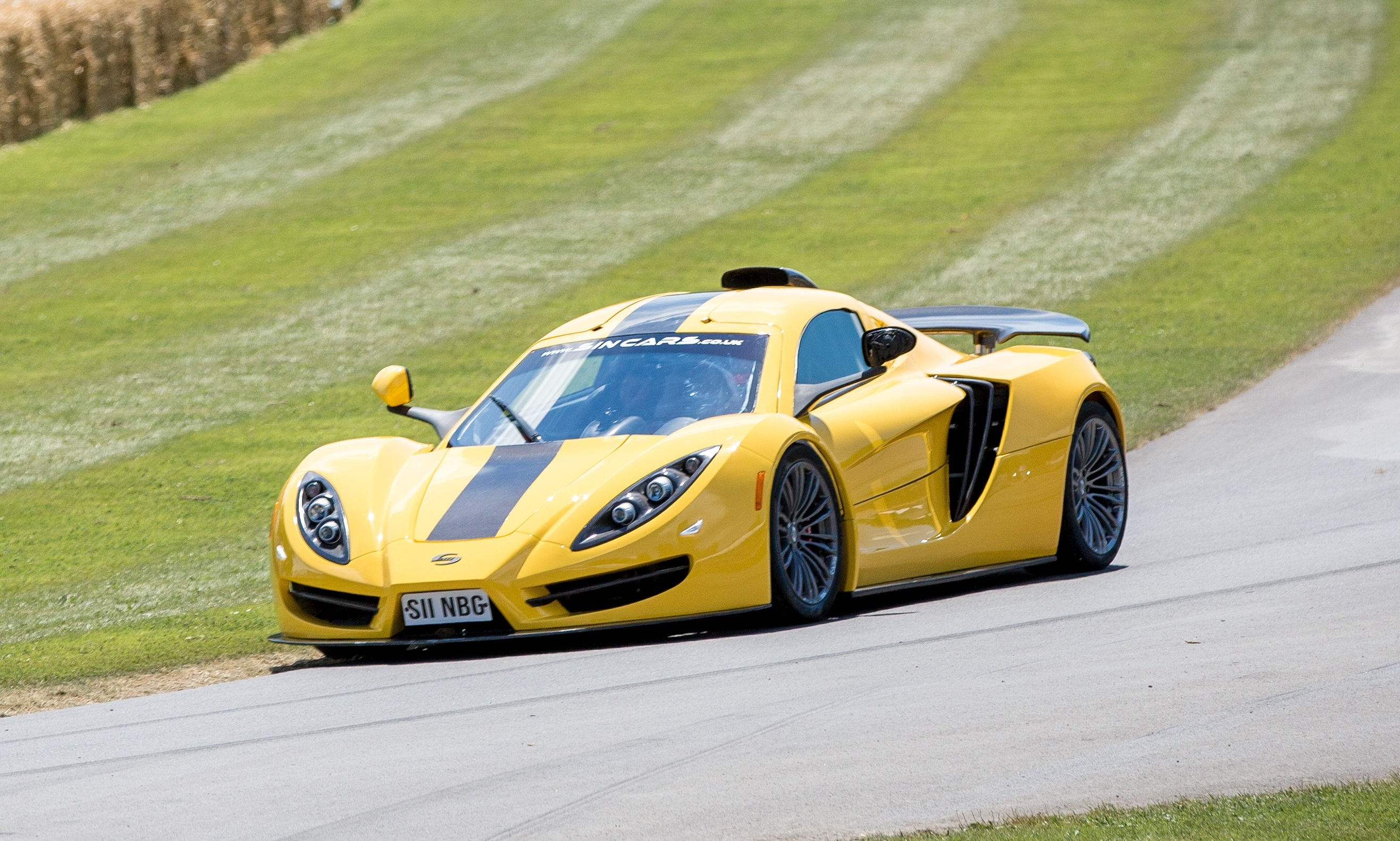
SIN R1

=== Active ===
- Litex Motors
- SIN Cars

=== Former ===
- Bulgaralpine
- Bulgarrenault
- Moskvitch
- Pirin-Fiat
- Sofia

== Canada ==
=== Active ===
- Campagna (1988–present)
- Canadian Electric Vehicles (1996–present)
- Edison Motors (2021–present)
- Fiat Chrysler Canada (1925–present)
- Ford Canada (1904–present)
- General Motors Canada (1918–present)
  - CAMI (1986–present)
- GreenPower (2007–present)
- Girardin Minibus (1935–present)
- Honda Canada (1969–present)
- HTT Automobile (2007–present)
- Lion Bus (2011–present)
- New Flyer (1930–present)
- Nova Bus (1993–present)
- Prevost (1924–present)
- TAV (-)
- Timmis (1968–present)
- Toyota Canada (1964–present)
- Vicinity Motor Corp. (2008–present)

=== Former ===
- Acadian (1961–1971)
- Amherst (1912)
- Asüna (1992–1995)
- Beaumont
- Bricklin (1974–1975)
- Brock (1921)
- Canadian (1921)
- Canadian Motor (1900–1902)
- Clinton (1911–1912)
- Colonial (1922)
- Dominion Motors Frontenac (1931–1933)
- Envoy
- Epic
- Frontenac (1959–1960)
- Gareau (1910)
- Gray-Dort (1915–1925)
- London Six (1922–1924)
- Manic GT (1969–1971)
- McLaughlin (1908–1922)
- Meteor (1949–1976)
- Monarch (1946–1961)
- Moose Jaw Standard (1916–1919)
- Queen (1901–1903)
- Studebaker (1963–1966)
- Tudhope (1906–1913)
- ZENN (2006–2010)

== China ==
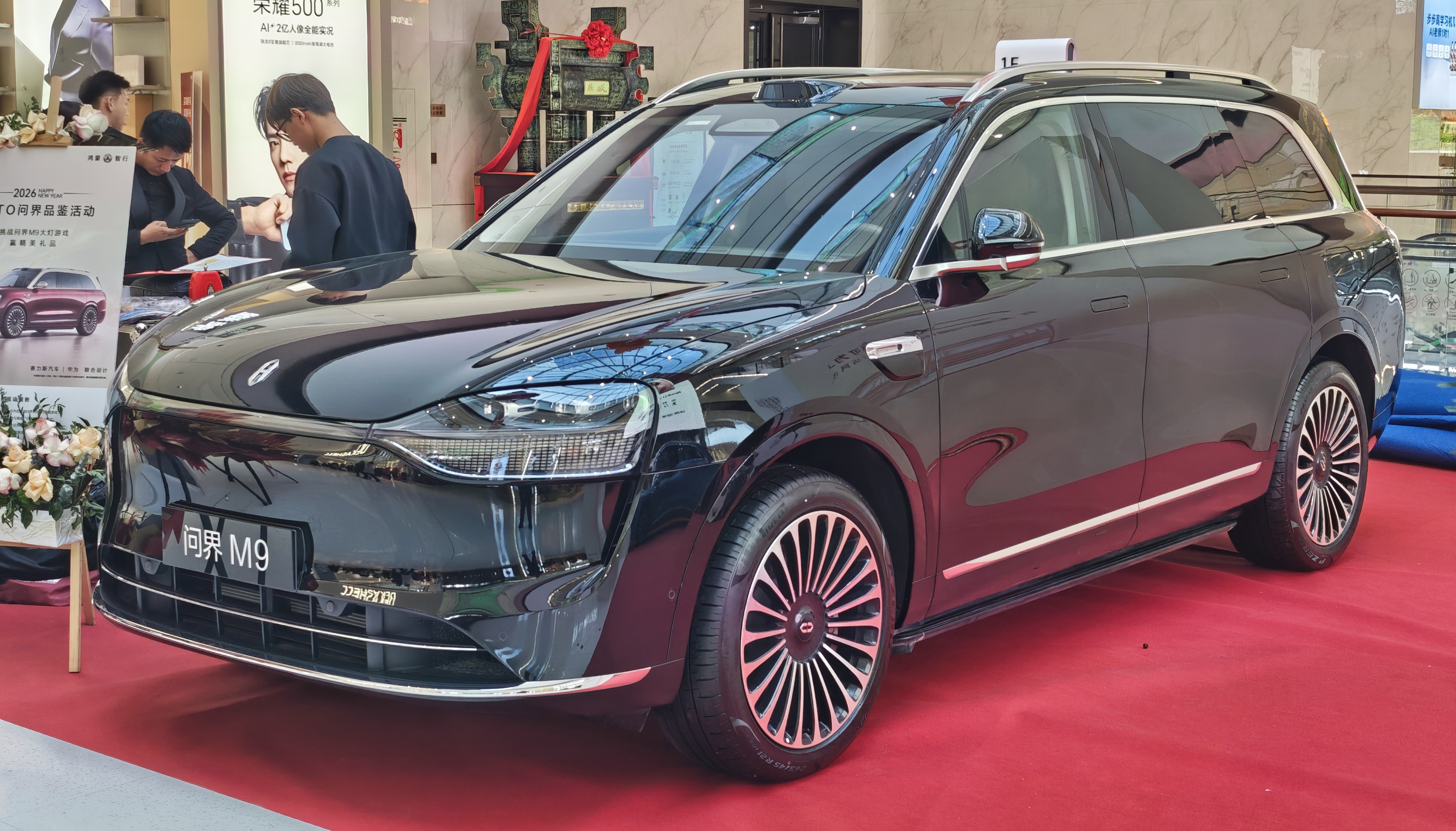
AITO M9

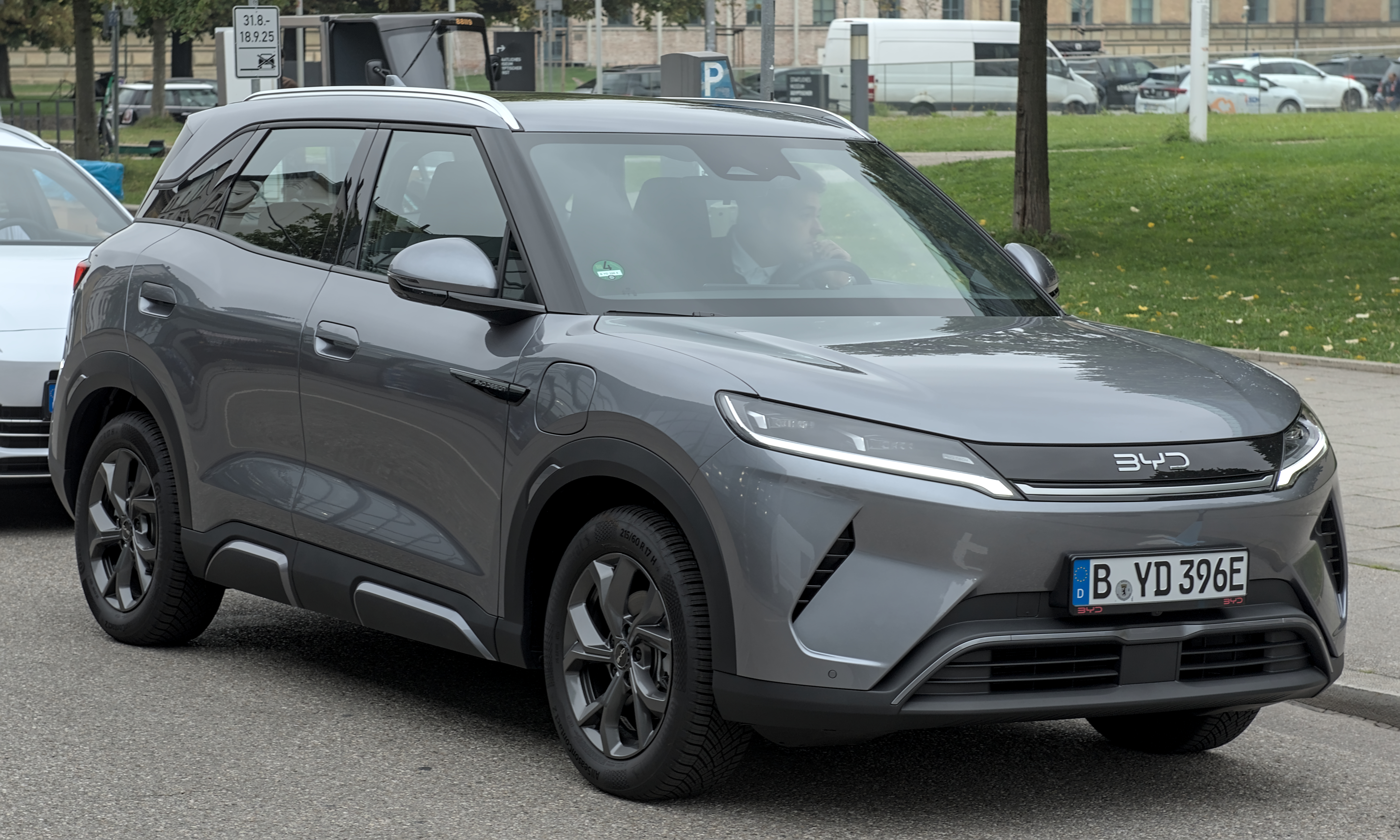
BYD Atto 2

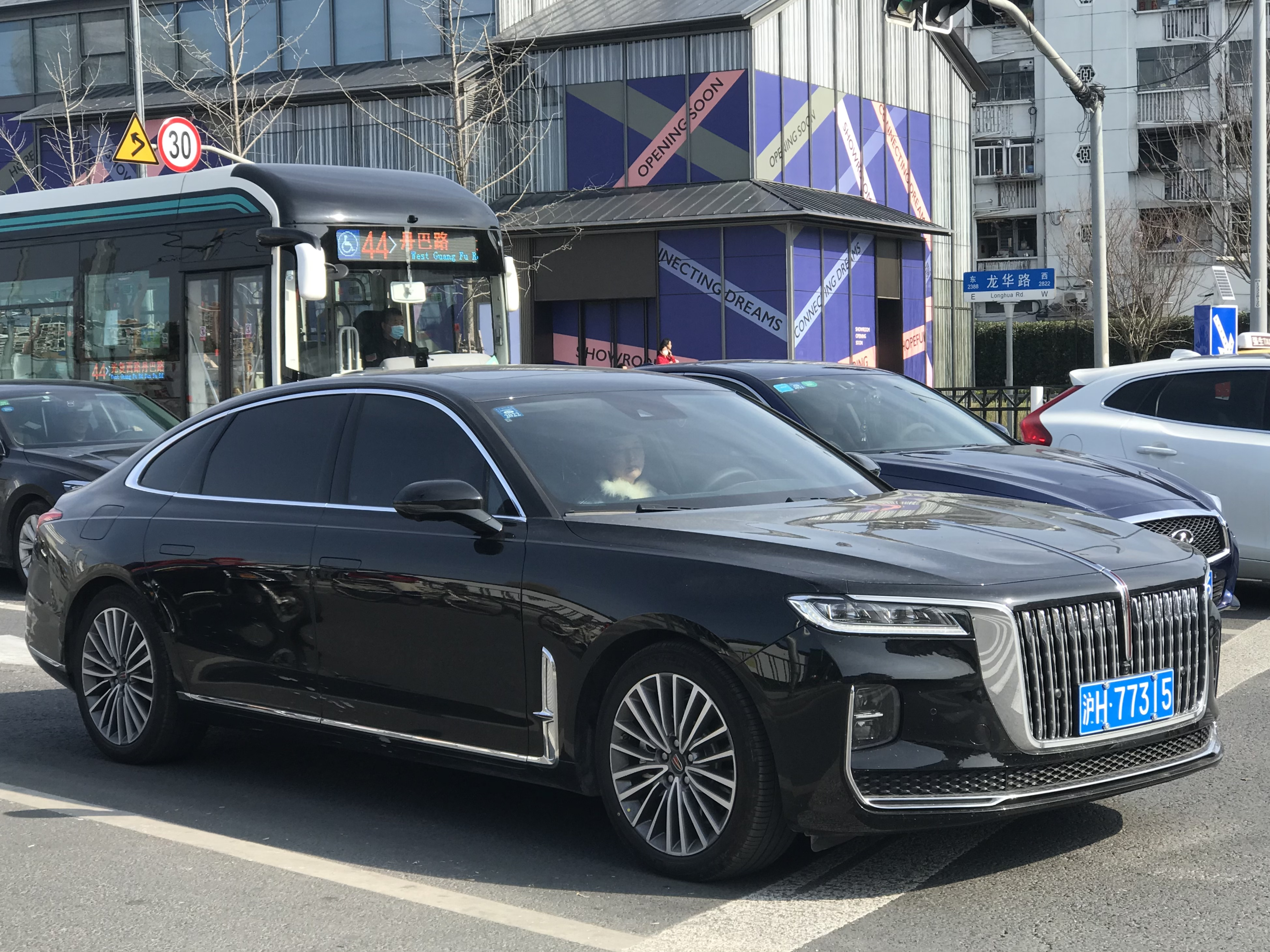
Hongqi H9

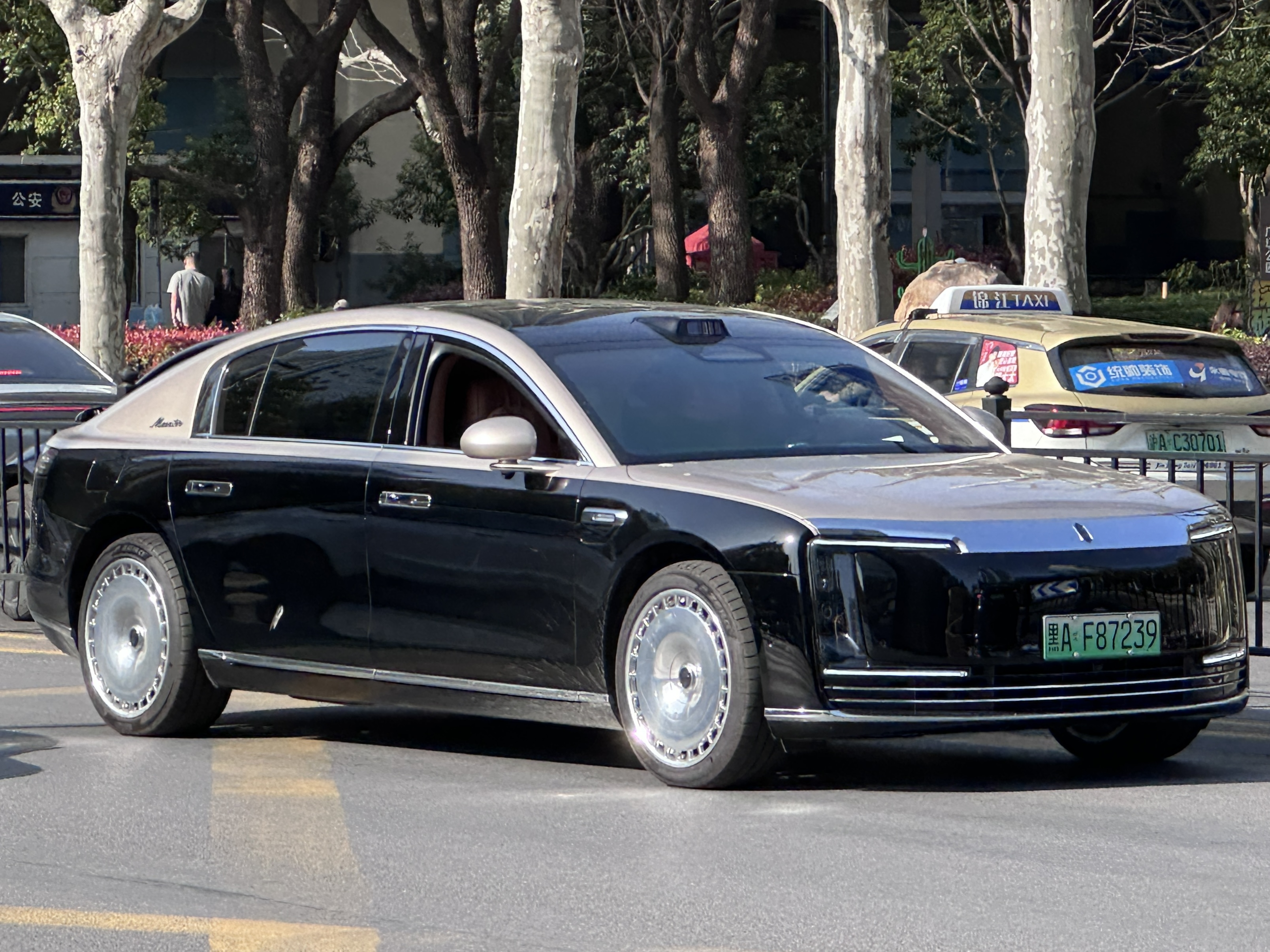
Maextro S800

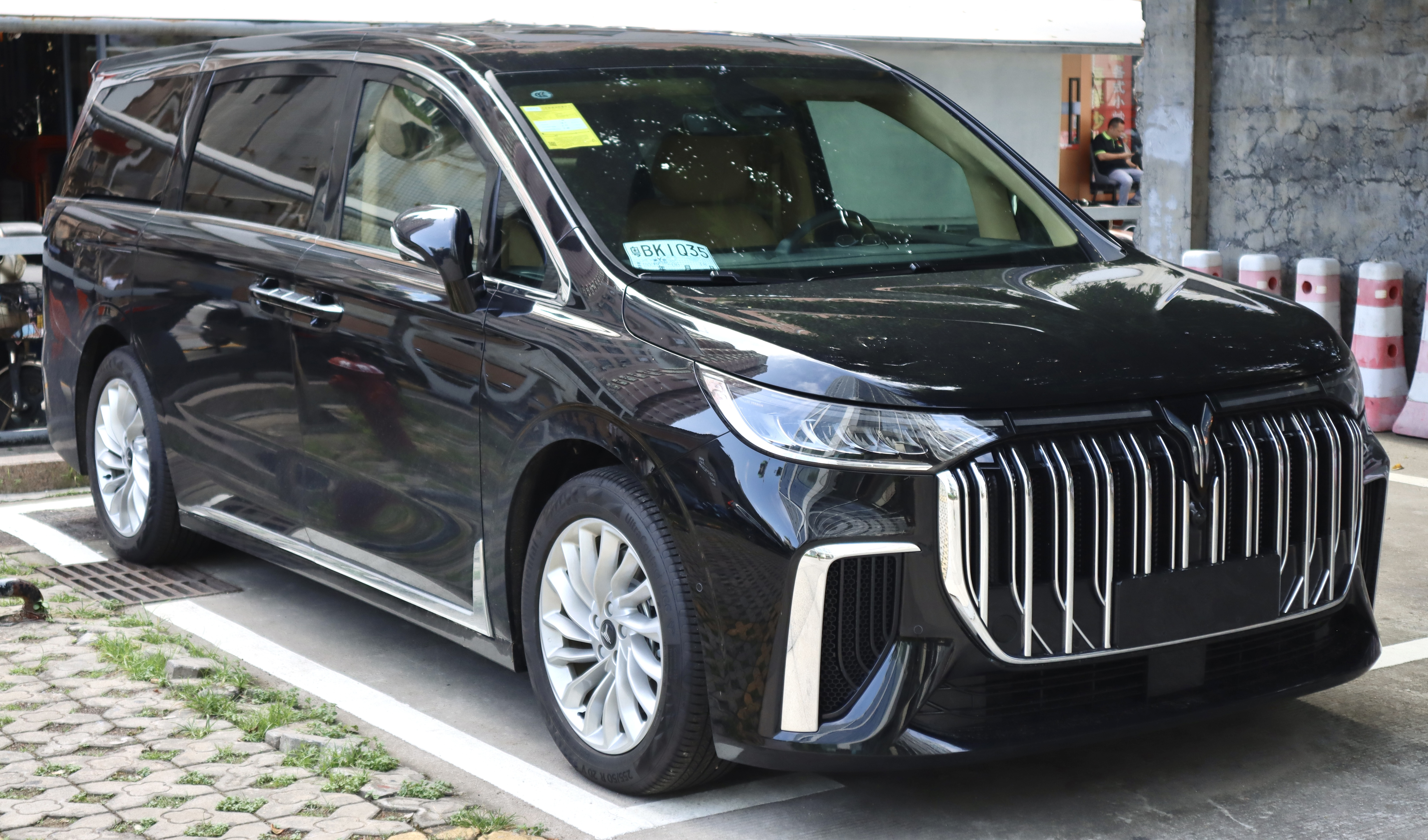
Voyah Dreamer

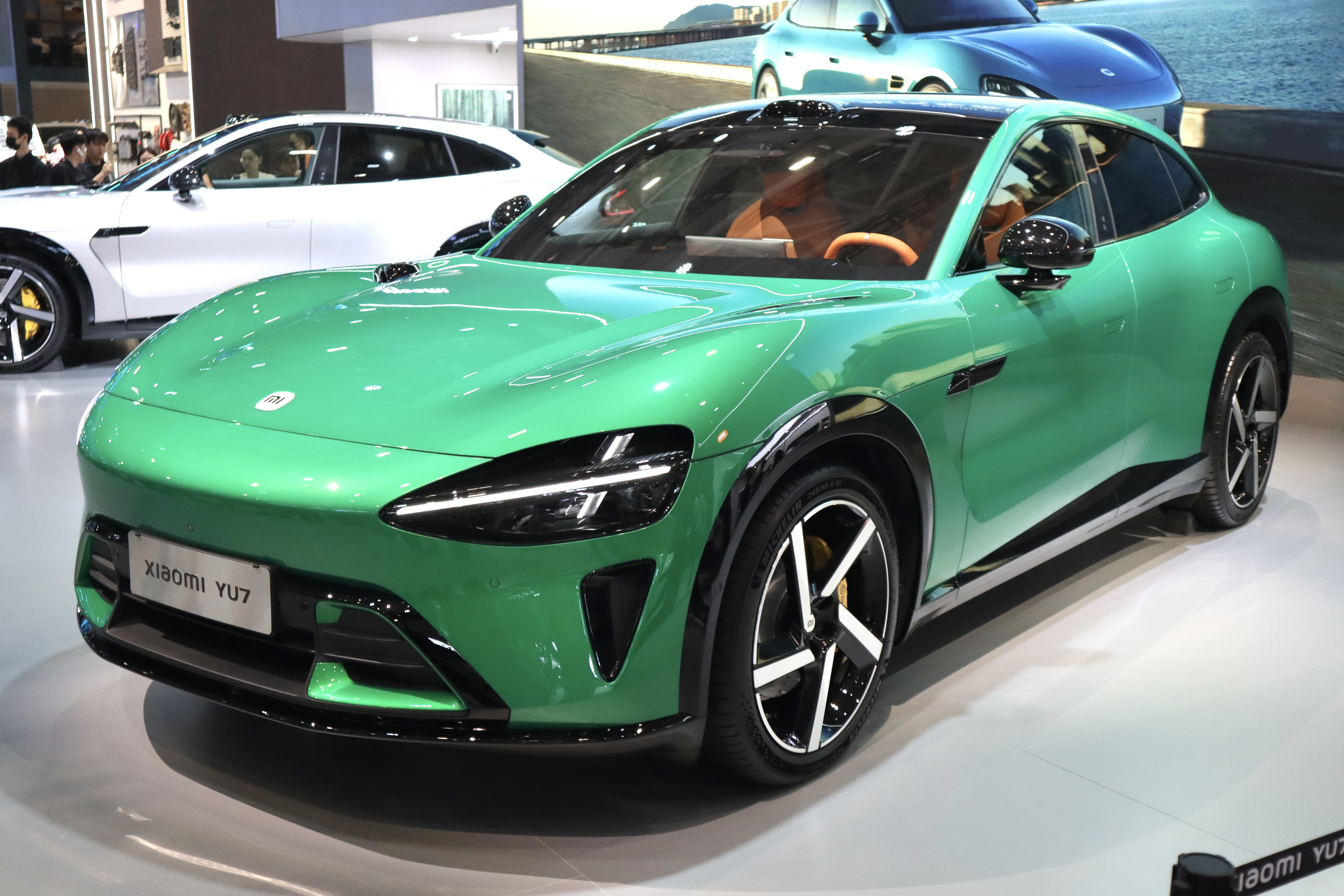
Xiaomi YU7

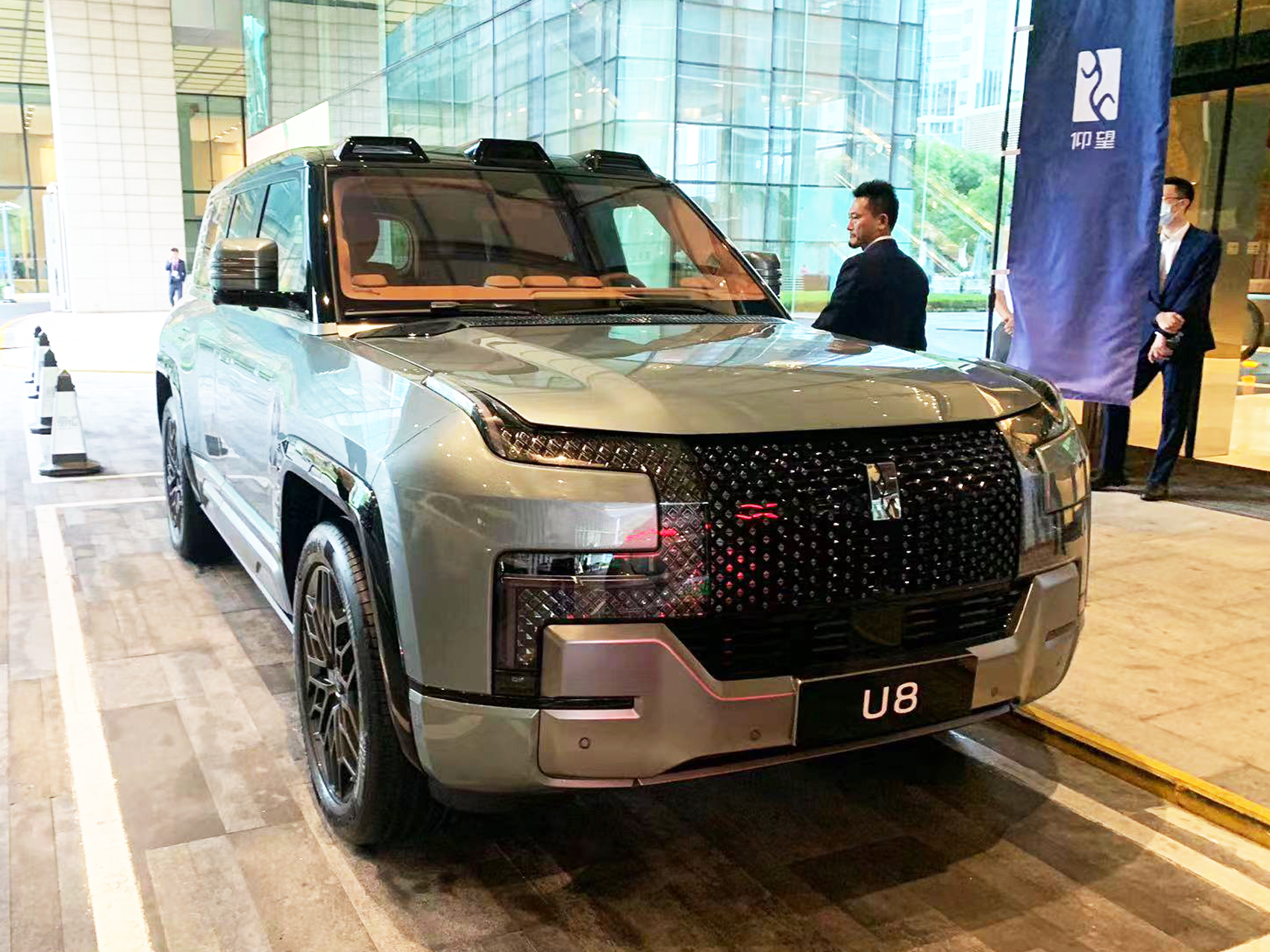
Yangwang U8

=== Active ===
- Aiways (2017–present)
- AUDI (2024-present)
- BAIC Group
  - Arcfox (2017–present)
  - Beijing
  - Beijing Off-road
  - Foton (1996–present)
  - Stelato (2024–present)
- Beijing Automobile Works (1958–present)
- BYD (2003–present)
  - Denza (2010–present)
  - Yangwang (2023–present)
  - Fangchengbao (2023–present)
  - Linghui (2026–present)
- Chang'an Motors (1990–present)
  - Avatr Technology
  - Changan (since 1862)
    - Changan Nevo
  - Deepal
- Chery Automobile (1997–present)
  - Chery New Energy
  - Exeed
  - Freelander (2024–present)
  - iCar
  - Jetour
  - Jaecoo
  - Lepas
  - Luxeed (2023–present)
  - Omoda
  - Soueast
- Dongfeng (1969–present)
  - Dongfeng Fengshen
  - Dongfeng Nammi (2023–present)
  - M-Hero (2022–present)
  - Venucia (2010–present)
  - Voyah (2020–present)
- First Automotive Works (FAW) (1953–present)
  - Bestune (2006–present)
  - Haima Automobile (2004–present)
  - Hongqi (Red Flag) (1958–present)
  - Huali
- Geely (Jili) (1998–present)
  - Geely Auto
    - Geely Galaxy
  - Zeekr (2021–present)
    - Lynk & Co (2016–present)
  - Shanghai Maple Guorun Automobile (2003–present)
- Great Wall Motors (1984–present)
  - Haval
  - Ora (2018–present)
  - Tank (2021–present)
  - Wey (2016–present)
- GAC Group (1954–present)
  - Aion
  - Aistaland
  - Hyptec
  - Everus (2010–present)
  - Trumpchi
- Human Horizons (2017–present)
  - Jinbei (1992–present)
- Hwanghai
- JAC Motors (1964–present)
  - Maextro (2025–present)
- Jetta (2019–present)
- Jiangling (1993–present)
  - JMC
  - Yusheng
  - Landwind
- Jonway (2005–present)
- King Long (1988–present)
- Leapmotor (2015–present)
- Li Auto (2015–present)
- Lifan (2005–present)
  - Huayang
- Nanjing Golden Dragon Bus (2000–present)
- Nio (2014–present)
  - Onvo (2024–present)
  - Firefly (2024–present)
- SAIC Motor
  - Baojun (2010–present)
  - IM Motors (2020–present)
  - SAIC (2025–present)
  - Huajing (2026–present)
  - Maxus
  - MG Motor
  - Yuejin (1995–present)
  - Roewe (2006–present)
    - Rising Auto (2020–present)
  - Wuling (1958–present)
- Seres (1986–present)
  - AITO (2021–present)
  - DFSK (2003–present)
  - Fengon (2013–present)
- Shaanxi Automobile Group
- Sichuan Tengzhong
- Techrules (2015–present)
- Xinkai (1984–present)
- XPeng (2014–present)
- Yema Auto (1994–present)
- Yutong
- ZX Auto (1999–present)
- Xiaomi Auto (2021–present)

=== Former ===
- Baolong (1998–2005)
- Byton (2016–2021)
- Changhe (1970–2022)
- Changfeng Motor
- Landwind
- Dadi (1988–2012)
- Foday (1996–2020)
- Geely Geometry
- Gonow
- Hawtai (Huatai)
- Hozon (Neta)
- Huachen (Brilliance)
- Hafei (1980–2015)
- FAW Tianjin (Xiali) (1986–2020)
- Oshan (2010–2024)
- Polarsun Automobile (2004–2018)
- Qoros (2013–2022)
- Senova (2012–2020)
- Shuanghuan (1998–2016)
- Youngman (2001–2019)
- Zotye (2005–2021)

== Croatia ==
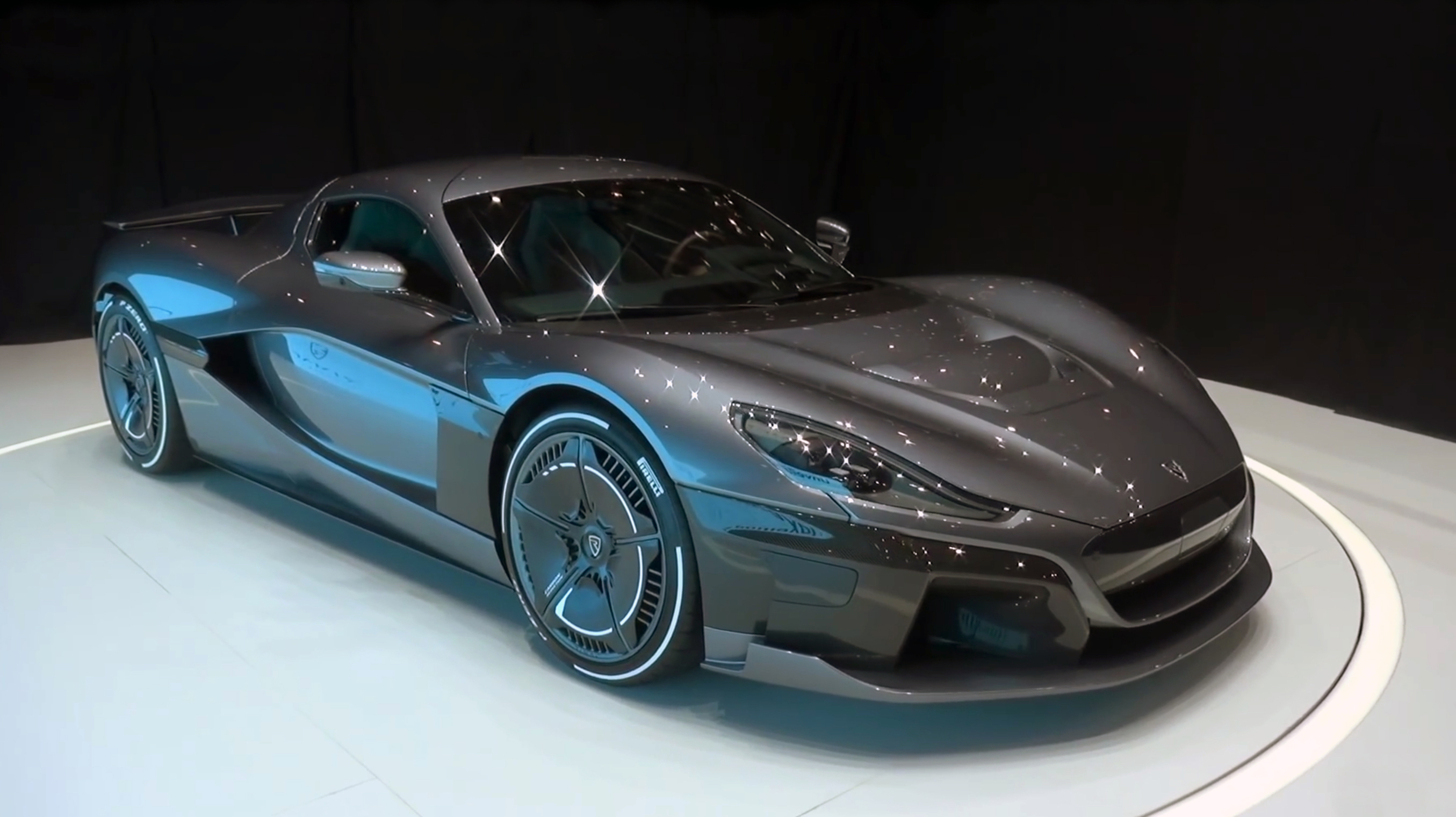
Rimac C Two

=== Active ===
- Đuro Đaković
- DOK-ING
- Rimac

=== Former ===
- TAZ

== Czech Republic ==
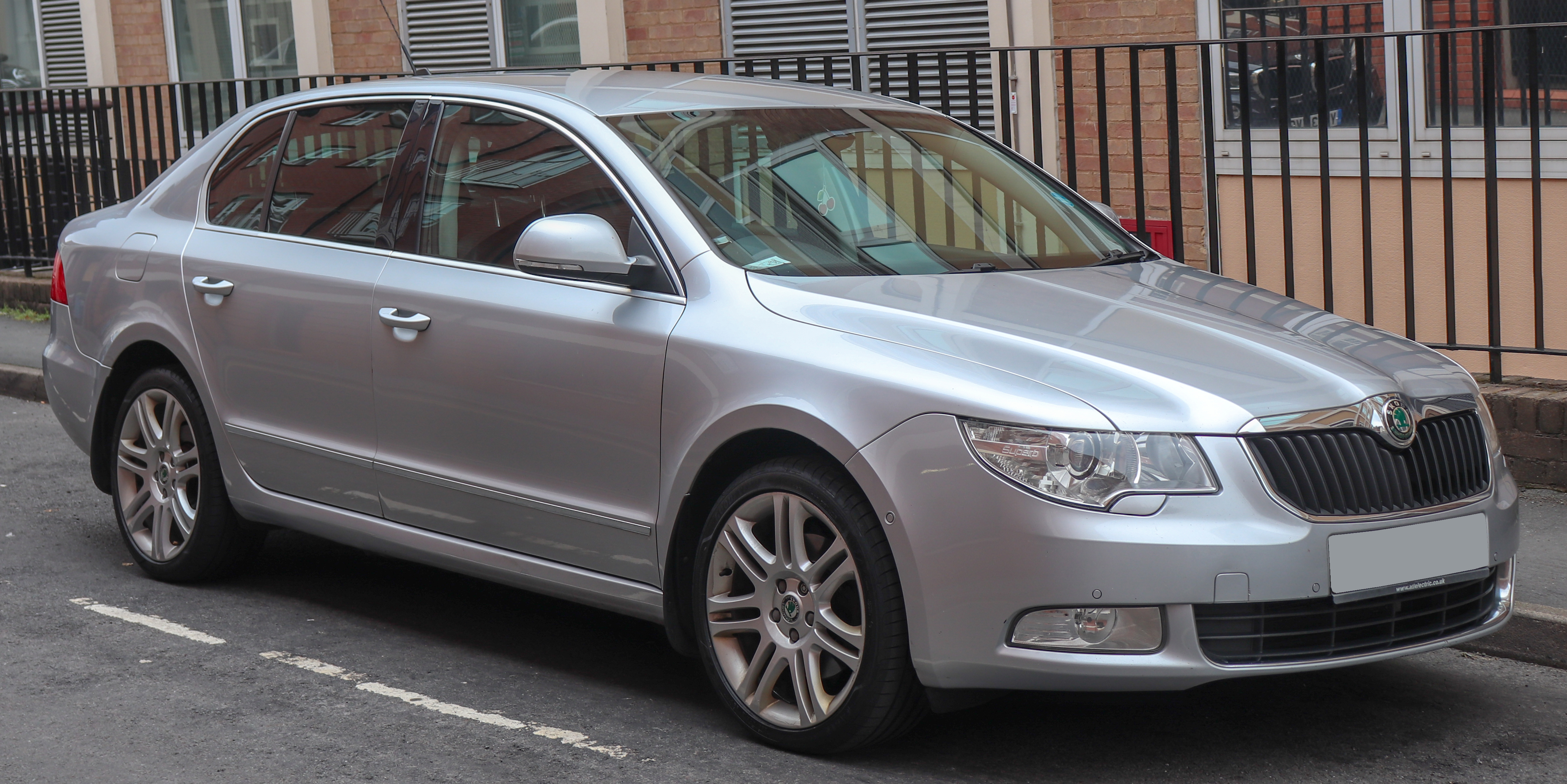
Škoda Superb

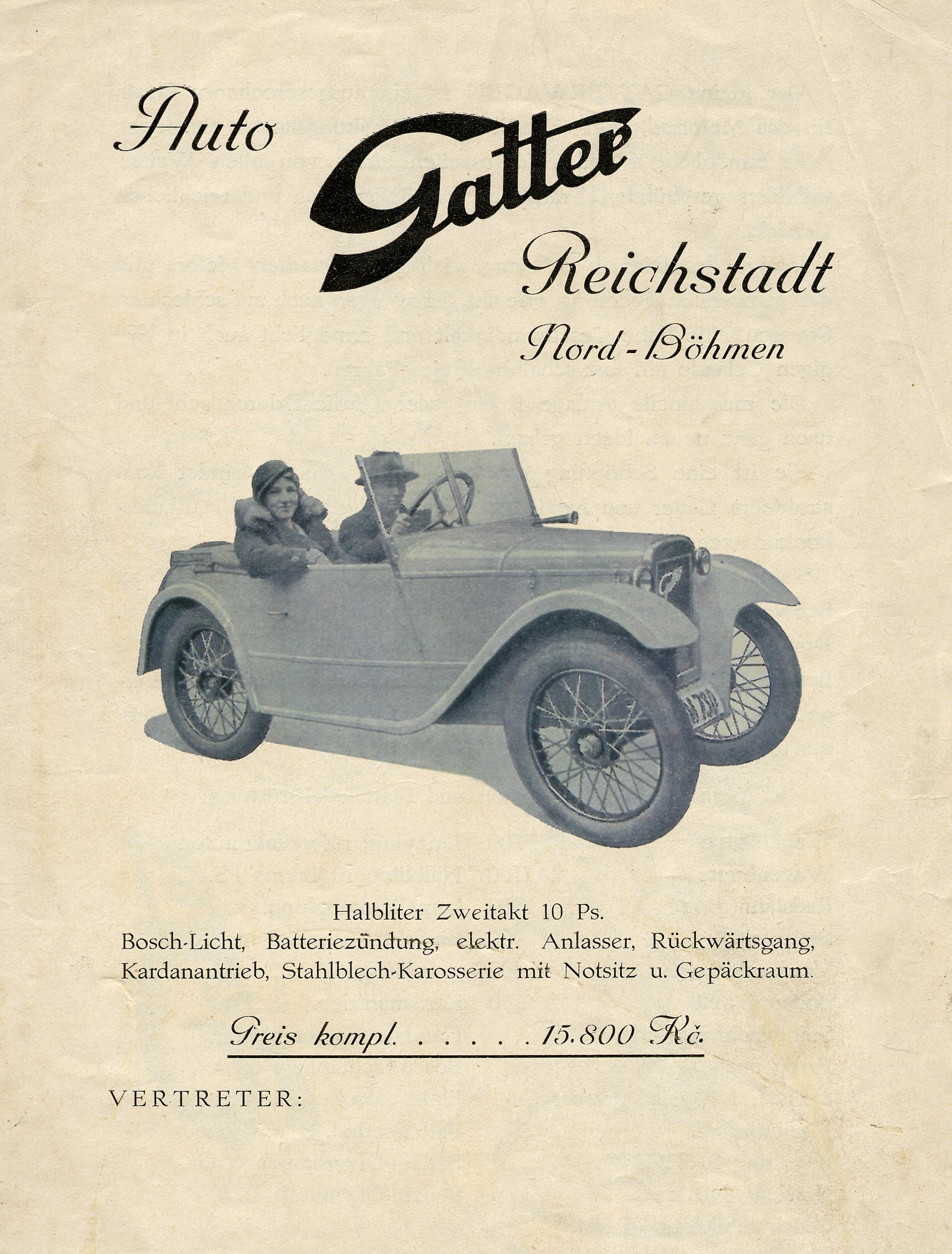
Advertisement for the Small Gatter in 1934

=== Active ===
- Avia (1919–present)
- Jawa (1929–present)
- Kaipan (1997–present)
- Karosa (1896–present) (since 2007 Iveco Bus)
- MTX / Metalex (1969–present)
- MW Motors (2010–present)
- Praga (1907–present)
- Škoda (1895–present)
- Tatra (1850–present)

=== Former ===
- Aero (1929–1947)
- Aspa (1924–1925)
- Gatter (1926–1937)
- LIAZ (1951–2002)
- Stelka (1920–1922)
- Velorex (1951–1971)
- Walter (1909–1954)
- Wikov (1922–1935)
- Zbrojovka Brno (1923–1936)

== Denmark ==
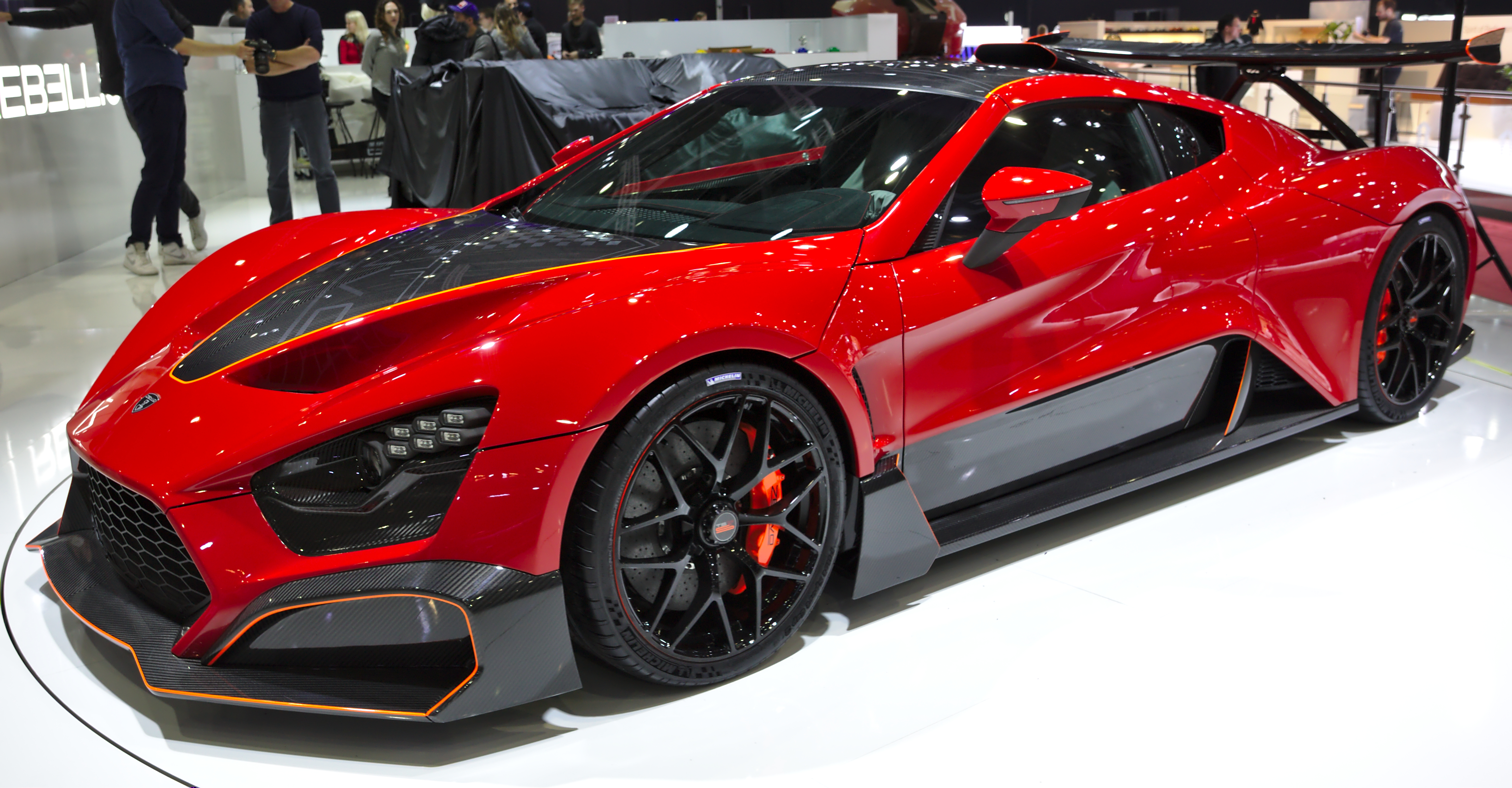
Zenvo TSR-S

=== Active ===
- PVP Karting
- Zenvo Automotive (2004–present)

=== Former ===
- Anglo-Dane (1902–1917)
- Brems (1900 and 1907)
- Dansk (1901–1907)
- Krampers (1890–1960)

== Egypt ==
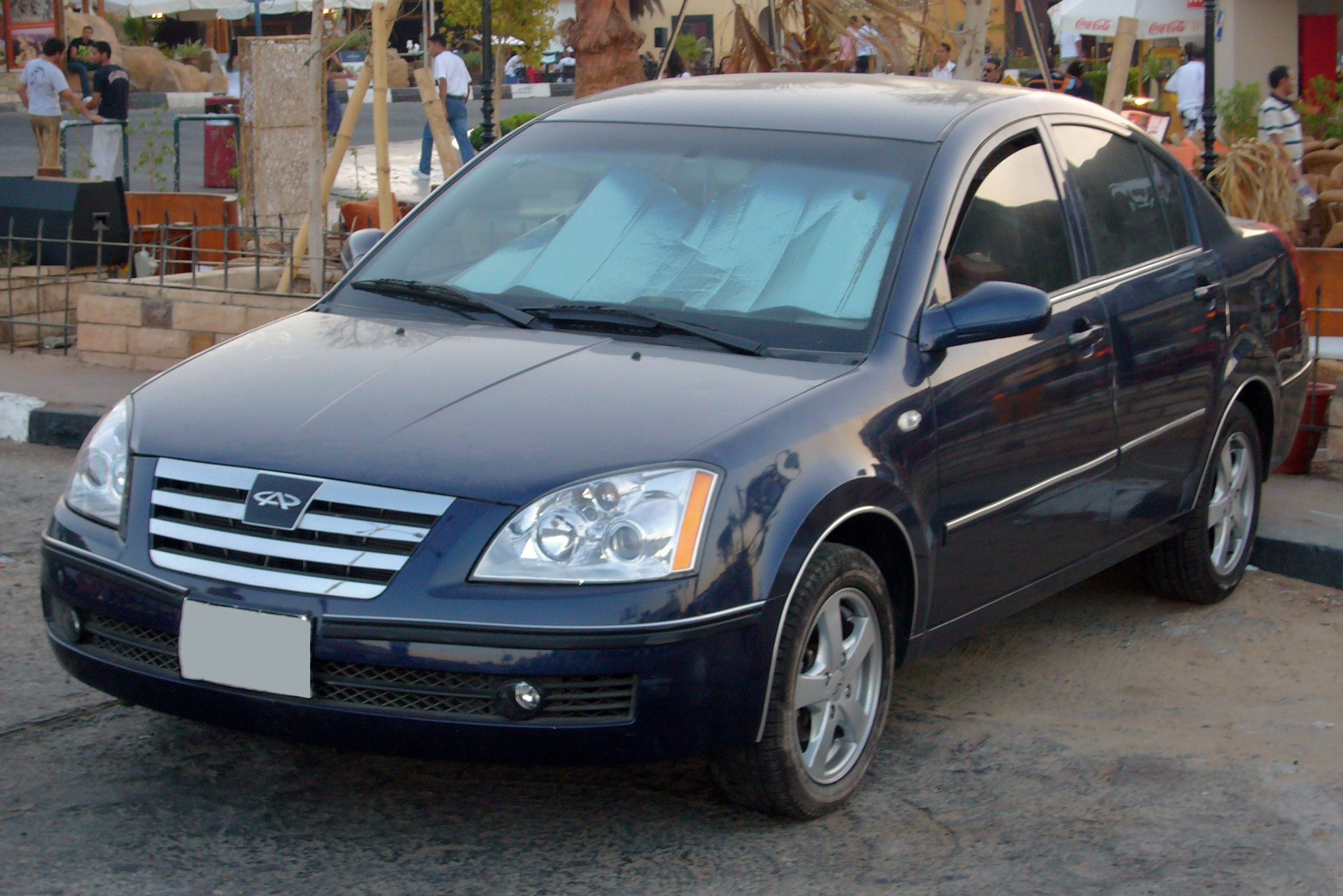
Speranza A516

=== Active ===
- Speranza (1998–present)

=== Former ===
- Nasr (1960–2008)

== Estonia ==
- Nobe

== Ethiopia ==
=== Former ===
- Holland Car (2005–2013)

== Finland ==
- Elcat
- Electric Raceabout (prototype, not in production)
- Korvensuu (1912–1913)
- Sisu Auto
- Toroidion (2015–2022)
- Valmet Automotive
- Vanaja (1943–1968)
- Valtra

== France ==
=== Active ===
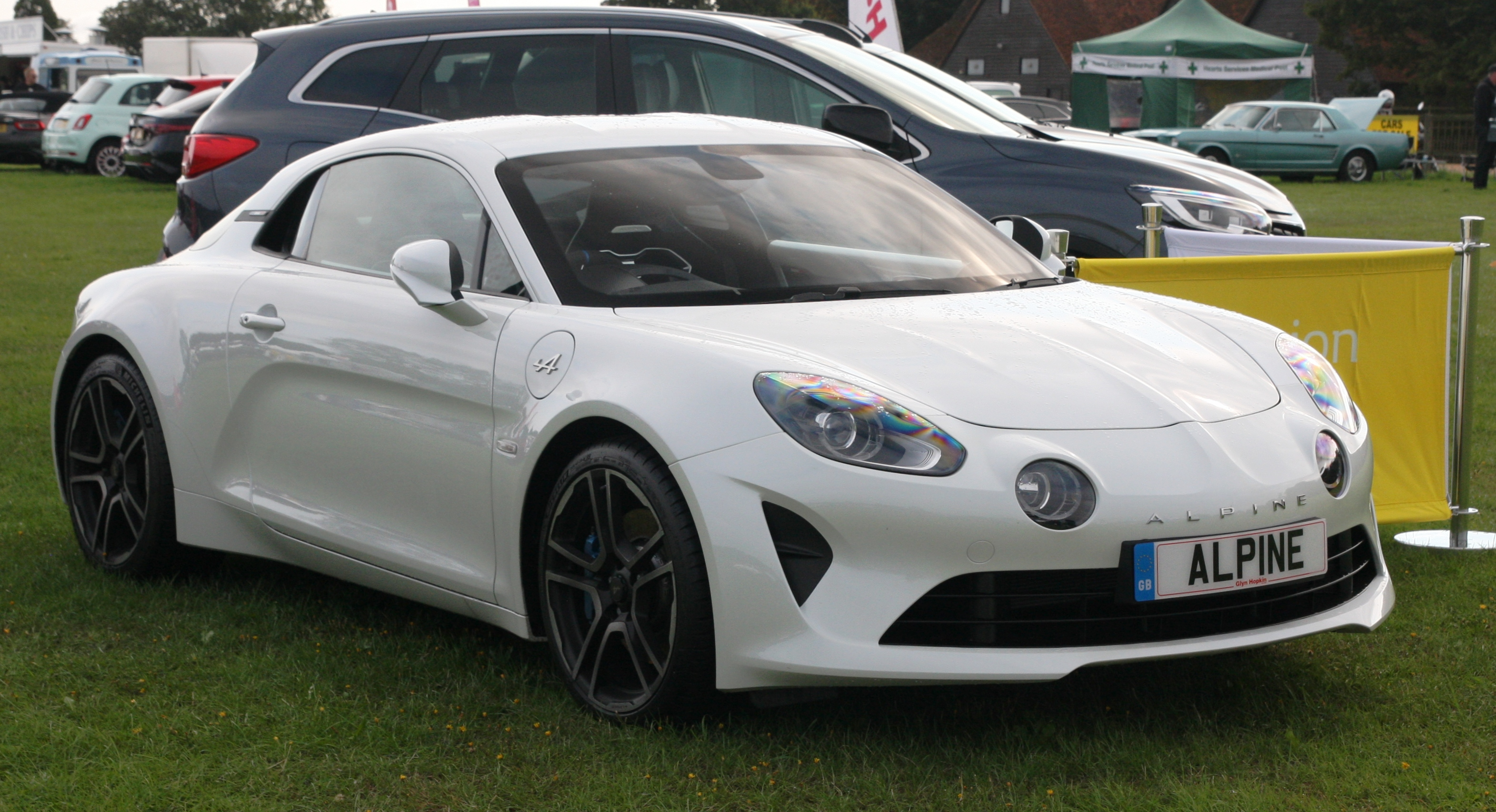
Alpine A110

Bugatti Divo

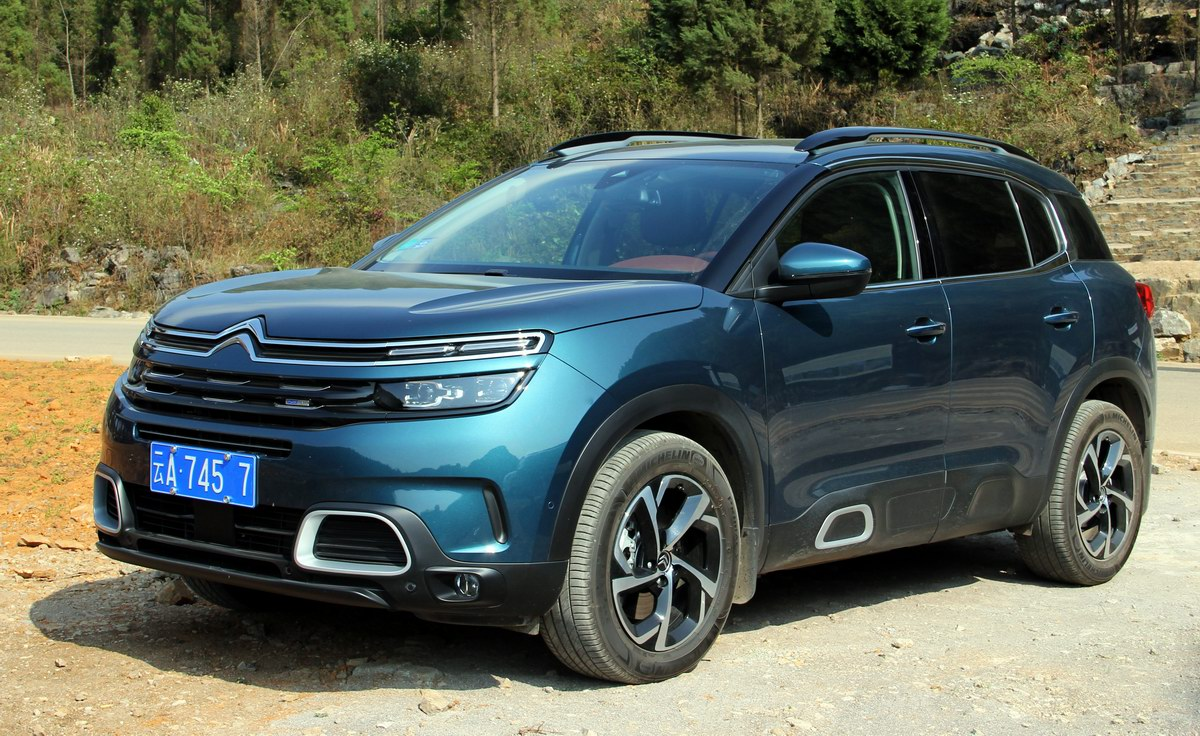
Citroën C5 Aircross

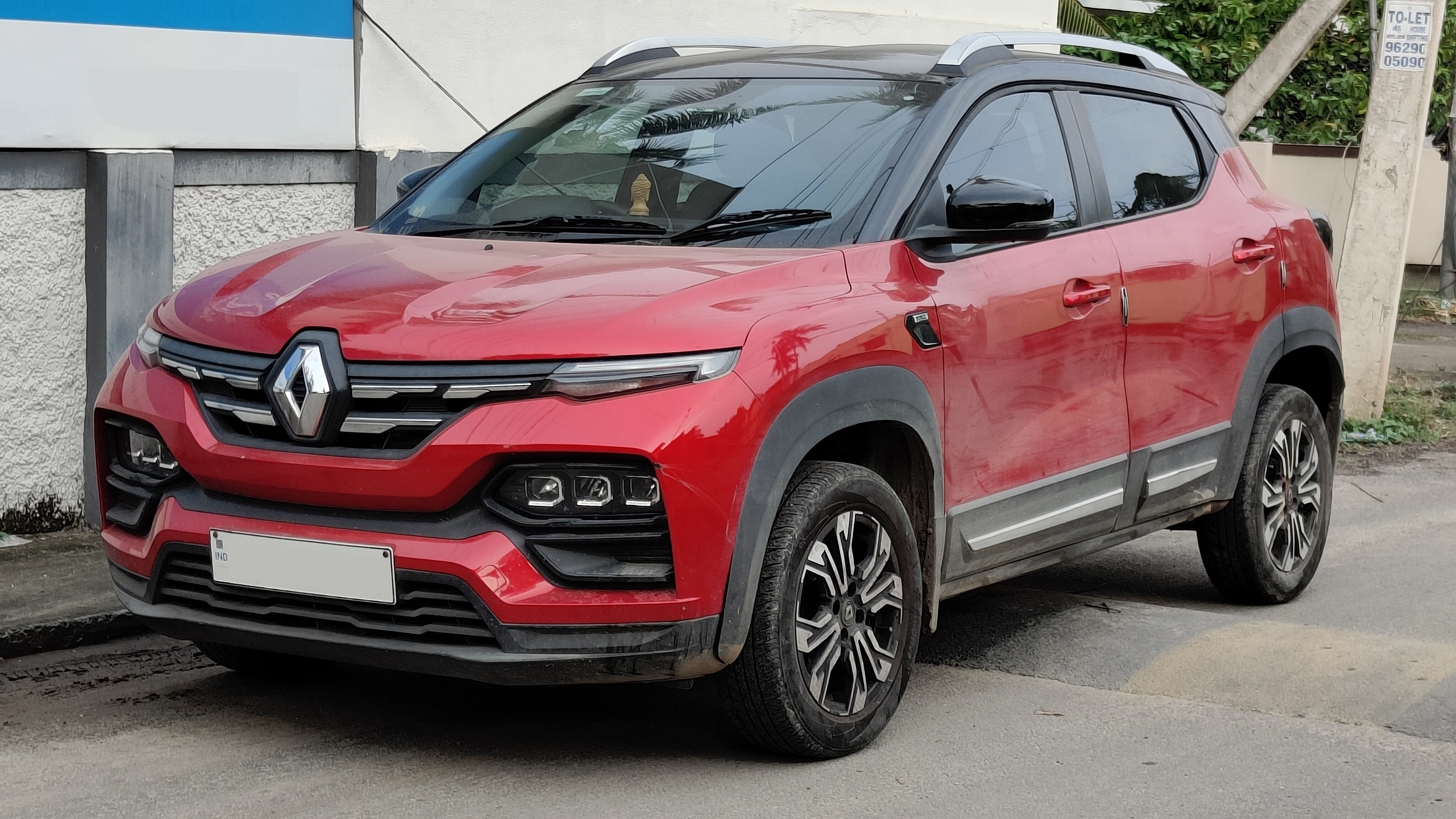
Renault Kiger

- Aixam
- Alpine (1955–present)
- Bolloré
- Bugatti (1909–present)
- Chatenet
- Citroën (1919–present)
- Delage (1905–present)
- De la Chapelle
- DS
- Ligier
- Microcar
- Peugeot (1896–present)
- PGO
- Renault (1899–present)
- Renault Trucks

=== Former ===
- Amilcar (1921–1939)
- Ballot (1905–1932)
- Berliet (1899–1978)
- Chenard-Walcker (1899–1946)
- Darracq (1897–1902)
- DB (1938–1961)
- De Dion-Bouton (1883–1932)
- Delahaye (1894–1954)
- Facel Vega (1939–1964)
- Gobron-Brillié (1898–1930)
- Hotchkiss (1903–1955)
- Lorraine-Dietrich (1836–1945)
- Mathis (1910–1950)
- Matra (1964–2003)
- Panhard (1887–2012)
- Panhard et Levassor (1887–1940)
- Rosengart (1927–1955)
- Salmson (1920–1957)
- Saviem (1955–1978)
- Simca (1934–1979)
- Talbot (1916–1959)
- Talbot-Lago (1935–1959)
- Tracta (1926–1934)
- VELAM (1955–1959)
- Vespa
- Voisin (1919–1939)

== Germany ==
Audi Q7

BMW X5

Mercedes-Benz GLS

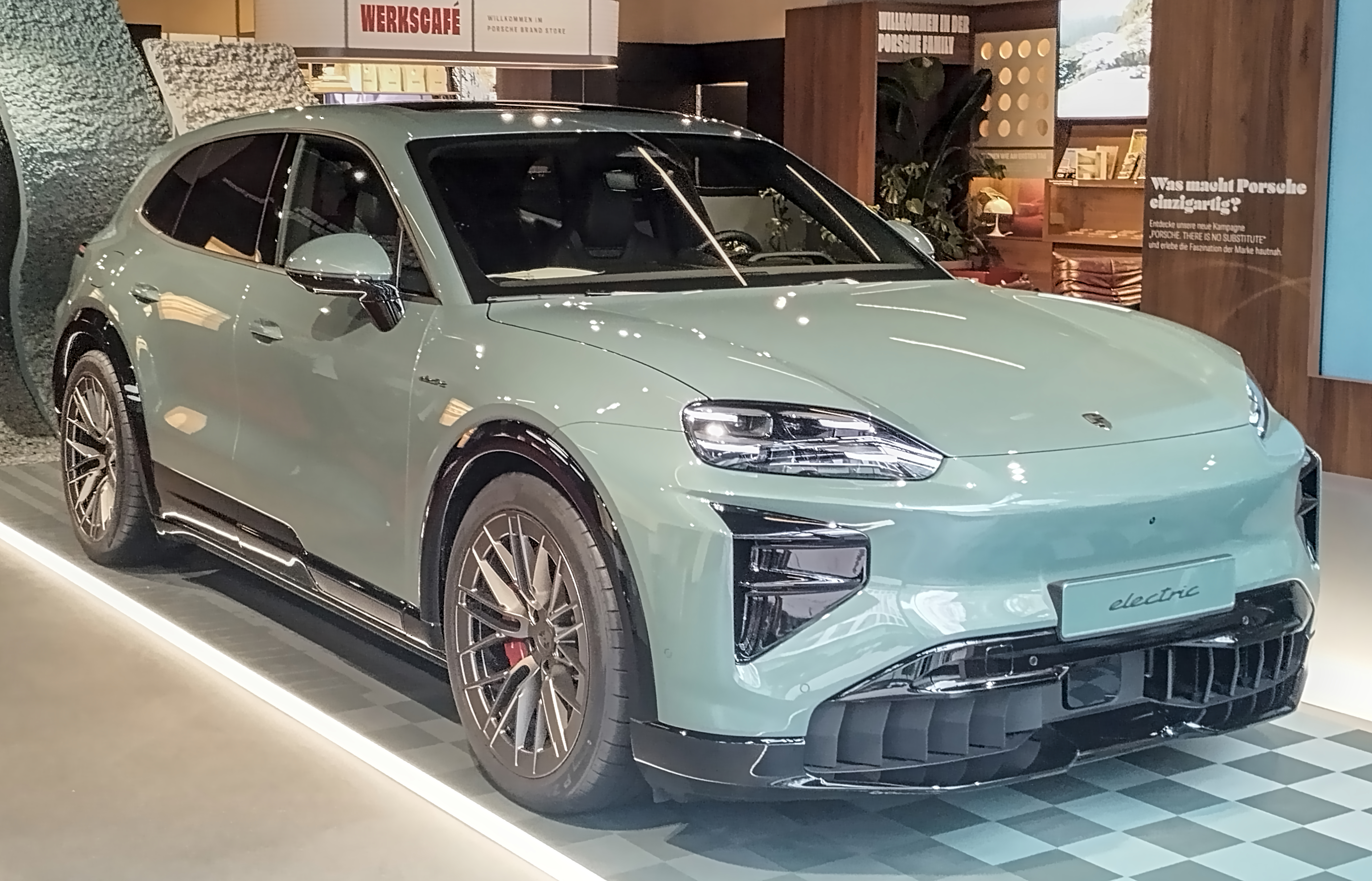
Porsche Cayenne Electric Turbo

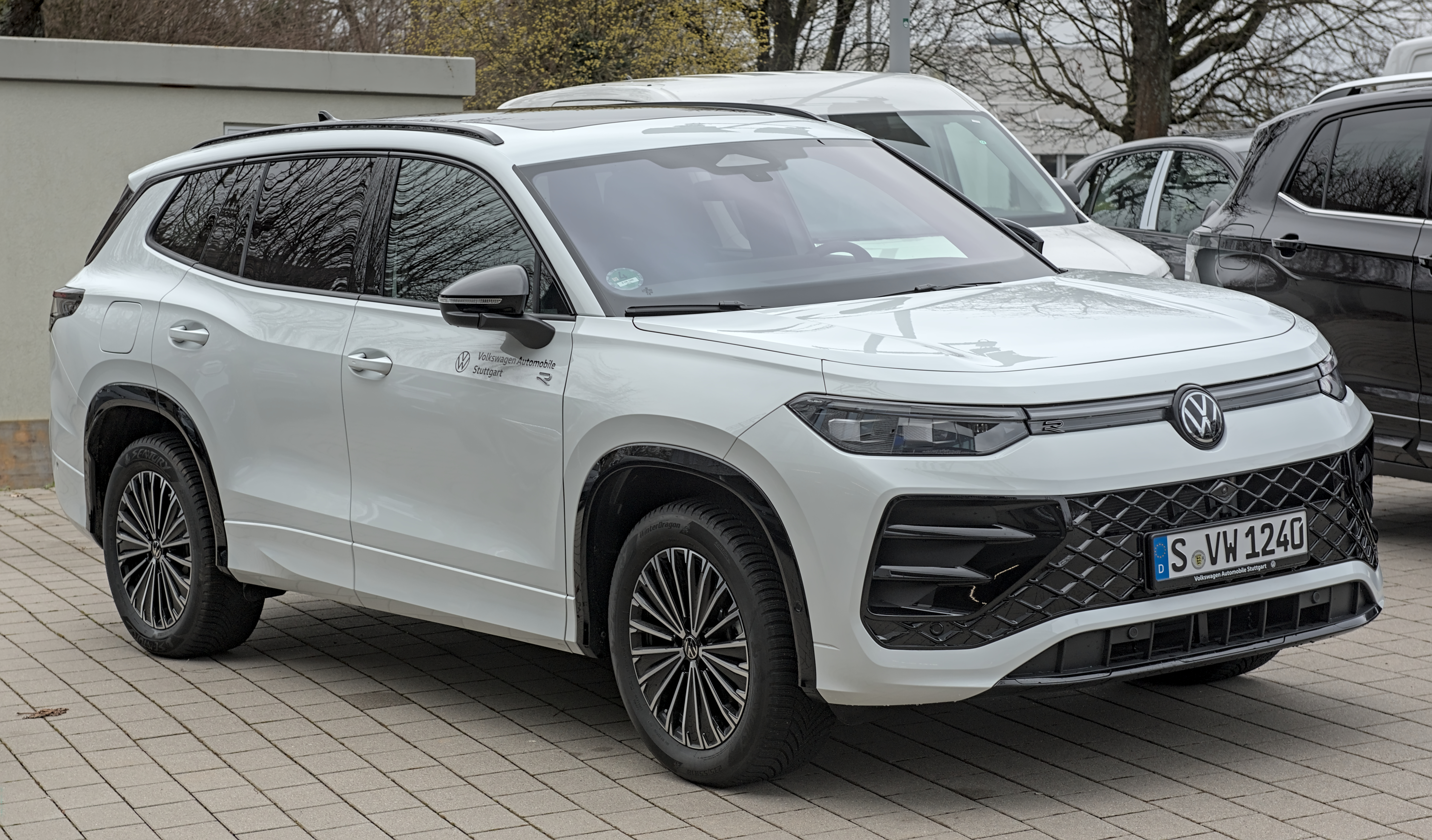
Volkswagen Tayron

=== Active ===
- 9ff
- ABT Sportsline
- Audi (1909–present)
- Alpina
- AMG (1967–present)
- Artega
- BMW (1926–present)
- BMW M
- Brabus
- CityEl
- Ford-Werke
- Gemballa (1985–2018)
- Isdera
- Lotec
- Magirus
- MAN
- Maybach
- Melkus
- Mercedes-Benz (1886–present)
- Opel (1899–present)
- Porsche (1929–present)
- Ruf (1979–present)
- Smart (1994–present)
- TechArt (1987–present)
- Volkswagen (1937–present)
- Wiesmann

=== Former ===
- Amphicar (1960–1968)
- Apal
- Auto Union (1932–1969)
- Bitter
- Borgward
- DKW
- Gatter (1952–1958) (formerly Czechoslovakia 1926–1937)
- Glas (1883–1966)
- Goliath (1928–1961)
- Hansa (1905–1931)
- Heinkel (1956–1958)
- Horch (1904–1932)
- Lloyd (1908–1963)
- Maybach (1909–2013)
- Mercedes (1900–1926)
- Messerschmitt (1953–1964)
- NSU (1873–1969)
- Trabant (1957–1991)
- VW-Porsche (1969–1976)
- Wanderer (1911–1941)
- Wartburg (1898–1991)

== Ghana ==
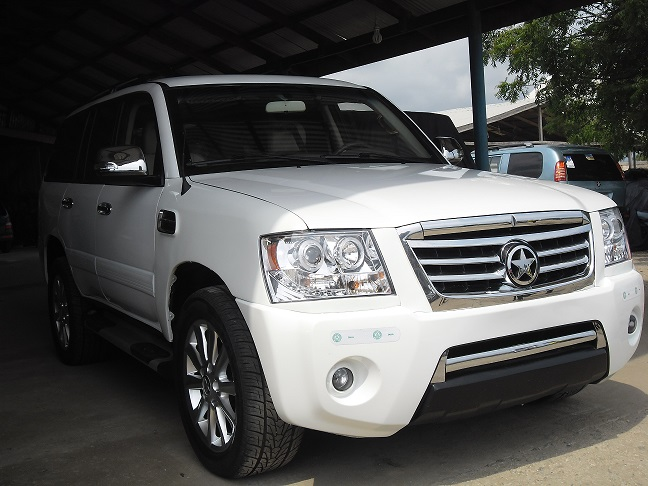
Kantanka Otumfo

- Kantanka

== Greece ==
=== Active ===
- ELVO (1973–present)
- Kioleides (1968–present)
- Keraboss (2011–present)
- Korres (2002–present)
- Namco (1973–present)
- Replicar Hellas (2007–present)

=== Former ===
- Alta (1968–1978)
- Attica (1958–1972)
- Autokinitoviomihania Ellados (1975–1984)
- Automeccanica (1980–1995)
- Balkania (1975–1995)
- BET (1965–1975)
- Biamax (1956–1986)
- C.AR (1970–1992)
- Candia (1965–1990)
- Diana (1976–1990)
- DIM (1977–1982)
- EBIAM (1979–1984)
- Hercules (1980–1983)
- MAVA-Renault (1979–1985)
- MEBEA (1960–1983)
- Neorion (1974–1975)
- Pan-Car (1968–1994)
- Record (1957–1999)
- Scavas (1973–1992)
- Styl Kar (1970)
- Tangalakis (1935–1939)
- Theologou (1915–1926)

== Hungary ==
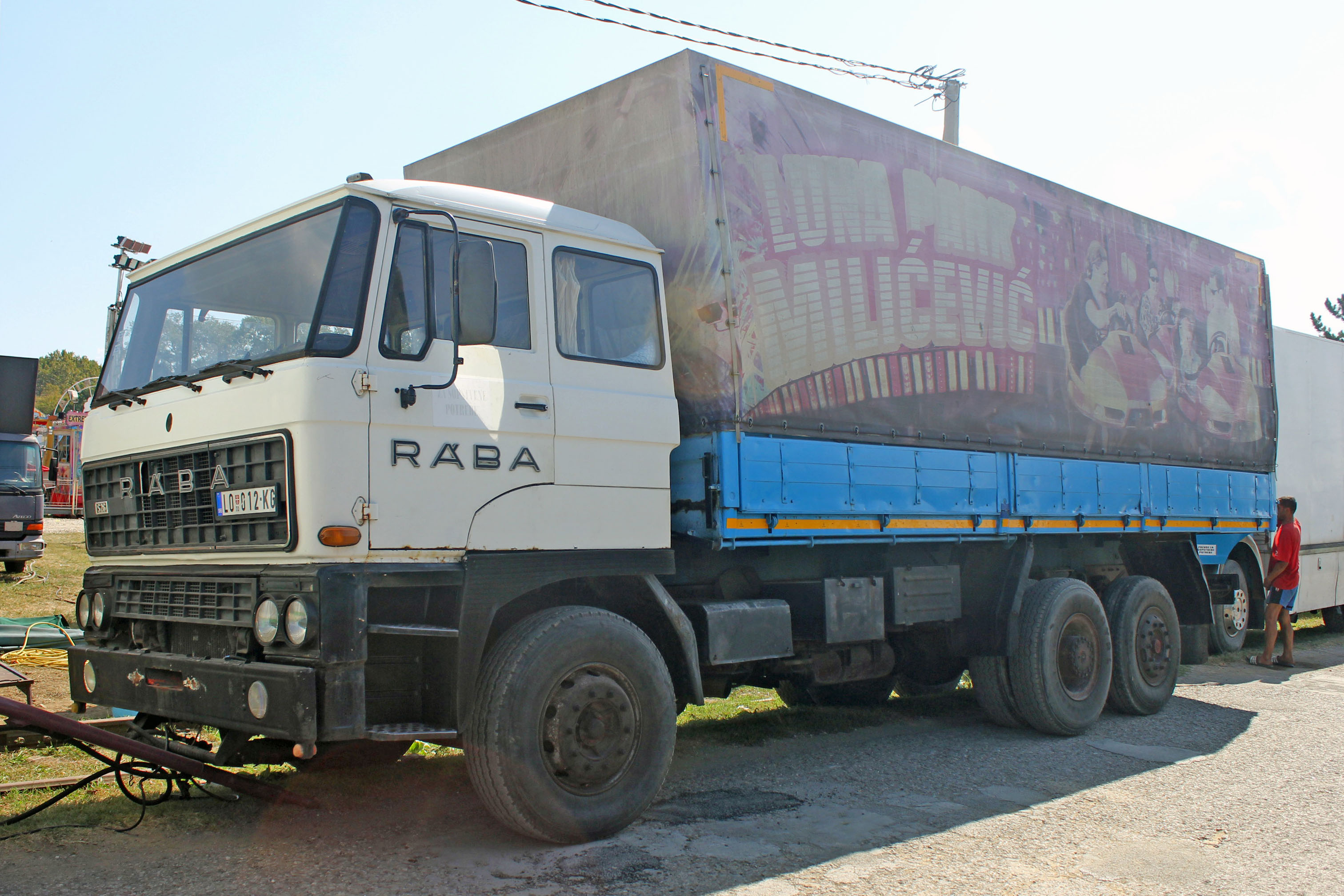
RÁBA truck with DAF cabin

=== Active ===
- Credo
- Rába

=== Former ===
- Csepel
- Csonka
- Fejes
- Ikarus
- MÁG

== India ==
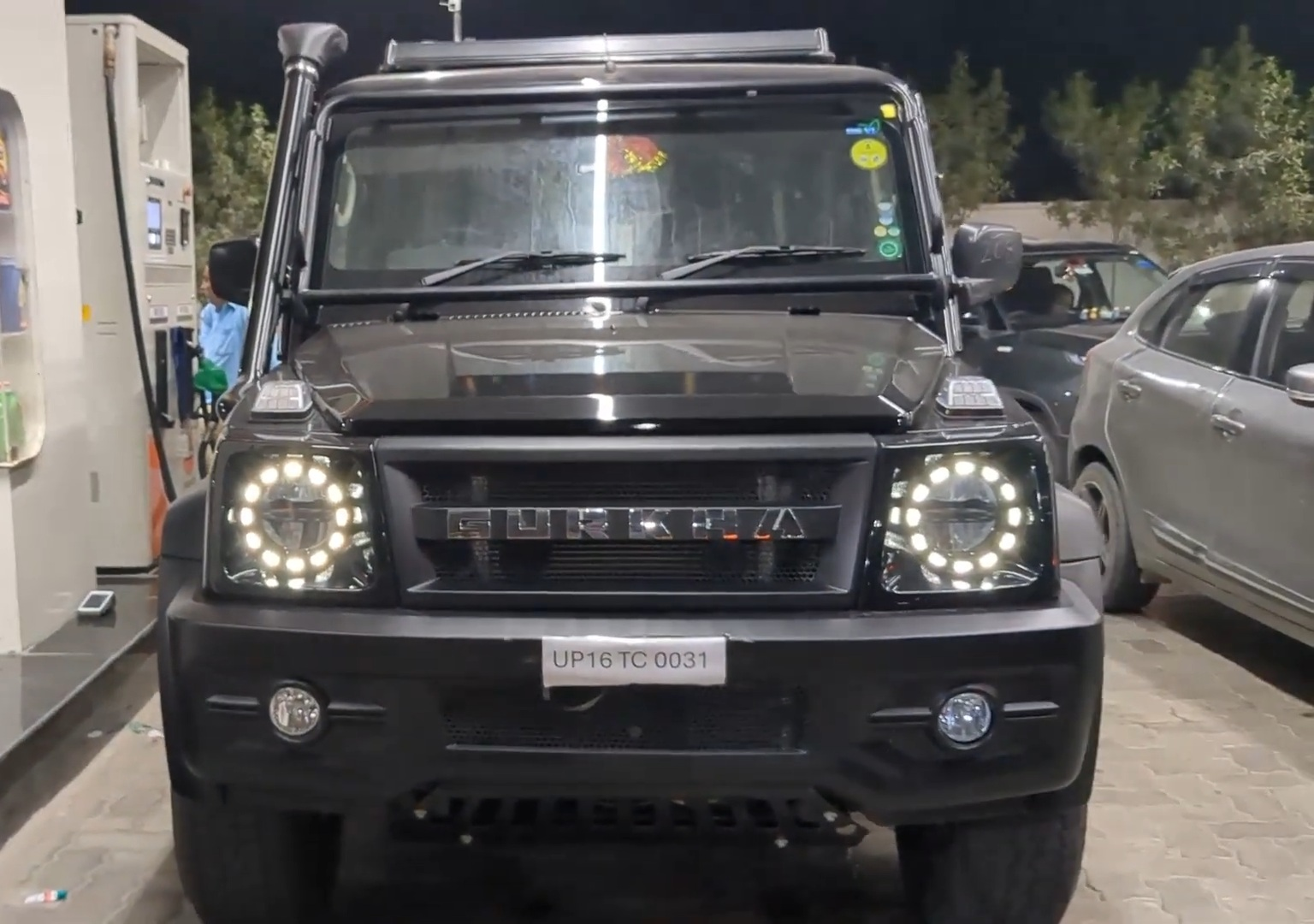
Force Gurkha

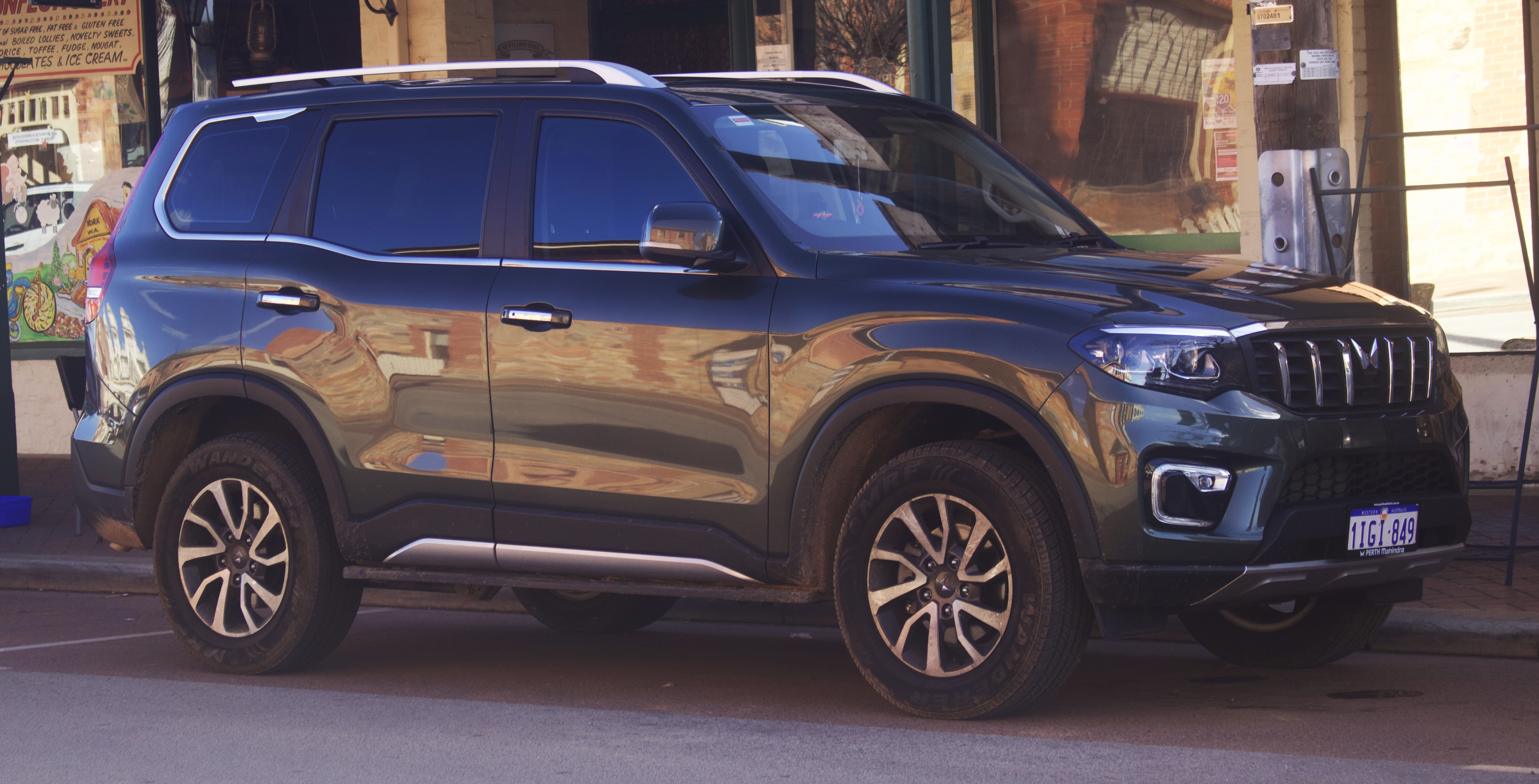
Mahindra Scorpio-N

Tata Safari

=== Active ===
- Ashok Leyland
- Avinya
- Bajaj Auto
- Eicher Motors
- Force Motors
- Mahindra & Mahindra
- Maruti Suzuki
- Tata Motors

=== Former ===
- Chinkara Motors (2003–2016)
- Hindustan Motors (1963–2014)
- ICML (2012–2018)
- Maruti (1983–2007)
- Premier (1947–2016)
- Reva
- Sipani Motors (Sunrise Auto Industries) (1973–1995)
- Standard (1949–1988)

== Indonesia ==
=== Current ===
- Esemka
- Pindad

=== Defunct ===
- Timor

== Iran ==
- Bahman
- Diar
- Iran Khodro (1962–present)
- Khodro Kaveer
- Kish Khodro
- Morattab
- MVM
- Pars Khodro (1967–present)
- Paykan
- SAIPA (1966–present)
- Shahab Khodro
- Zagross Khodro

== Ireland ==
- Shamrock
- TMC Costin
- Alesbury (1907–1908)
- GAC Ireland (1980–1986)

== Israel ==
=== Active ===
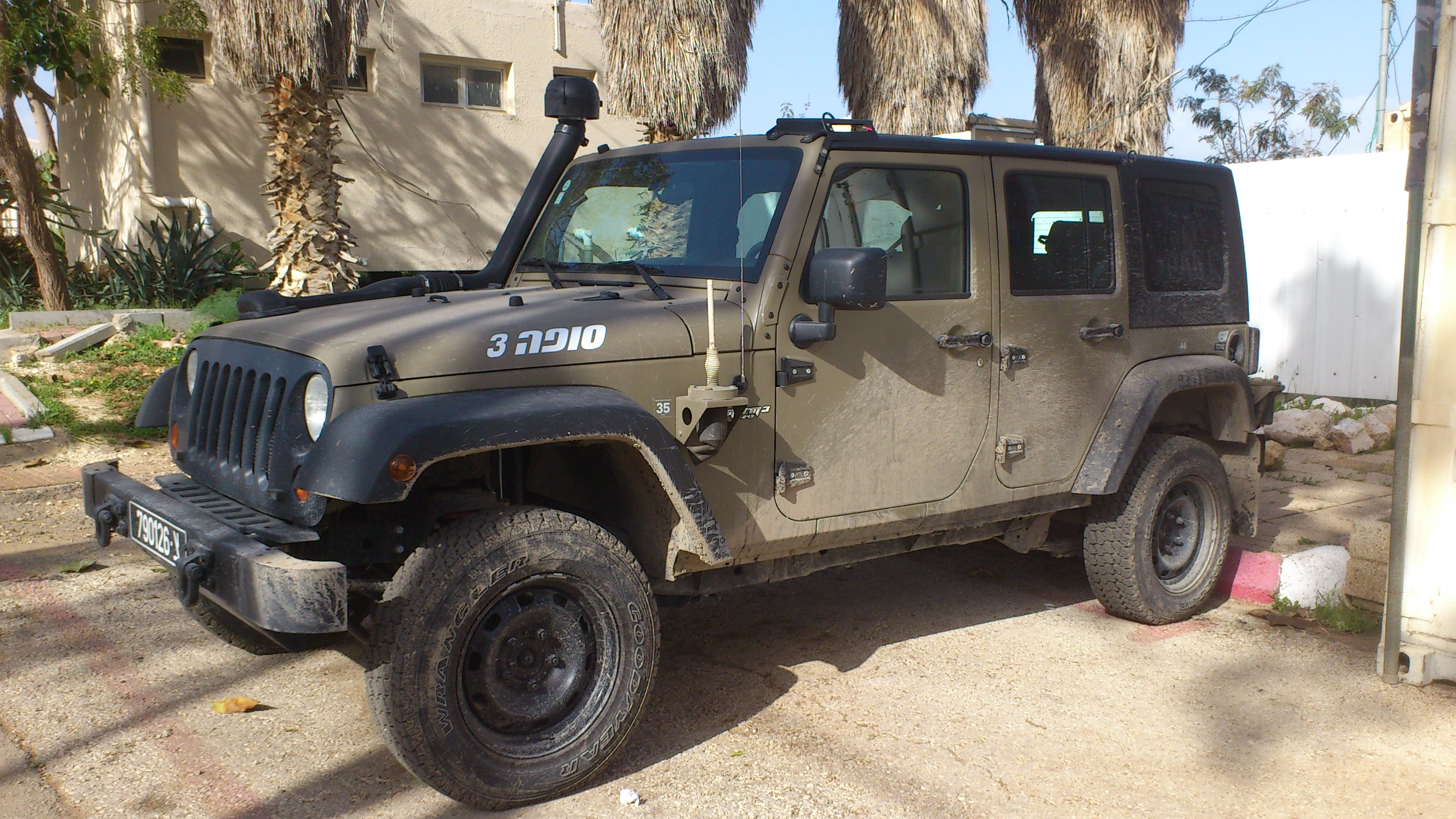
AIL Storm

- AIL

== Italy ==
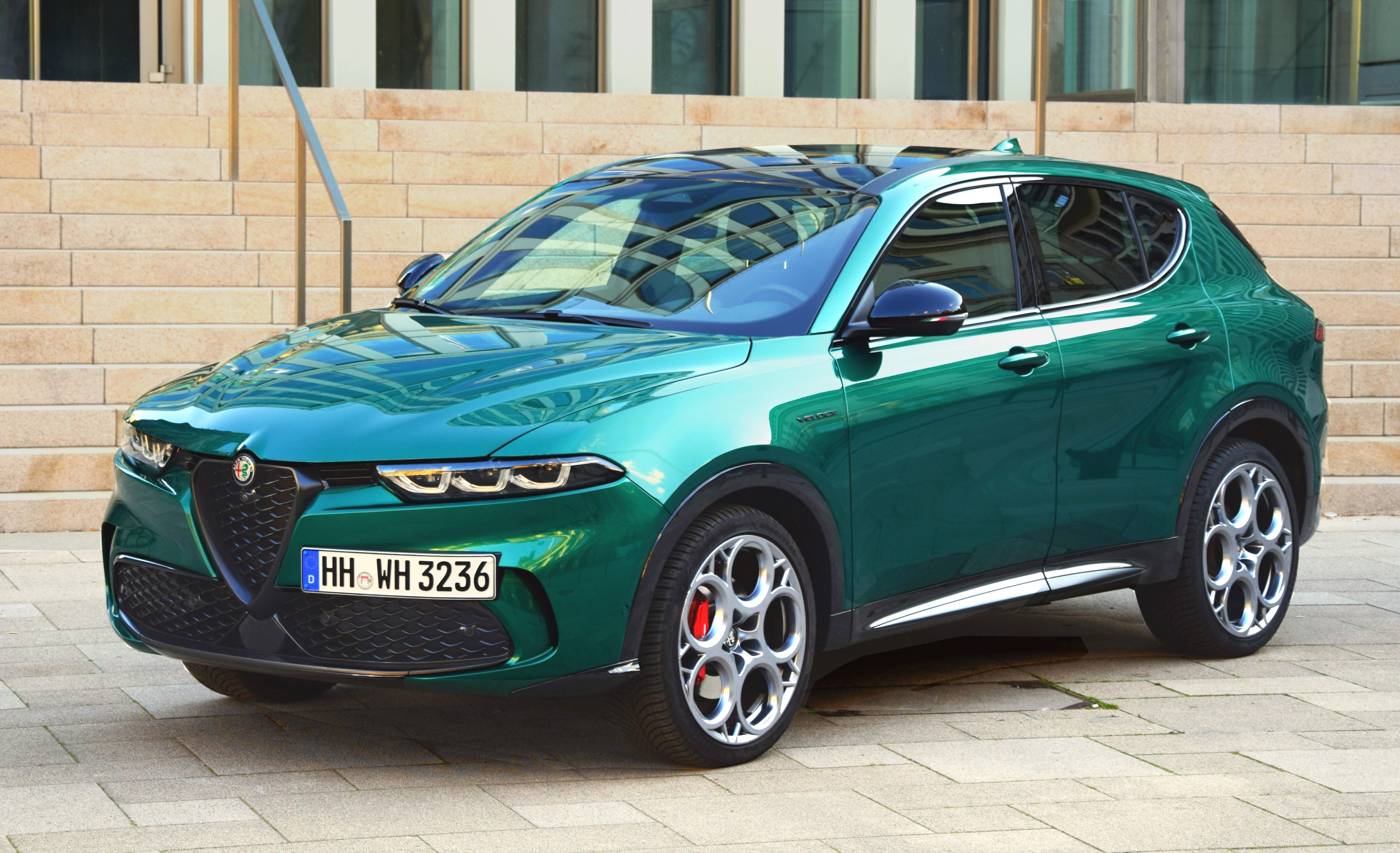
Alfa Romeo Tonale

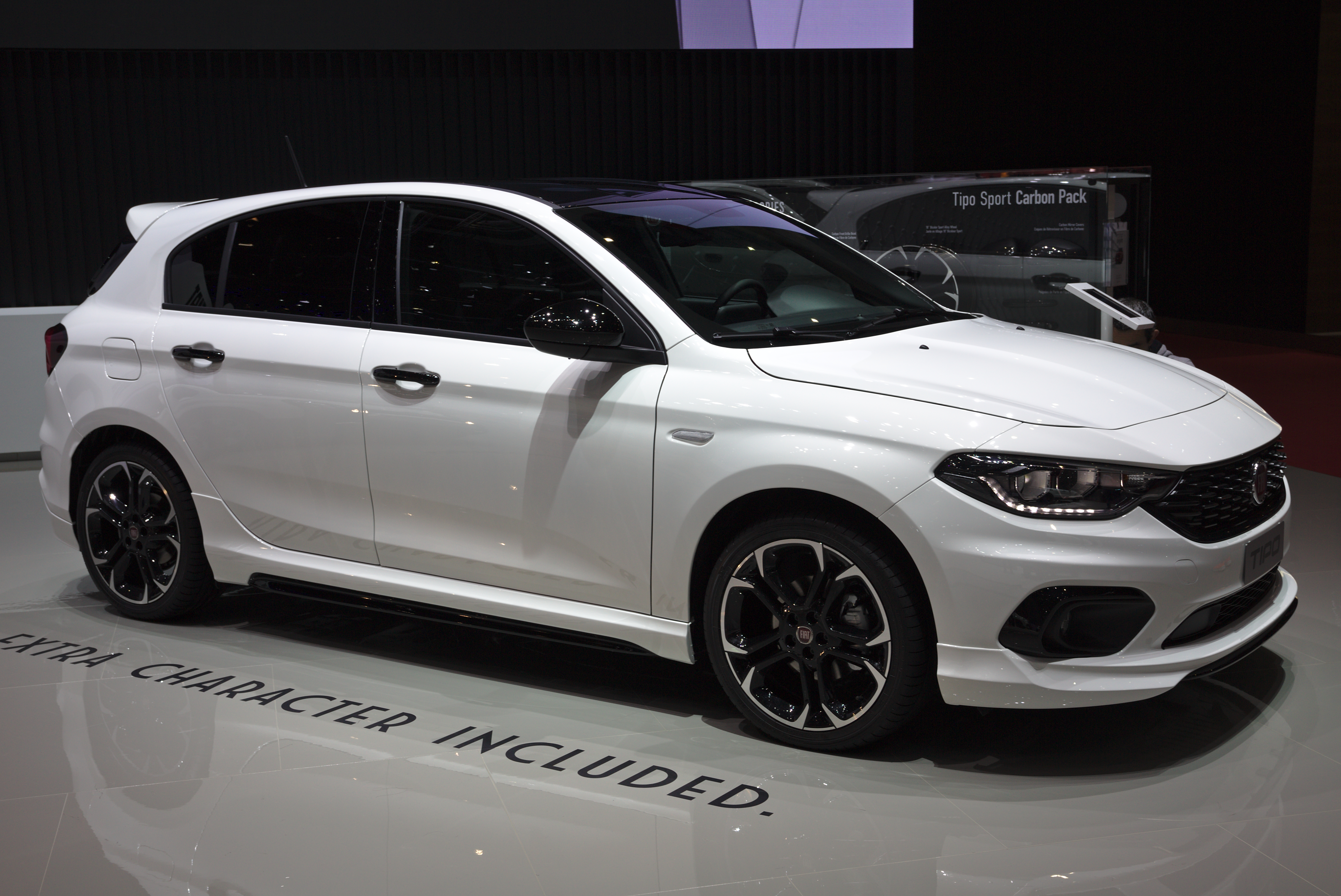
Fiat Tipo (2015)

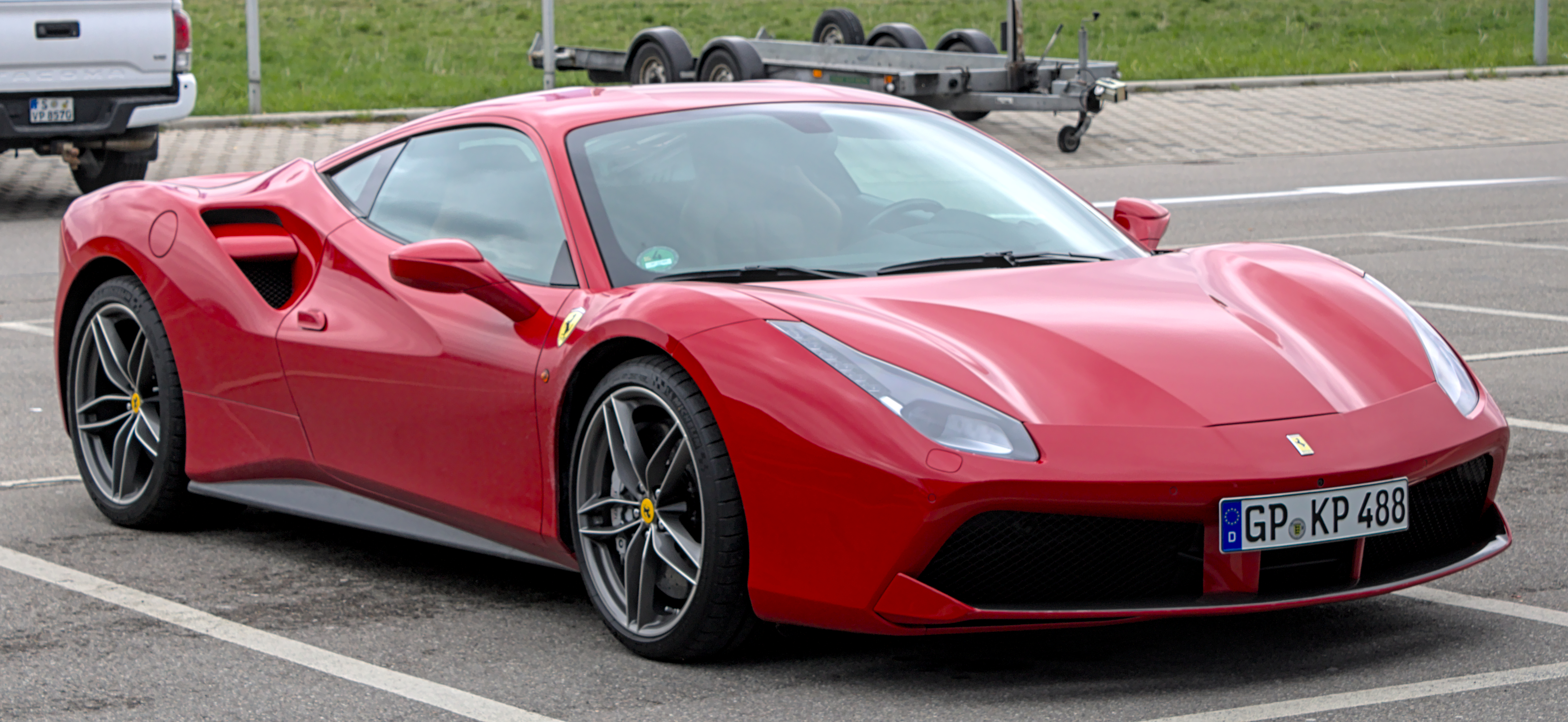
Ferrari 488

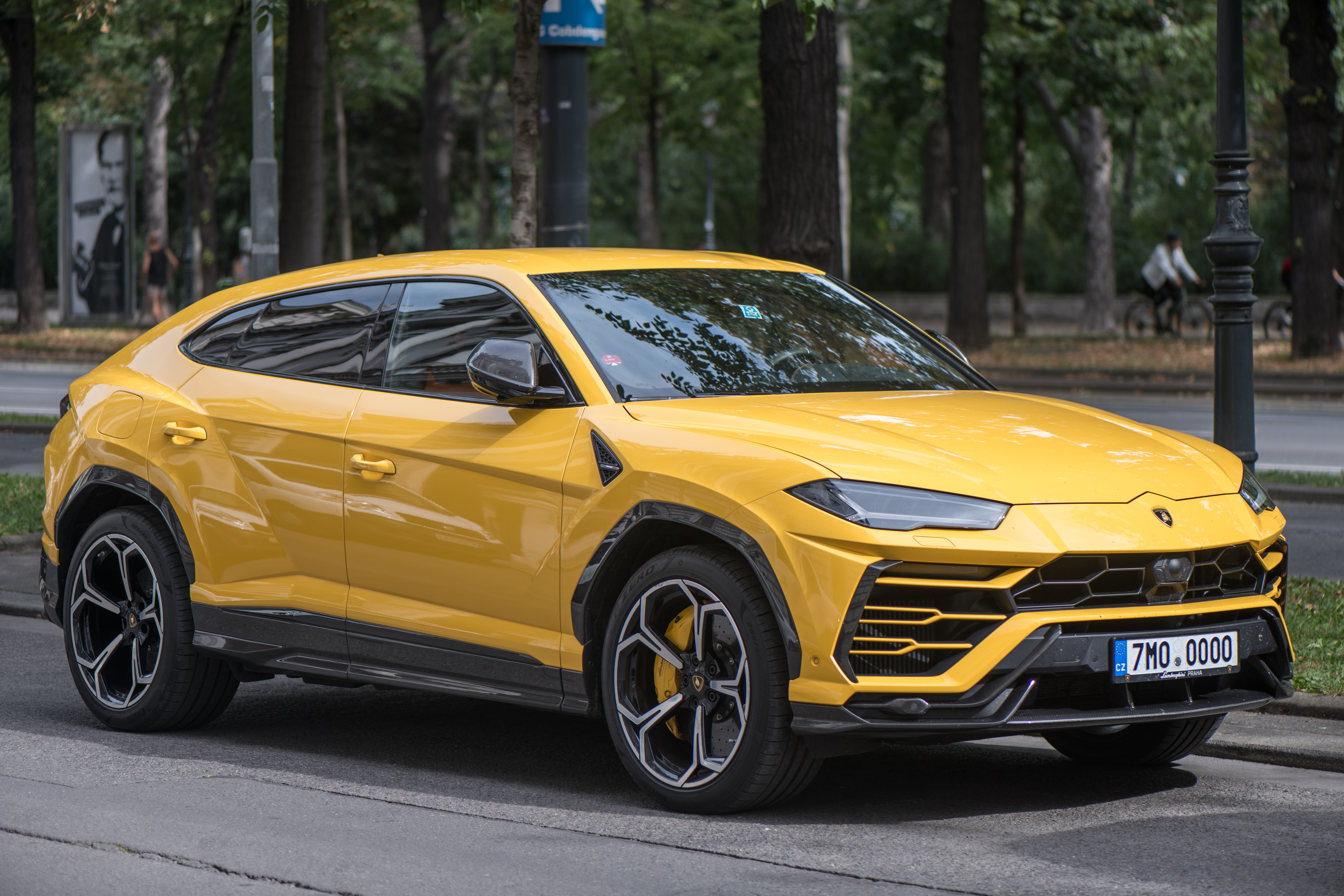
Lamborghini Urus

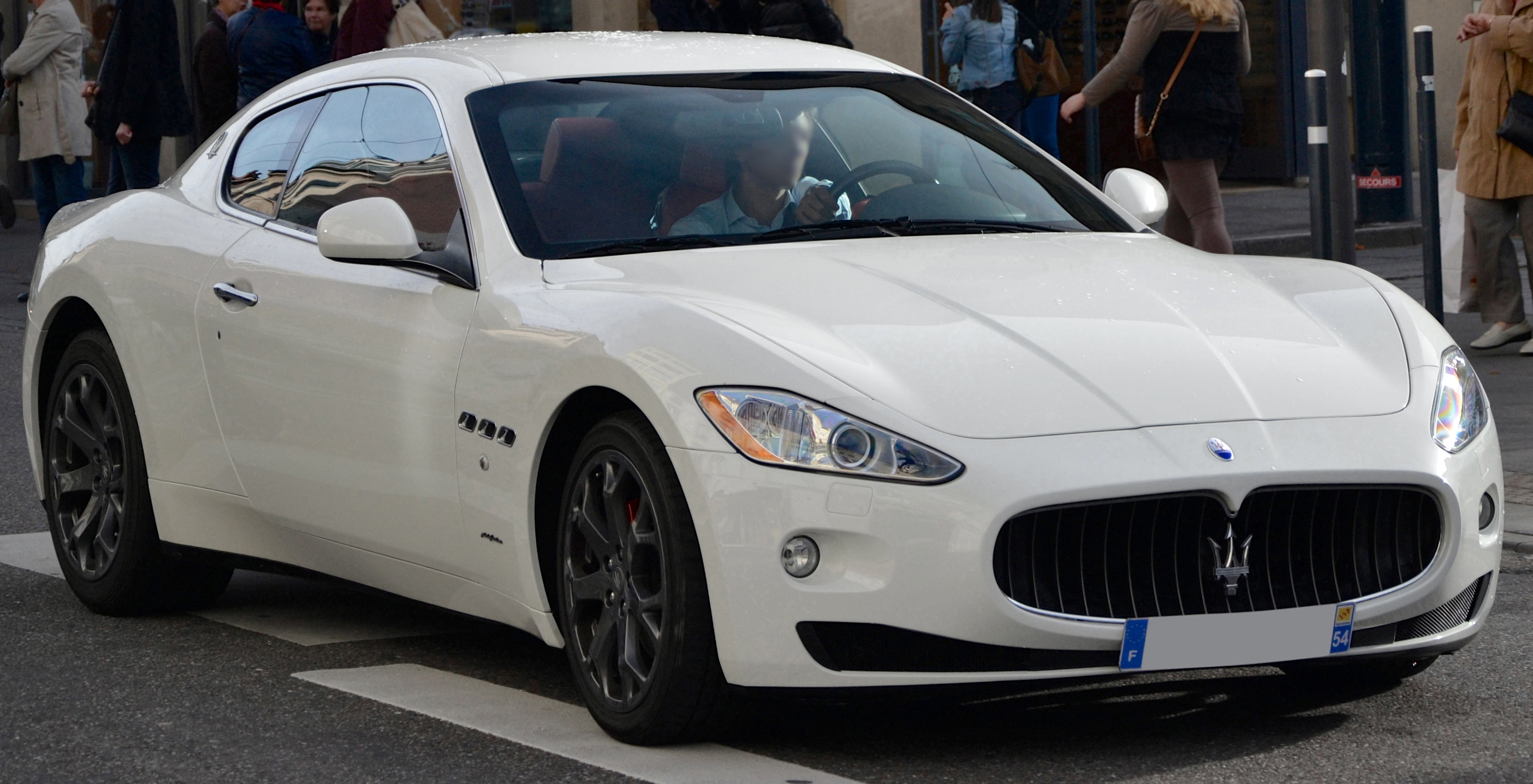
Maserati GranTurismo

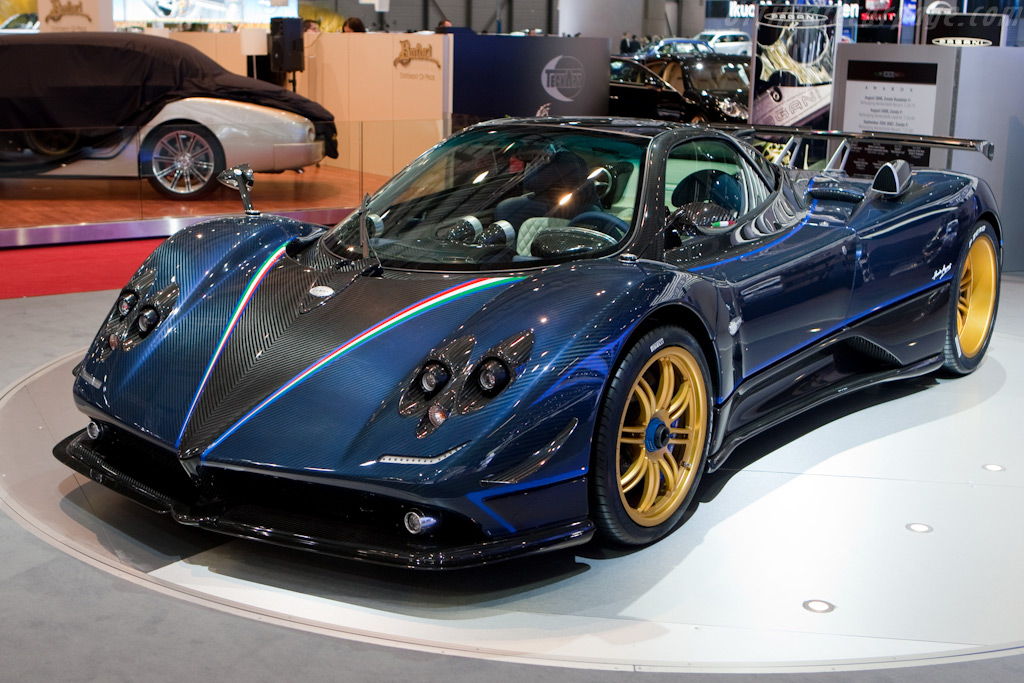
Pagani Zonda

=== Active ===
- Abarth (1949–present)
- Alfa Romeo (1910–present)
- Casalini (1939–present)
- Cizeta (1988–2003)
- De Tomaso (1959–present)
- DR (2007–present).
- Fiat (1899–present)
- Ferrari (1947–present)
- F&M (2002–2009)
- Giannini
- Giottiline
- Grecav (1964–2012)
- Italdesign (1968–present)
- Iveco (1975–present)
- Lamborghini (1963–present)
- Lancia (1906–present)
- Maserati (1926–present)
- Mazzanti (2010–present)
- Pagani (1998–present)
- Piaggio (1943–present)
- Pininfarina
- Qvale (2000–2002)
- Spada Vetture Sport (2007–2011)

=== Former ===
- Auto Avio Costruzioni (1939)
- ASA (1961–1969)
- Autobianchi (1955–1995)
- Bertone (1982–1989)
- Bizzarrini (1964–1969)
- Cisitalia (1946–1963)
- Covini (1978–2016)
- Innocenti (1920–1996)
- Intermeccanica (moved to Canada)
- Iso (1953–1974)
- O.S.C.A. (1947–1967)
- Siata (1926–1970)

== Ivory Coast ==
- Baby-Brousse (1964–1979)

(Made by Citroën in Ivory Coast)

== Japan ==
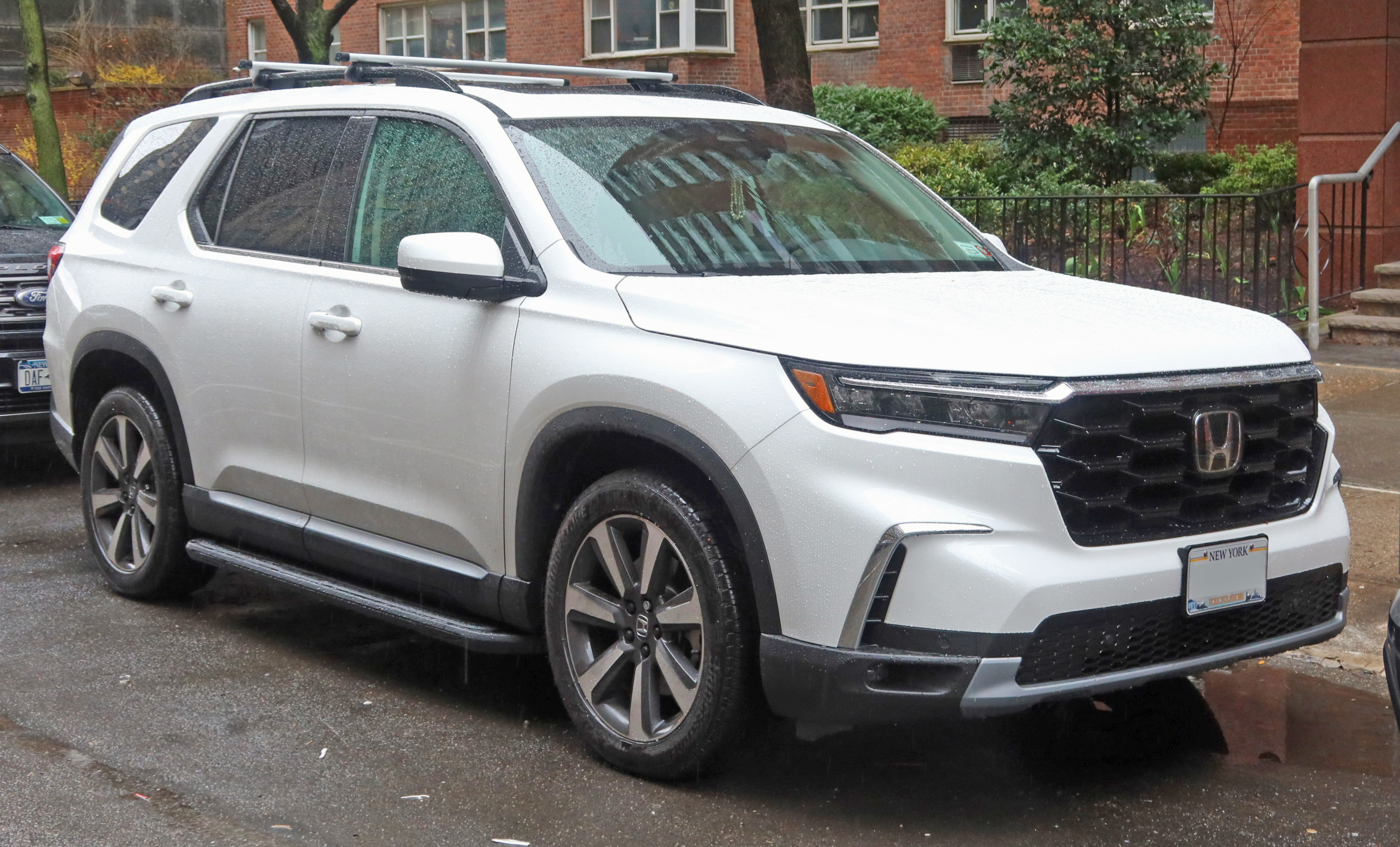
Honda Pilot

Mitsubishi Pajero

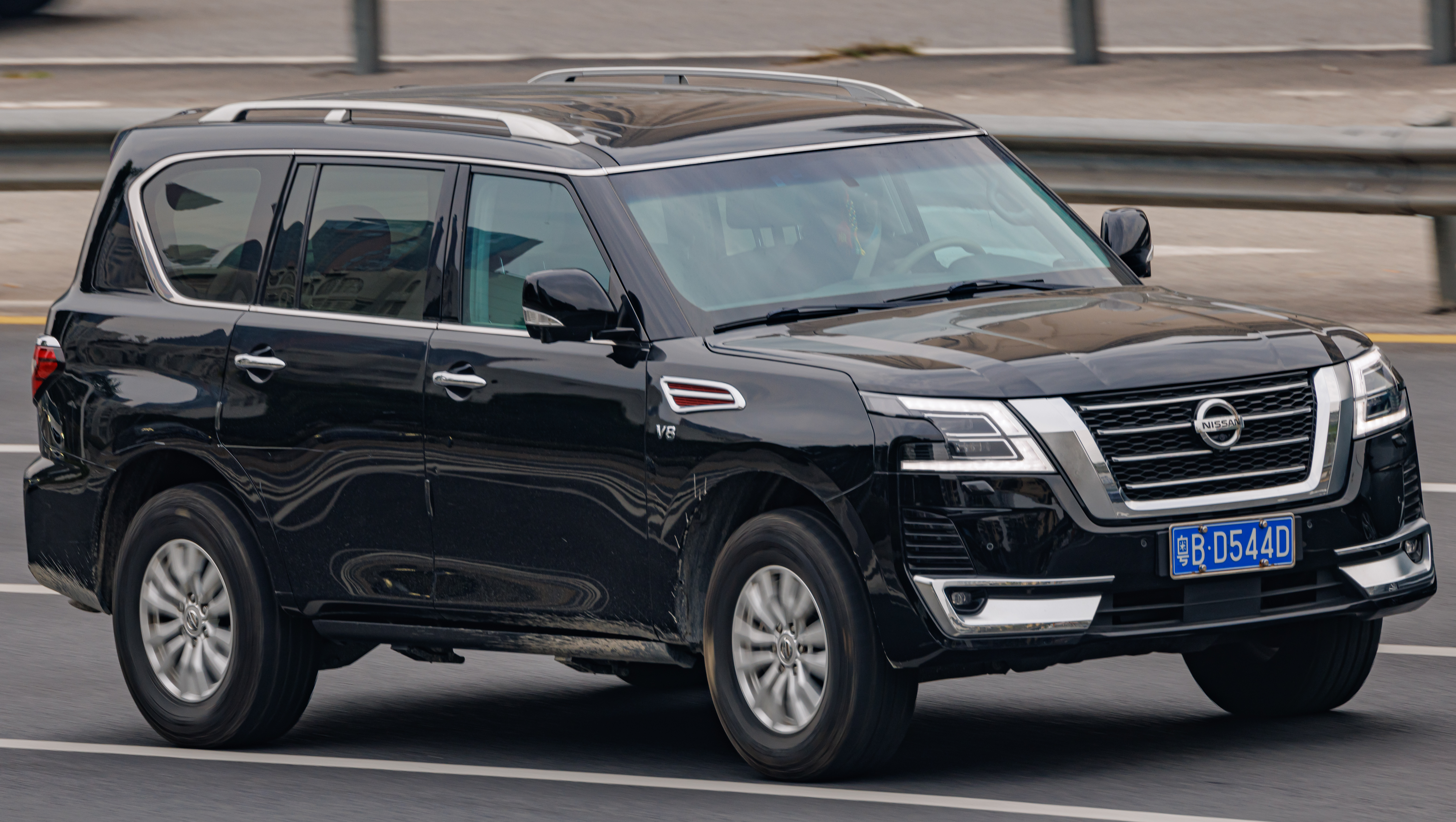
Nissan Patrol

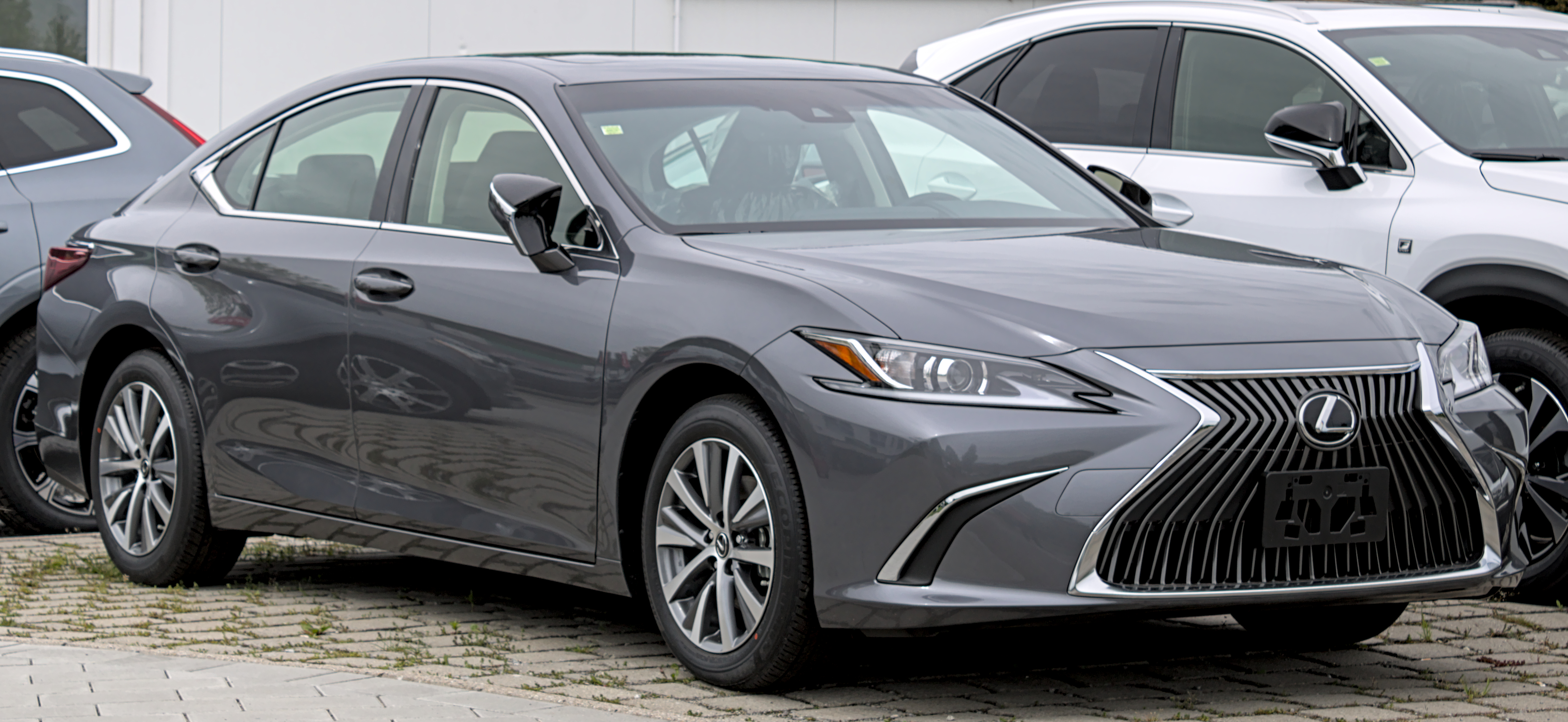
Lexus ES

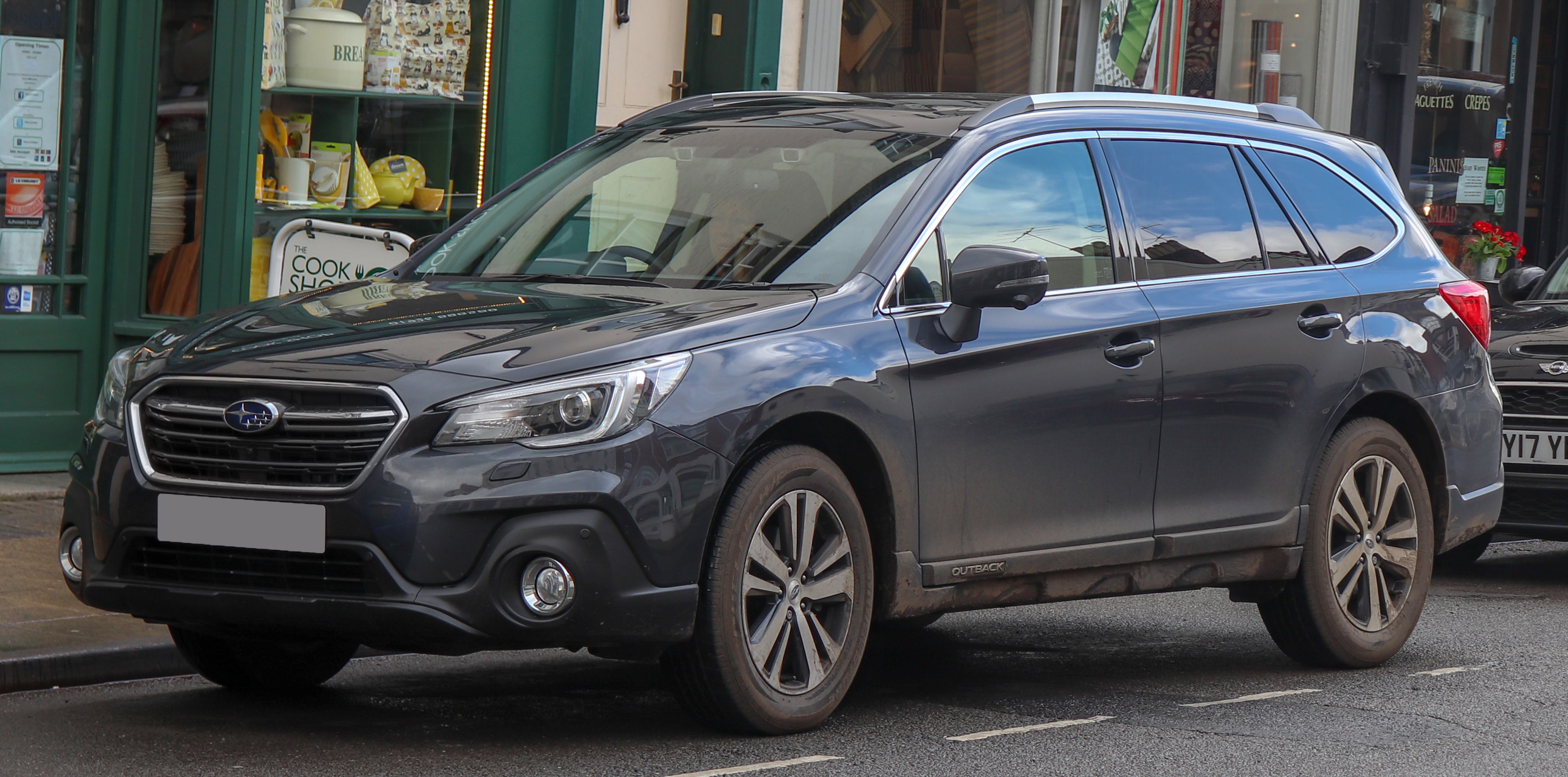
Subaru Outback

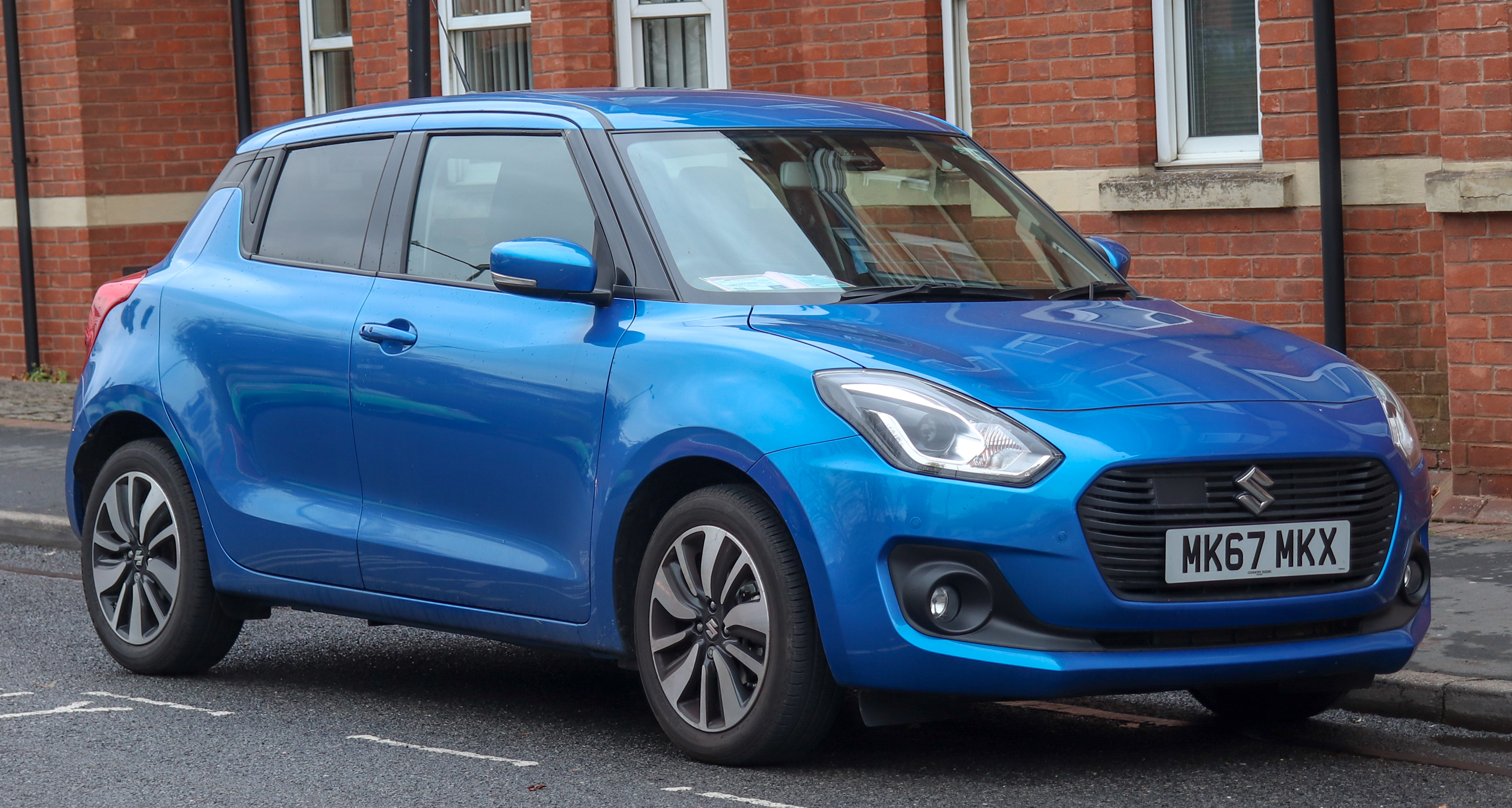
Suzuki Swift

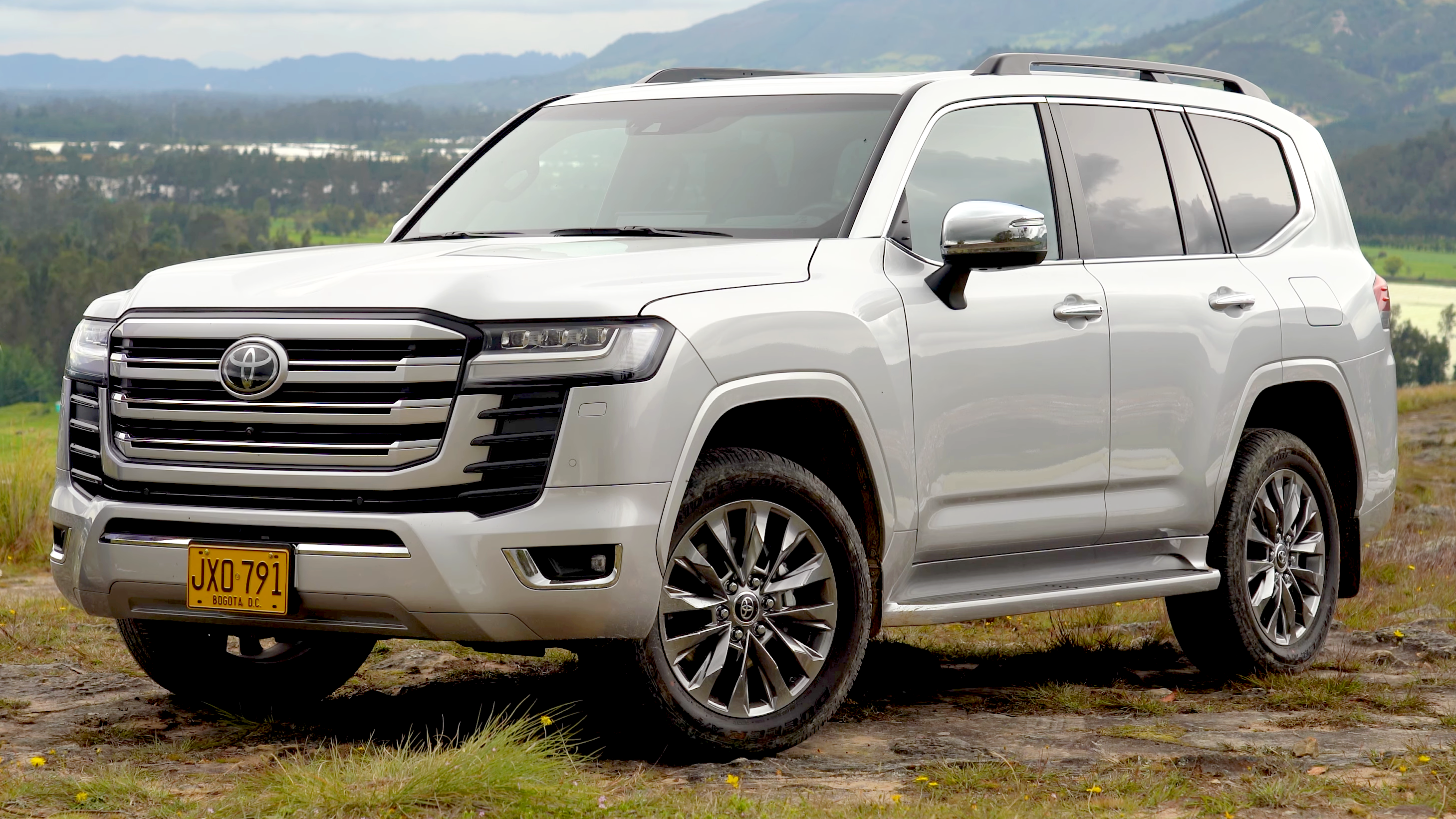
Toyota Land Cruiser

=== Active ===
- Toyota (1935–present)
  - Lexus (1989–present)
  - GR (2019–present)
  - Century (2025–present)
- Nissan (1933–present)
  - GT-R (2000–present)
  - Nismo (1983–present)
  - Infiniti (1989–present)
  - Renault–Nissan–Mitsubishi Alliance (1999–present)
- Honda (1951–present)
  - Acura (1986–present)
  - Afeela (2022–present)
- Mitsubishi (1917–present)
  - NMKV (2011–present)
- Subaru (1953–present)
  - STI (1988–present)
- Mazda (1931–present)
- Suzuki (1909–present)
- Daihatsu (1907–present)
- Mitsuoka (1979–present)
- Takeoka Auto Craft (1982–present)
- Aspark (2017–present)
- Isuzu (1937–present) – Mainly truck manufacturing
- Hino Motors (1942–present) – Mainly truck manufacturing
- Mitsubishi Fuso (2003–present) – Mainly truck manufacturing
- UD Trucks (2007–present) – Mainly truck manufacturing
- J-Bus (2002–present) – Mainly bus manufacturing
- Yamaha Motor (1954–present) – Manufacture of SSV
- Kawasaki Motors (1954–present) – Manufacture of SSV

=== Former ===
- Amati Cars (1988–1992)
- Autozam (1989–1998)
- Colt (1974–1984) (cars produced and exported by Mitsubishi Motors and imported into the UK by the Colt Car Company and marketed under the Colt brand)
- Datsun (1931–1986) (2013–2022)
- ɛ̃fini (1991–1997)
- Eunos (1989–1996)
- Hino (1961–1967)
- Prince (1952–1966)
- Scion (2003–2016)
- Toyopet

== Kenya ==
- Mobius (2013–present)
- Nyayo (1986–1999)

== Liechtenstein ==
- Jehle
- Orca

== Madagascar ==
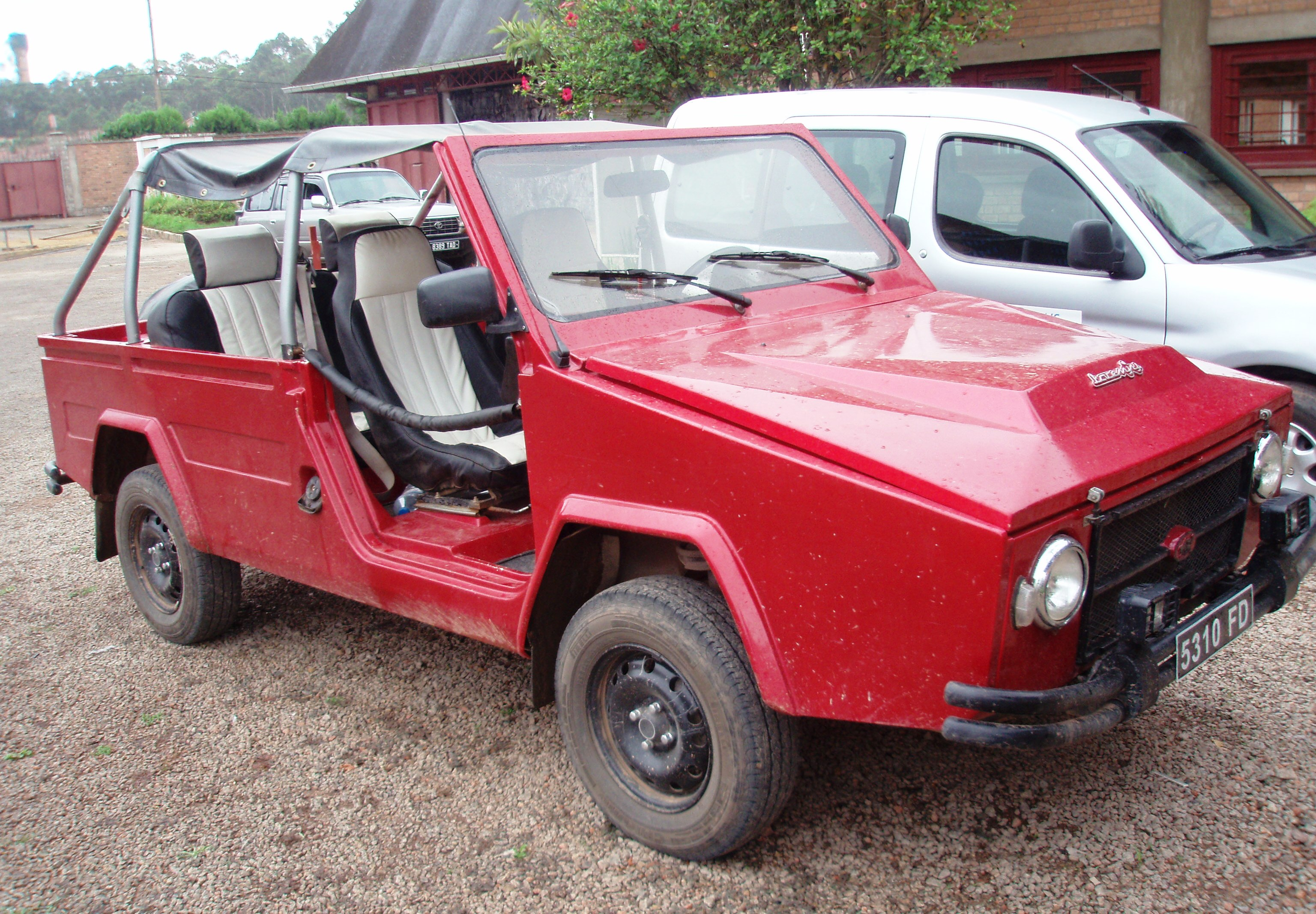
Karenjy Mazana

- Karenjy

== Malaysia ==
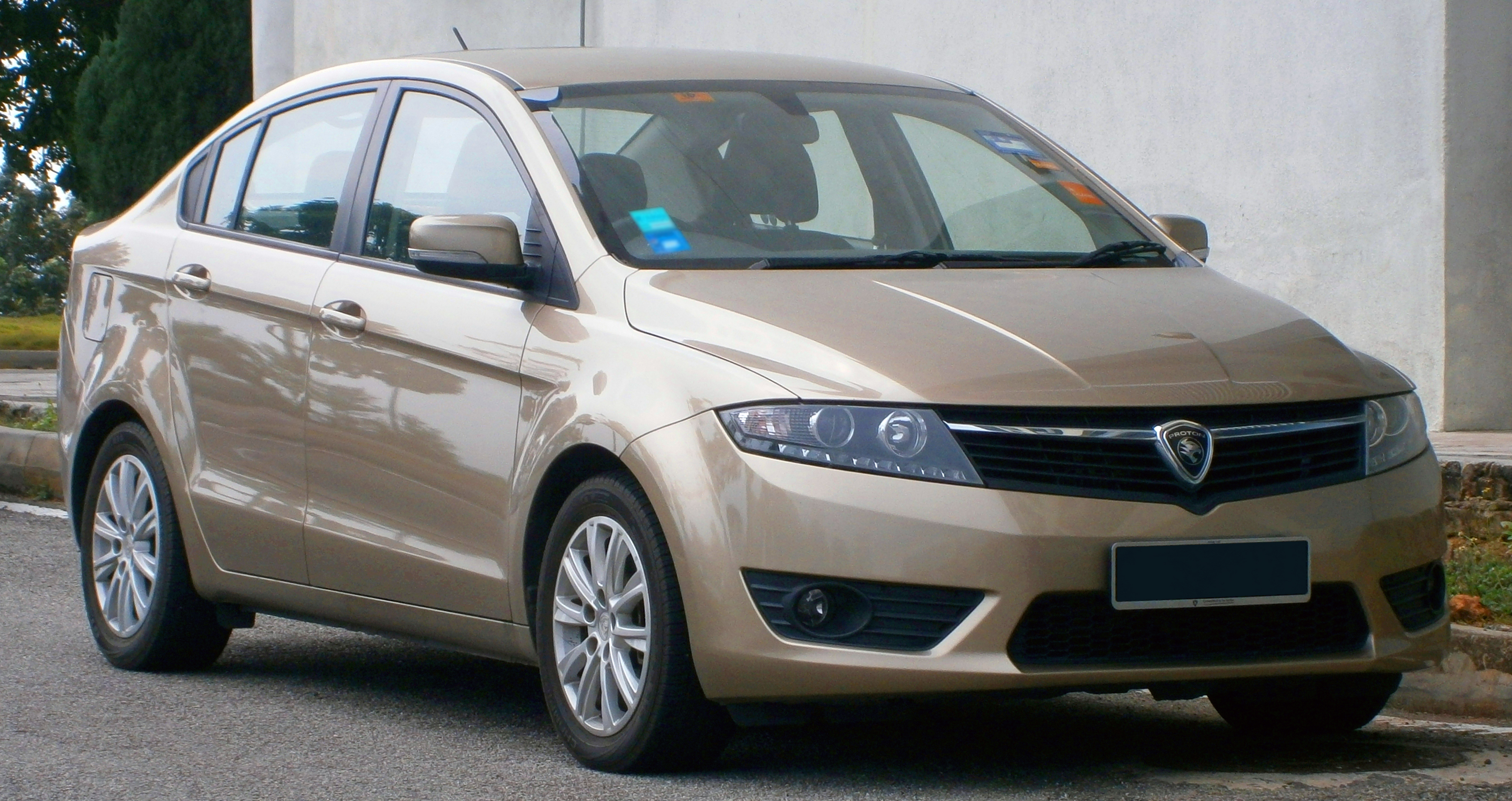
Proton Prevé

- Bufori
- Proton
- Perodua
- TD2000
- Inokom
- Naza
- Hicom

== Mexico ==
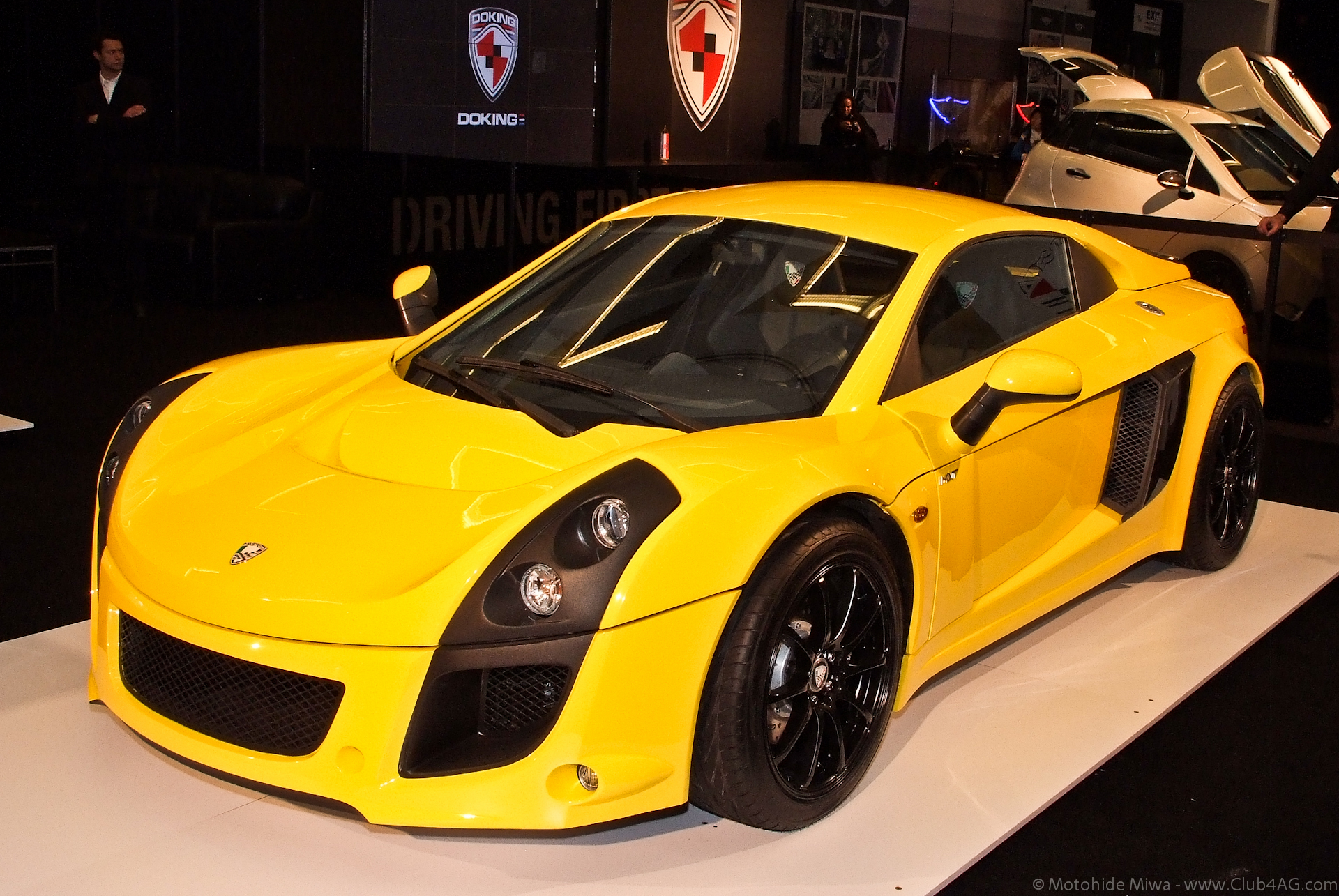
Mastretta MXT

- Dina
- Mastretta
- VAM
- Zacua

== Monaco ==
- Venturi

== Morocco ==
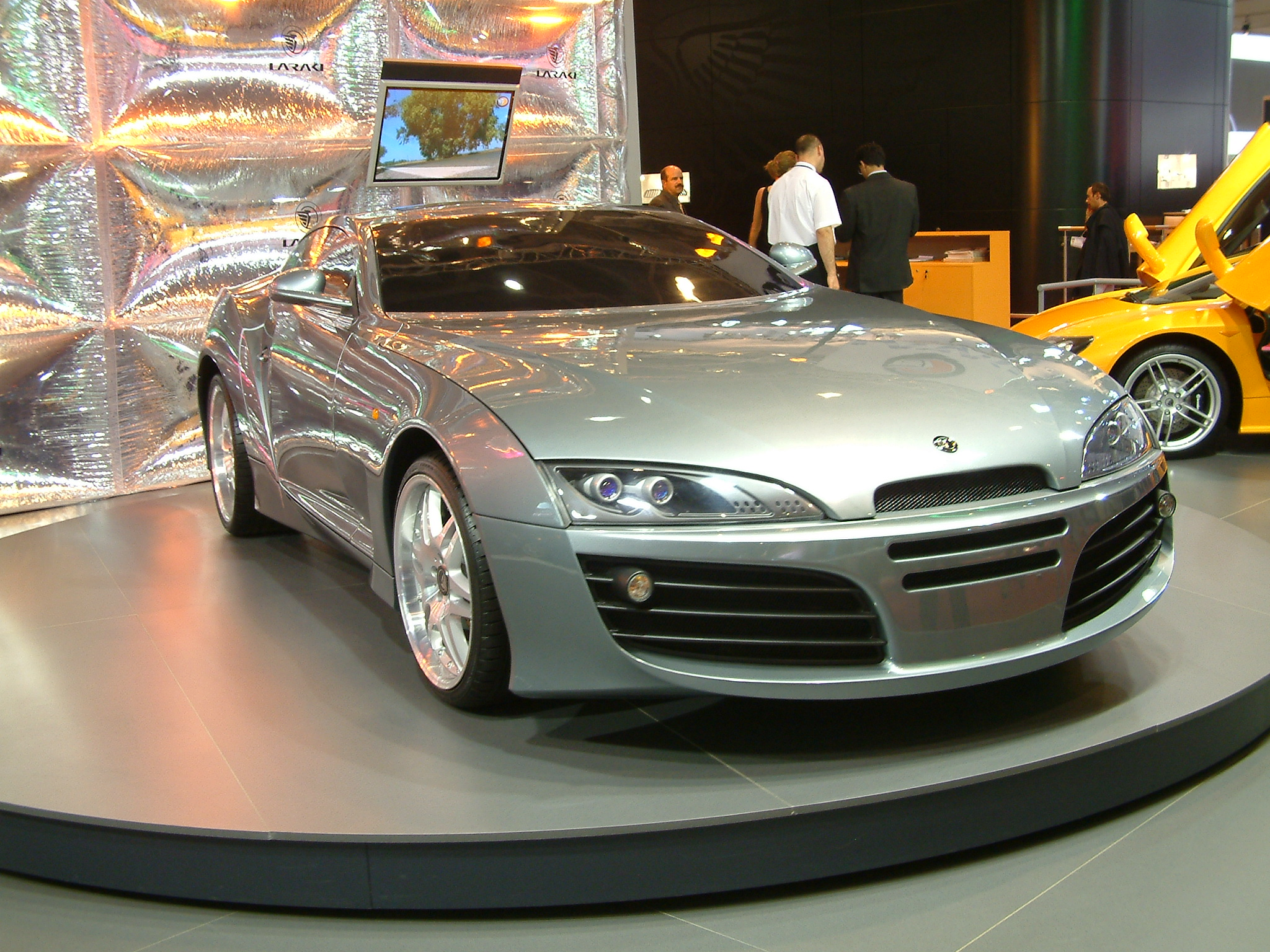
Laraki Borac

- Laraki

== Namibia ==
- Uri-Automobile (1995–2008; moved to South Africa)

== Nepal ==
- Hulas Motors

== Netherlands ==
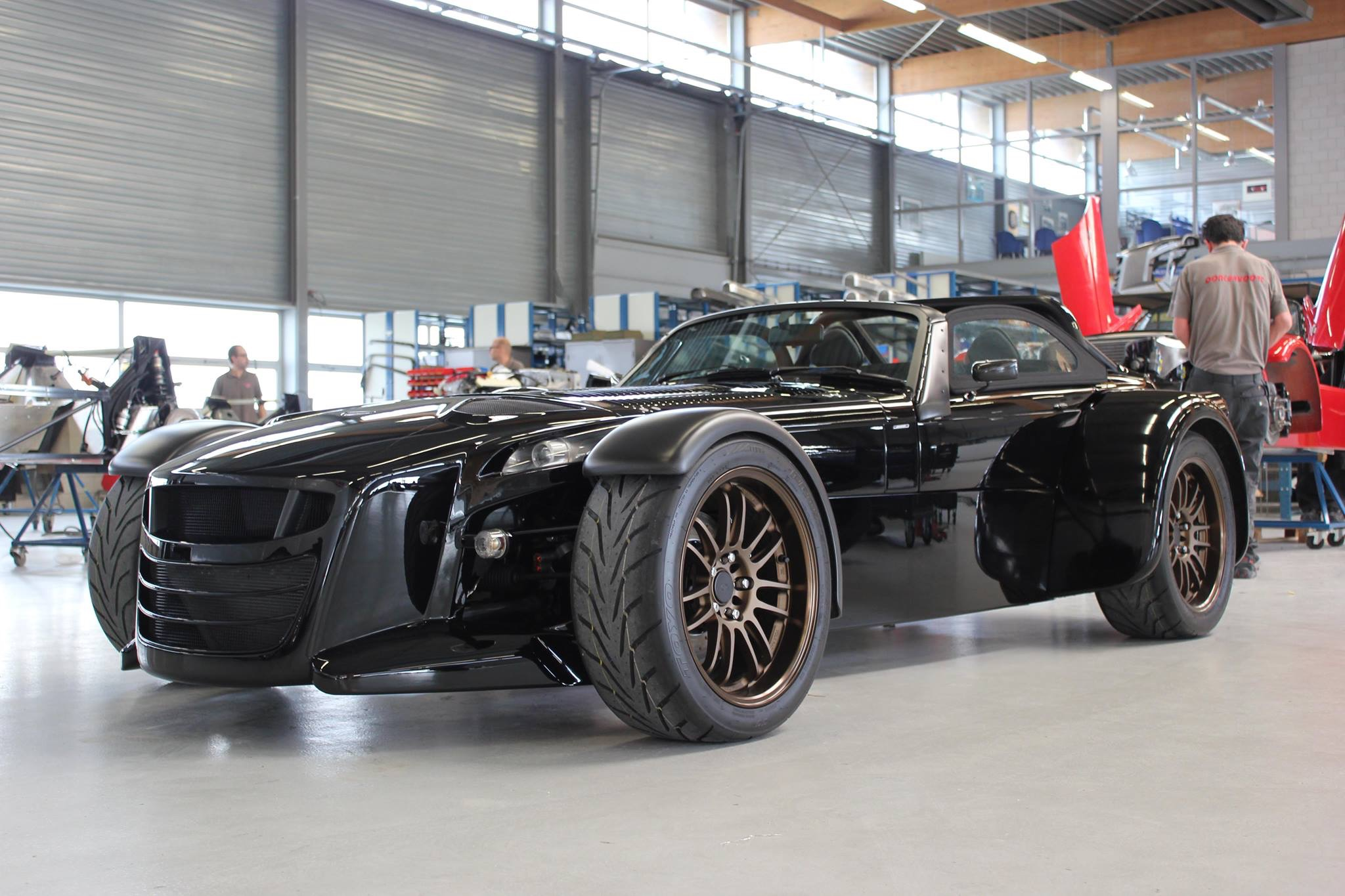
Donkervoort D8 GTO

=== Active ===
- Donkervoort
- Van Doorne's Automobiel Fabrieken
- Savage Rivale (2012–present)
- Spyker (1999–present)
- Vencer

=== Former ===
- DAF
- Spyker (1899–1926)
- Eysink
- VDL Nedcar

== New Zealand ==
=== Active ===
- Almac (1985–present)
- Alternative Cars (1984–present)
- Chevron (1984–present)
- Fraser (1988'present)
- Hulme (2005–present)
- Leitch (1986–present)
- Saker (1989–present)

=== Former ===
- Anziel (1967)
- Beattie (1997–2001) thence Redline
- Carlton (1922–1928)
- Cobra (1983–1990)
- Crowther (1968–1978)
- De Joux (1970)
- Dennison (1900–1905) – New Zealand's first indigenous car
- Everson (1935–1989)
- Heron (1964–1990)
- Marlborough (1912–1922) thence Carlton
- McRae (1990–2003)
- Mistral (1957–1960)
- Redline (2001–2009)
- Steel Brothers (1973–1981)
- Trekka (1966–1973)
- UltraCommuter (2006–2013)
- Wood (1901–1903)

== Nigeria ==
- Izuogu (1997–2006)
- Innoson Vehicle Manufacturing

== North Korea ==
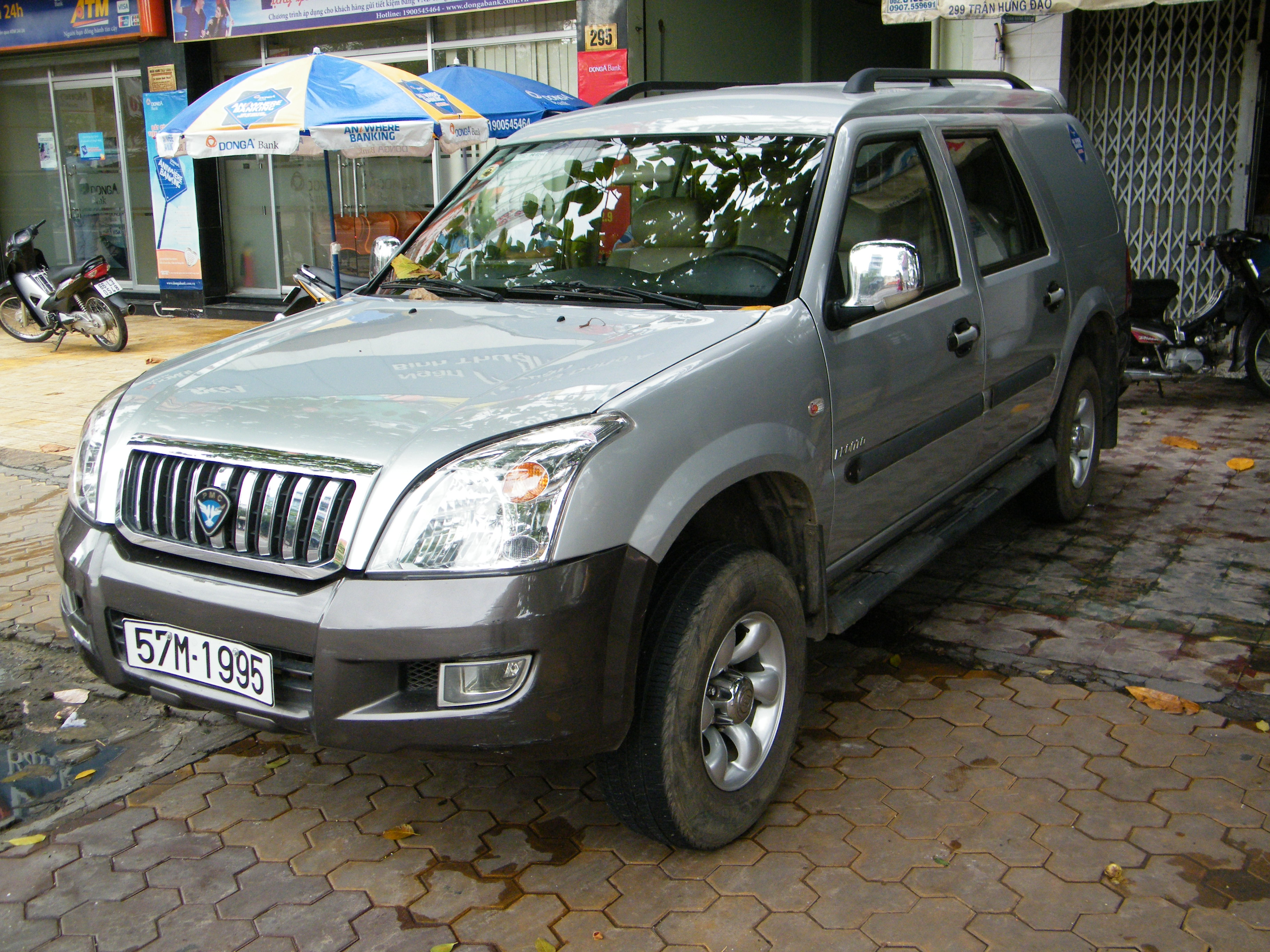
Pyeonghwa Pronto

- Pyeonghwa Motors
- Sungri Motors

== Norway ==
=== Active ===
- Kongsberg

=== Former ===
- Bjering
- Buddy
- Geijer
- Norsk
- Think
- Troll

== Pakistan ==
Pakistan does not have any globally recognized indigenous passenger car brands of its own, as its automotive sector relies entirely on local assembly and distribution of international brands.

=== Active ===
- Atlas Honda
- Honda Atlas Cars Pakistan
- FAW Pakistan
- Ghandhara Nissan
- Ghandhara Industries
- Heavy Industries Taxila
- Hinopak
- Master
- Millat Tractors
- Pak Suzuki
- Indus Motors Company
- Yamaha Motor Pakistan
- Sazgar
- Hyundai Nishat Motors
- Kia Lucky Motors
- United Auto Industries
- Prince DFSK
- MG JW Automobile

=== Former ===
- Adam Motor Company (Defunct)
- Nexus Automotive (Defunct)
- Dewan Farooque Motors (Defunct)

== Poland ==
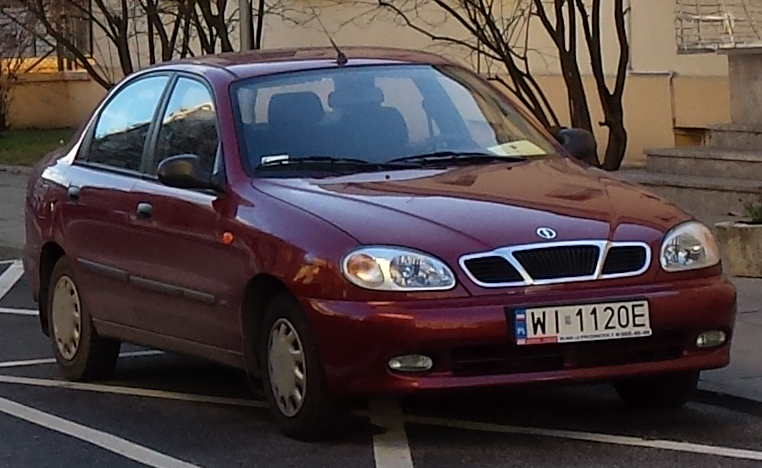
FSO Lanos

- Arrinera (2001–2015)
- FSO (1925–2002)
- Melex
- Polski Fiat (1932–1939, 1968–1992)
- Ferrari Polski (2024–present)

== Portugal ==
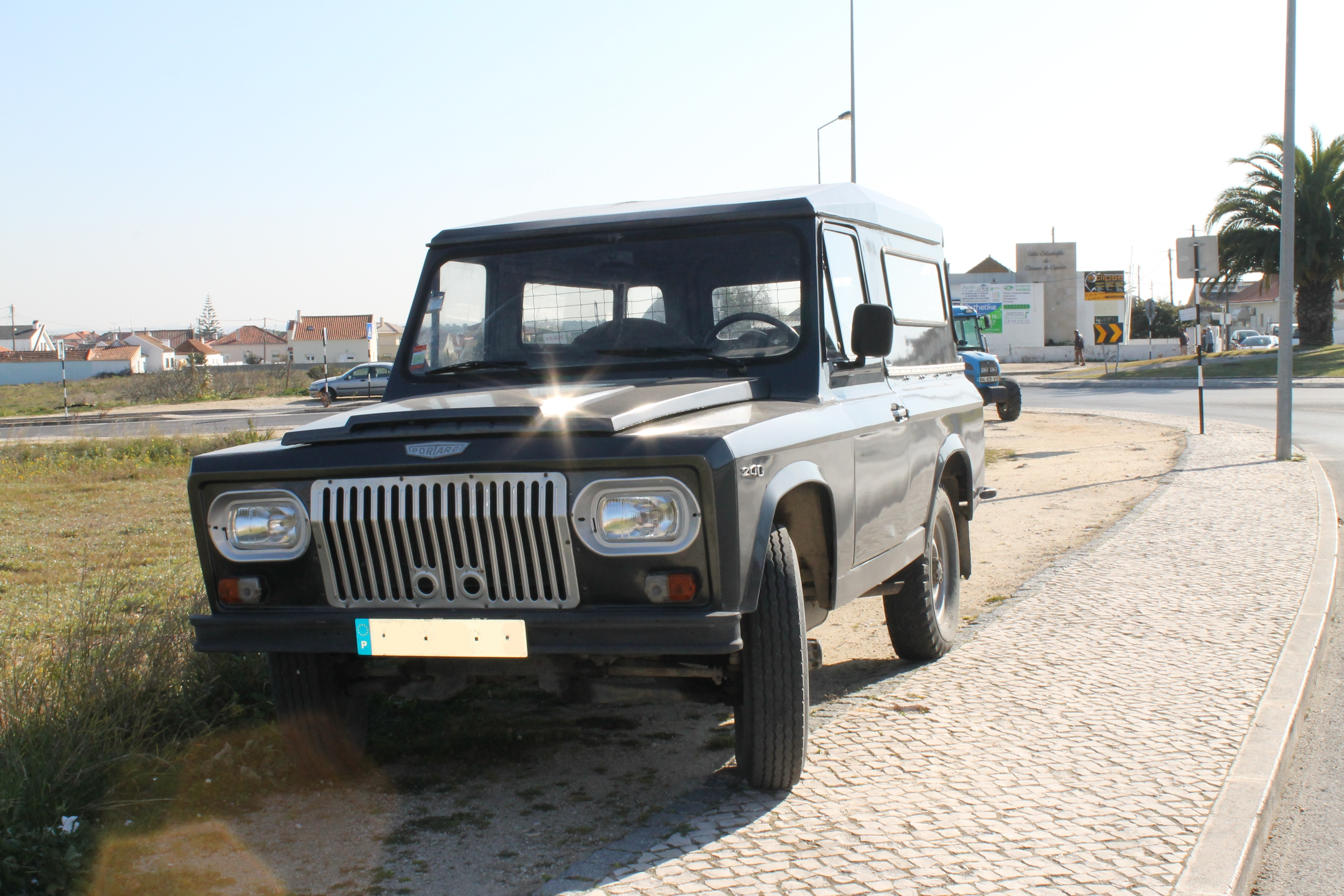
Portaro 240

=== Former ===
- UMM (União Metalo-Mecânica) (1978–2001)
- Portaro (1975–1995)

== Romania ==
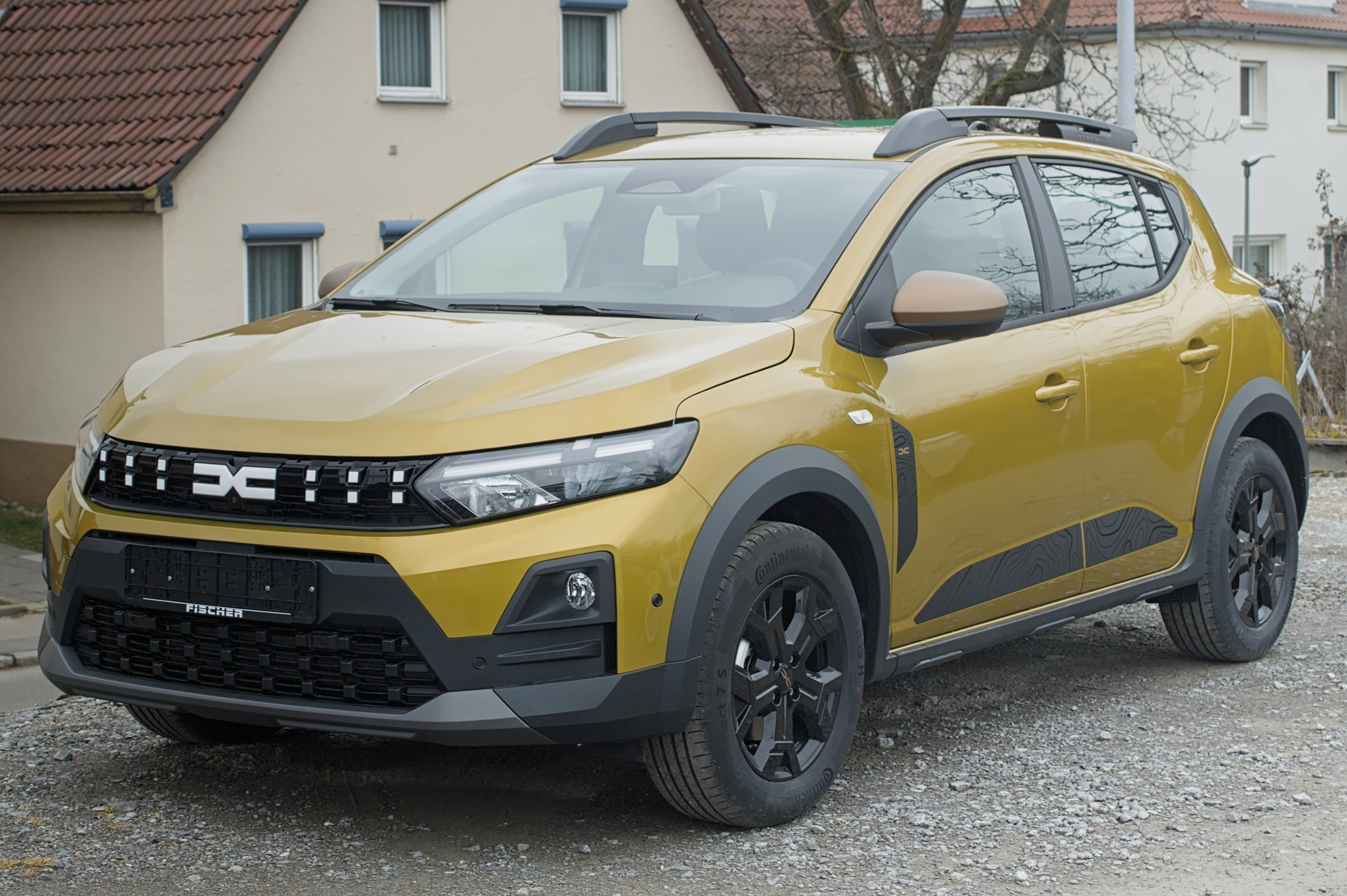
Dacia Sandero Stepway

=== Active ===
- Dacia (1966–present)

=== Former ===
- ARO (1957–2006)
- Oltcit (1976–1991)
- Oltena (1991–1994)

== Russia ==
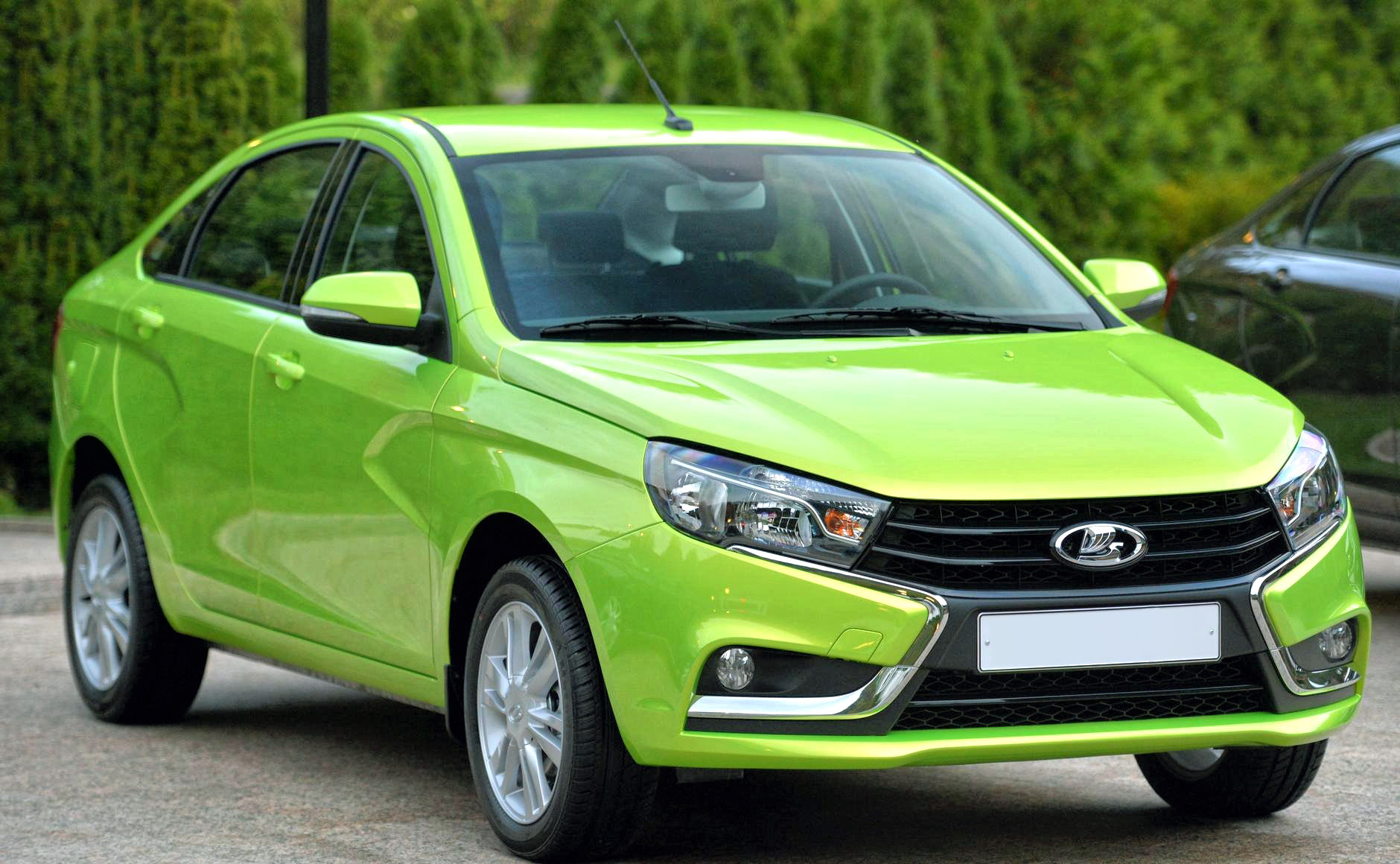
Lada Vesta

=== Active ===
- Aurus Motors (2018–present)
- GAZ (1932–present)
- Lada (1966–present)
- Moskvich (1930–present)
- KamAZ (1969–present)
- UAZ (1941–present)
- Sollers (2022–'resent)
- BelAZ

=== Former ===
- Derways (2003–2019)
- Izh (1965–2008)
- Marussia (2007–2014)
- TagAZ (1997–2014)
- ZiL (1916–2013)

== Saudi Arabia ==
- Ceer Motors (from 2022)

== Serbia ==
=== Active ===
- FAP (1952–present)
- FCA Srbija (2008–present)
- Zastava TERVO (2017–present)

=== Former ===
- IDA-Opel (1977–1992)
- Yugo (1944–2008)
- Zastava (1953–2008)

== Slovakia ==
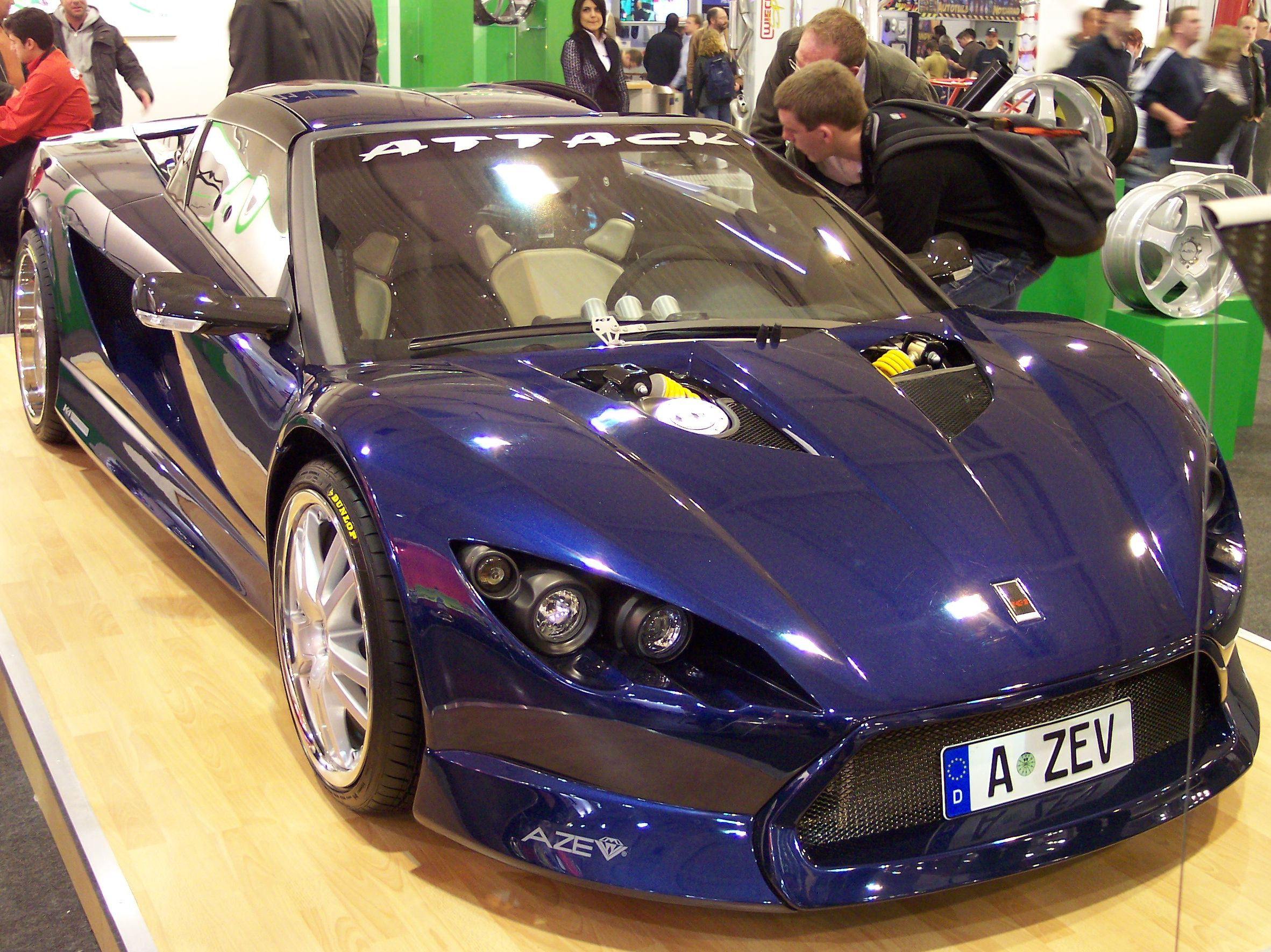
K-1 Attack

=== Active ===
- K-1 Engineering
- Troliga Bus

=== Former ===
- Granu
- Novoplan
- SlovBus
- Trnavské automobilové závody

== Slovenia ==
=== Active ===
- Revoz

=== Former ===
- TAM (1947–2011)
- Tushek & Spigel

== South Africa ==
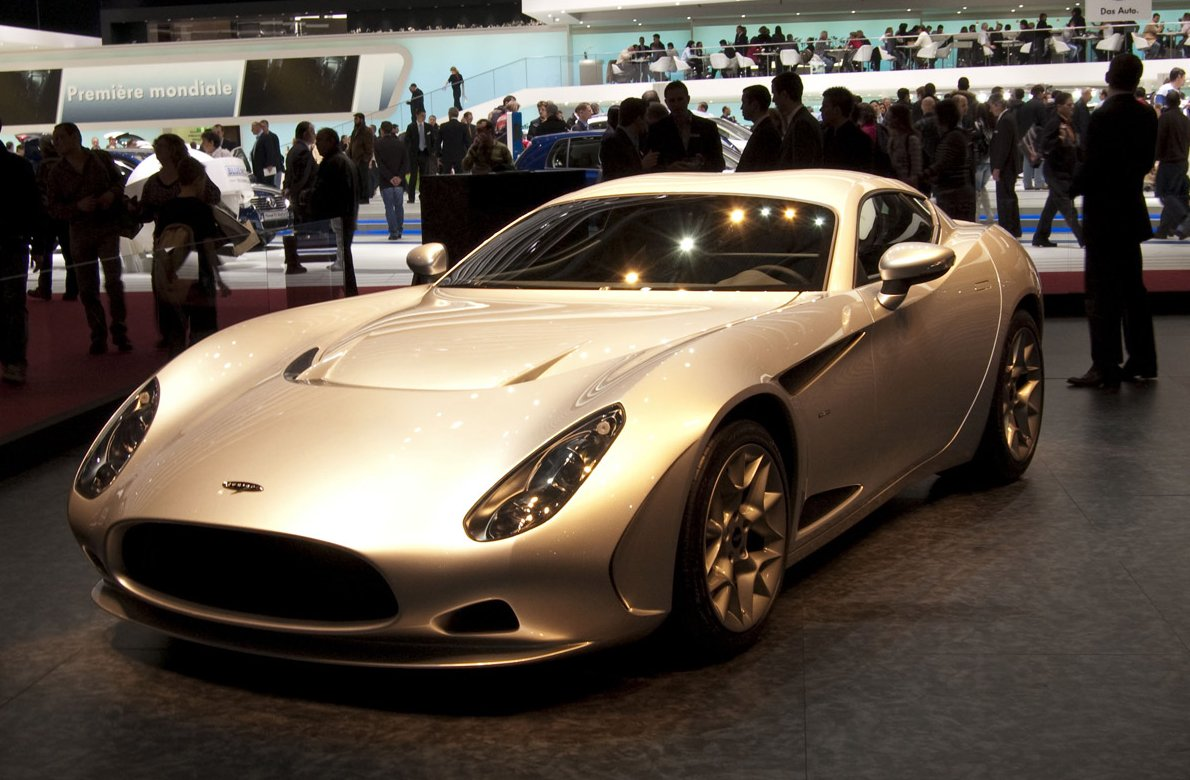
Perana Z-One

=== Active ===
- Birkin (1982–present)
- Perana (2007–present)
- Puma (1973–1974, 1989–1991, 2006–present)
- Shaka (1995–present)
- Superformance (1996–present)
- Uri International Vehicle & Equipment Marketing (2008–present)

=== Former ===
- Eagle
- GSM (1958–1964)
- Hayden Dart (1997–2003)
- Hi-Tech (1992–1996)
- Optimal Energy (2008–2012)
- Perana (1967–1996; a famous Ford manufacturer, today only active as a Ford dealer)
- Protea (1957–1958)
- Ranger (1968–1973)
- Sao (1985–1994)

== South Korea ==
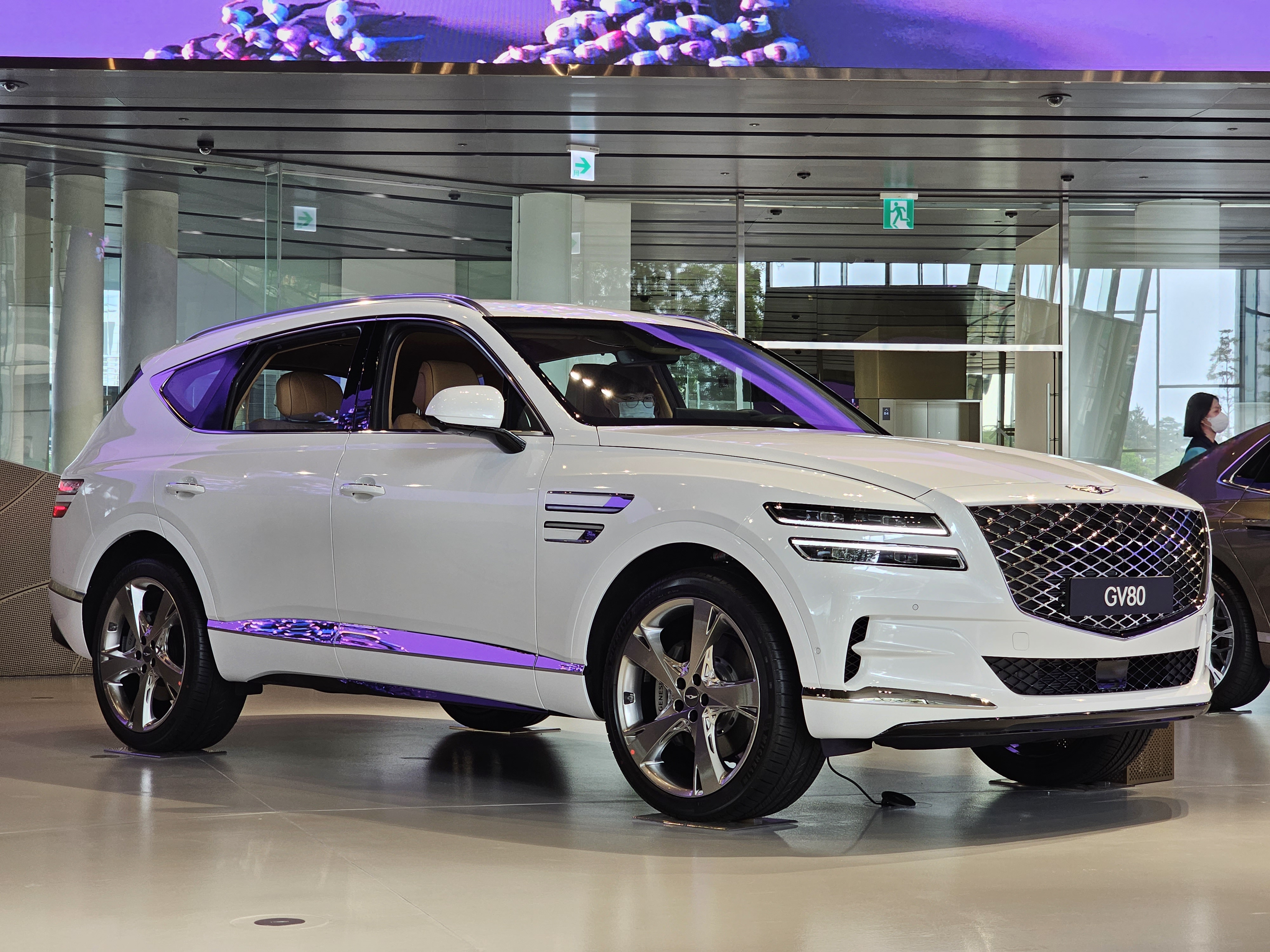
Genesis GV80

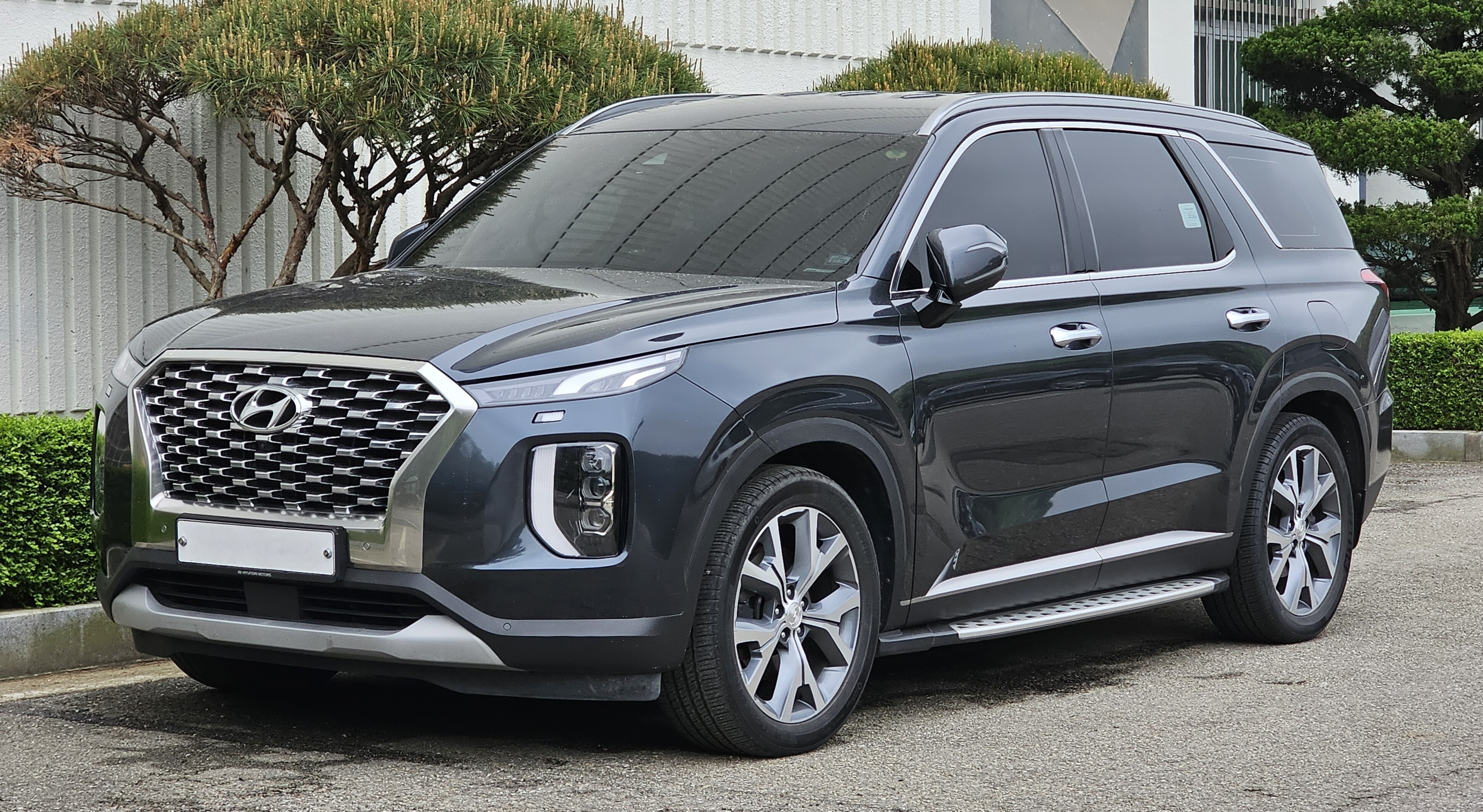
Hyundai Palisade

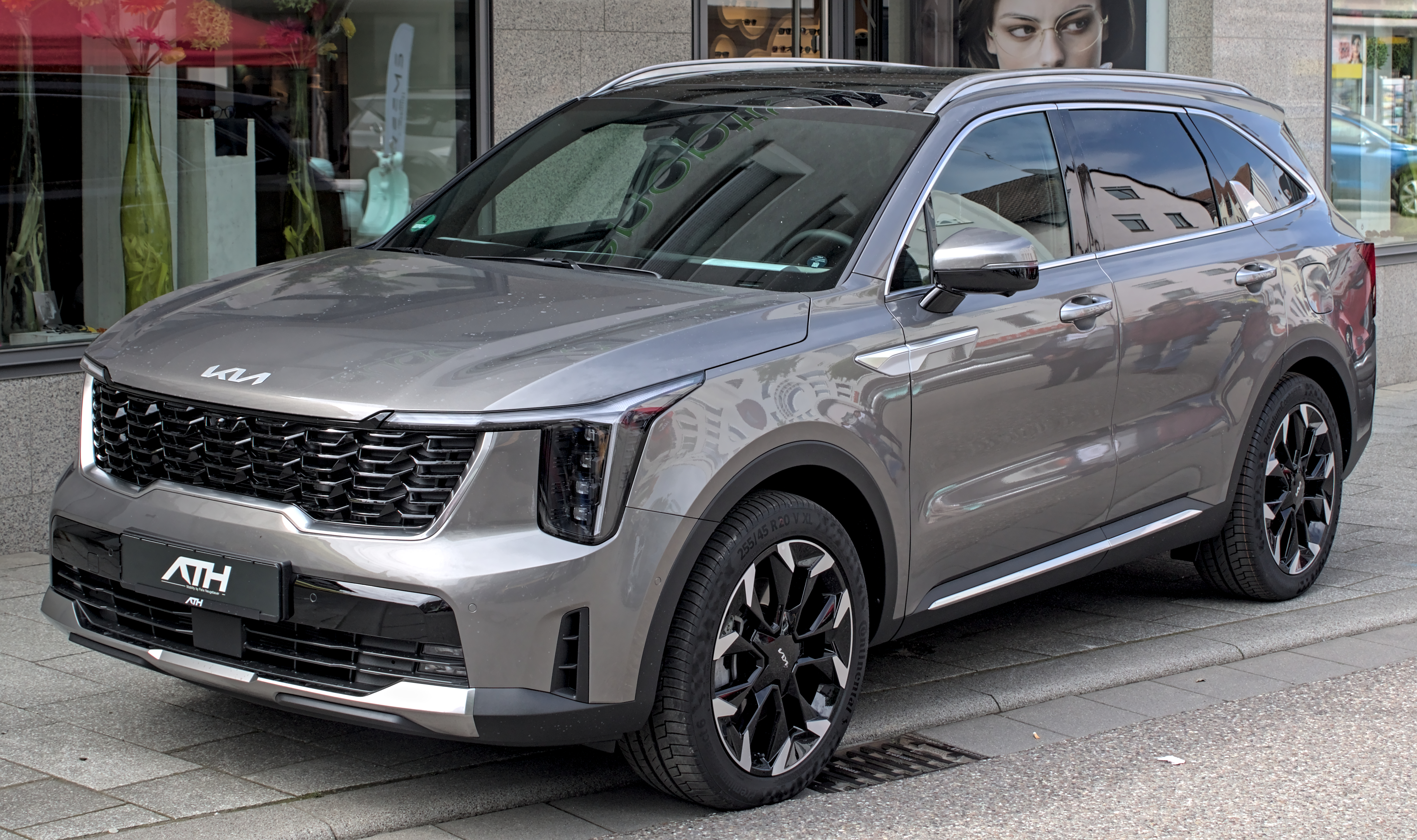
Kia Sorento

=== Active ===
- GM Korea (2004–present)
- CT&T (2002–present)
- Genesis (2007–present)
- Hyundai (1968–present)
- Kia (1962–present)
- Renault Samsung (1994–present) (renamed to Renault Korea Motors)
- Ssangyong (1988–present) (renamed to KG Mobility)

=== Former ===
- Asia (1965–1999)
- Daewoo (1983–2002)
- GMK (1972–1976)
- Proto (1997–2017)
- Saehan (1976–1983)
- Saenara (1962–1965)
- Shinjin (1965–1972)
- Spirra (2007)

== Spain ==
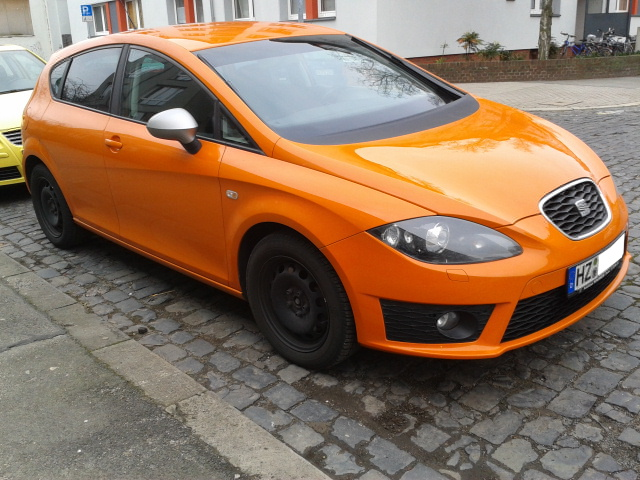
SEAT León

=== Active ===
- Aspid
- Comarth
- Cupra (1999–present)
- Gerard Farre
- GTA Motor
- Hurtan
- SEAT (1953–present)
- Spania GTA
- Tramontana (sports car)
- Tauro Sport Auto (2012–present)
- UROVESA

=== Former ===
- Hispano Suiza (planned reintroduction, 2019)
- Pegaso
- Santana

== Sweden ==
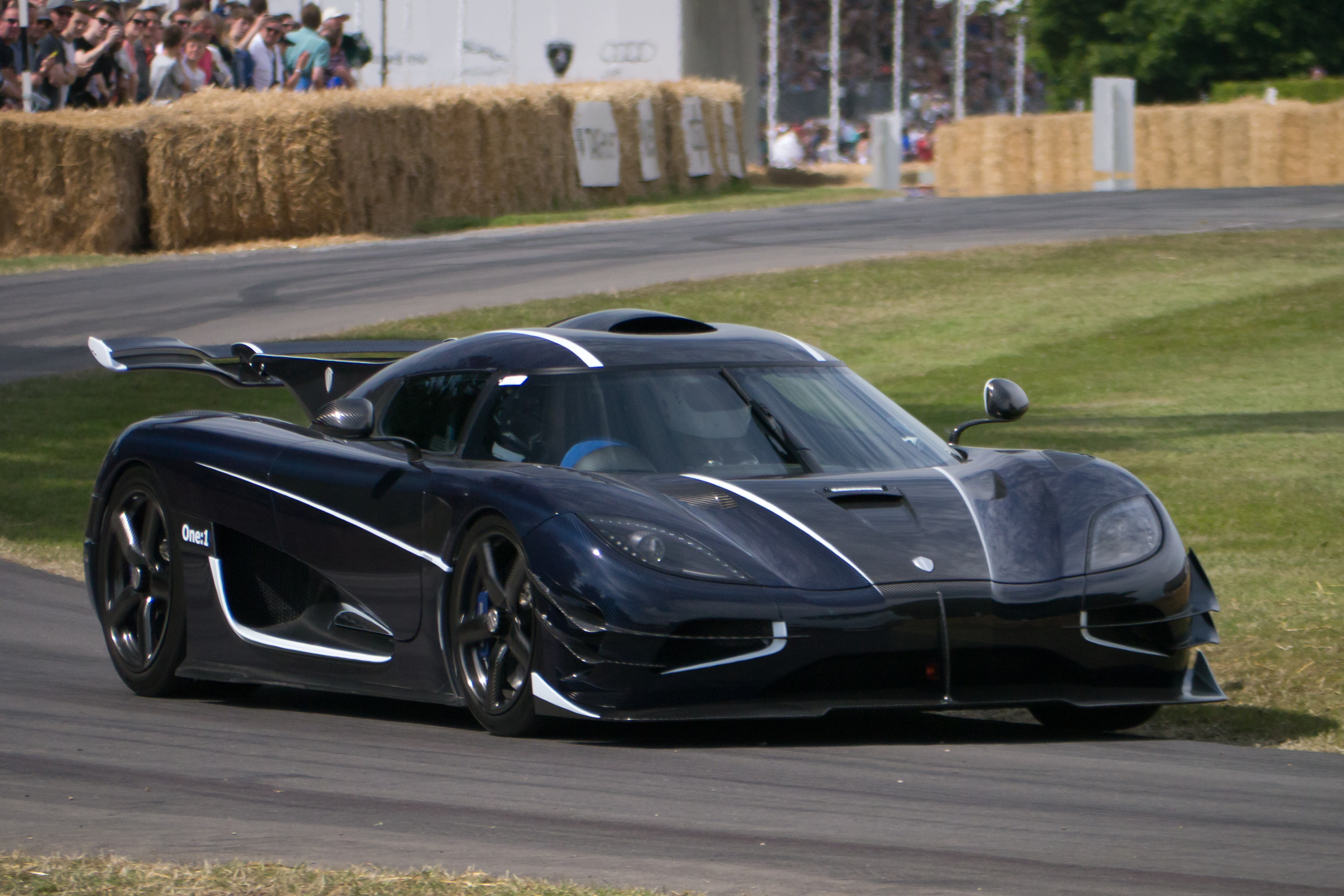
Koenigsegg Agera

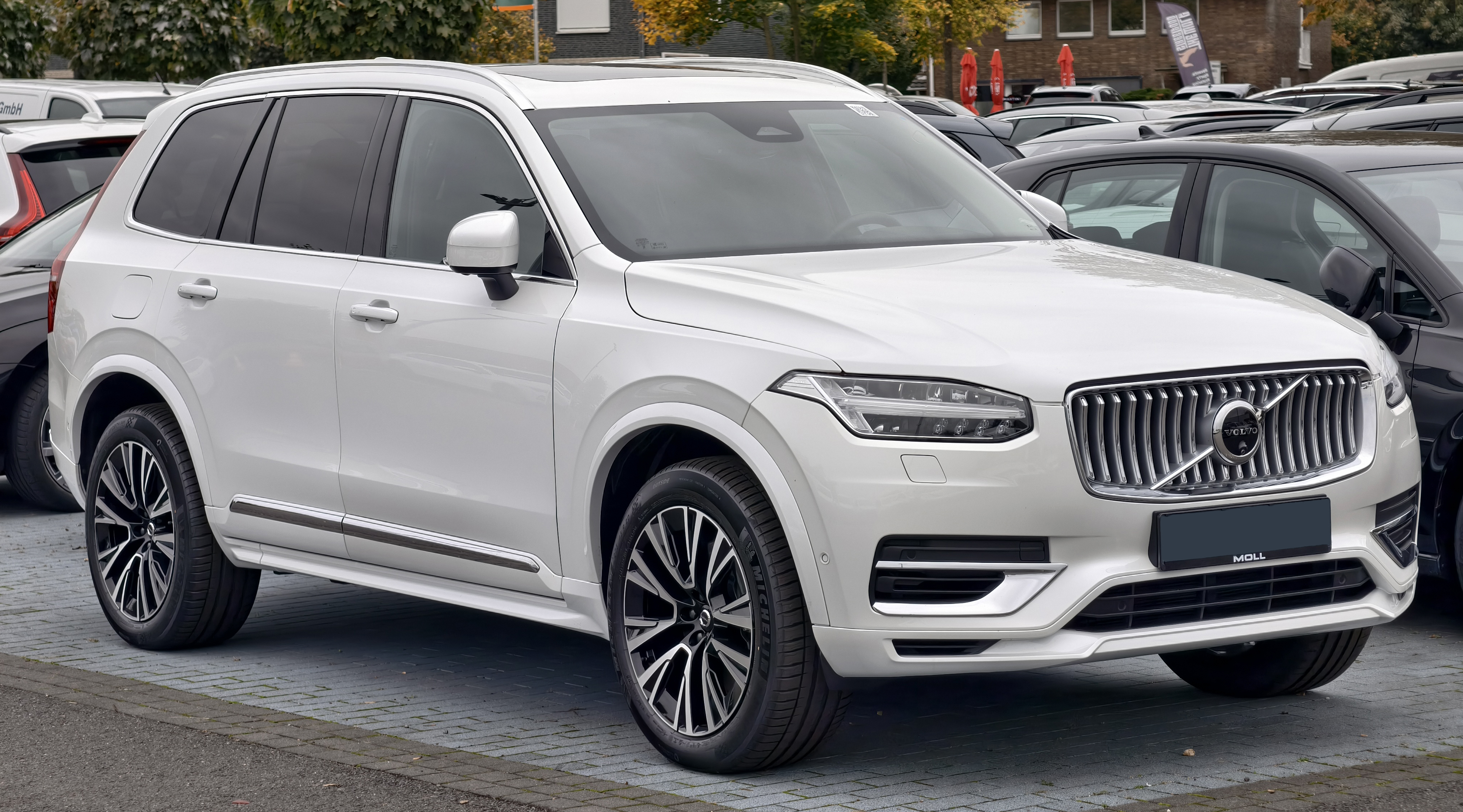
Volvo XC90

=== Active ===
- Volvo Cars (1927–present)
- Koenigsegg (1994–present)
- Polestar (1996–present)
- Scania (1911–present)

=== Former ===
- Rengsjöbilen (1914–1916)
- Saab (1945–2012)
- Hult Healey (1984–1990)
- Jösse Car (1994–1999)
- Tjorven (1968–1971)
- NEVS (2012–2023) (bought by Saab)

== Switzerland ==
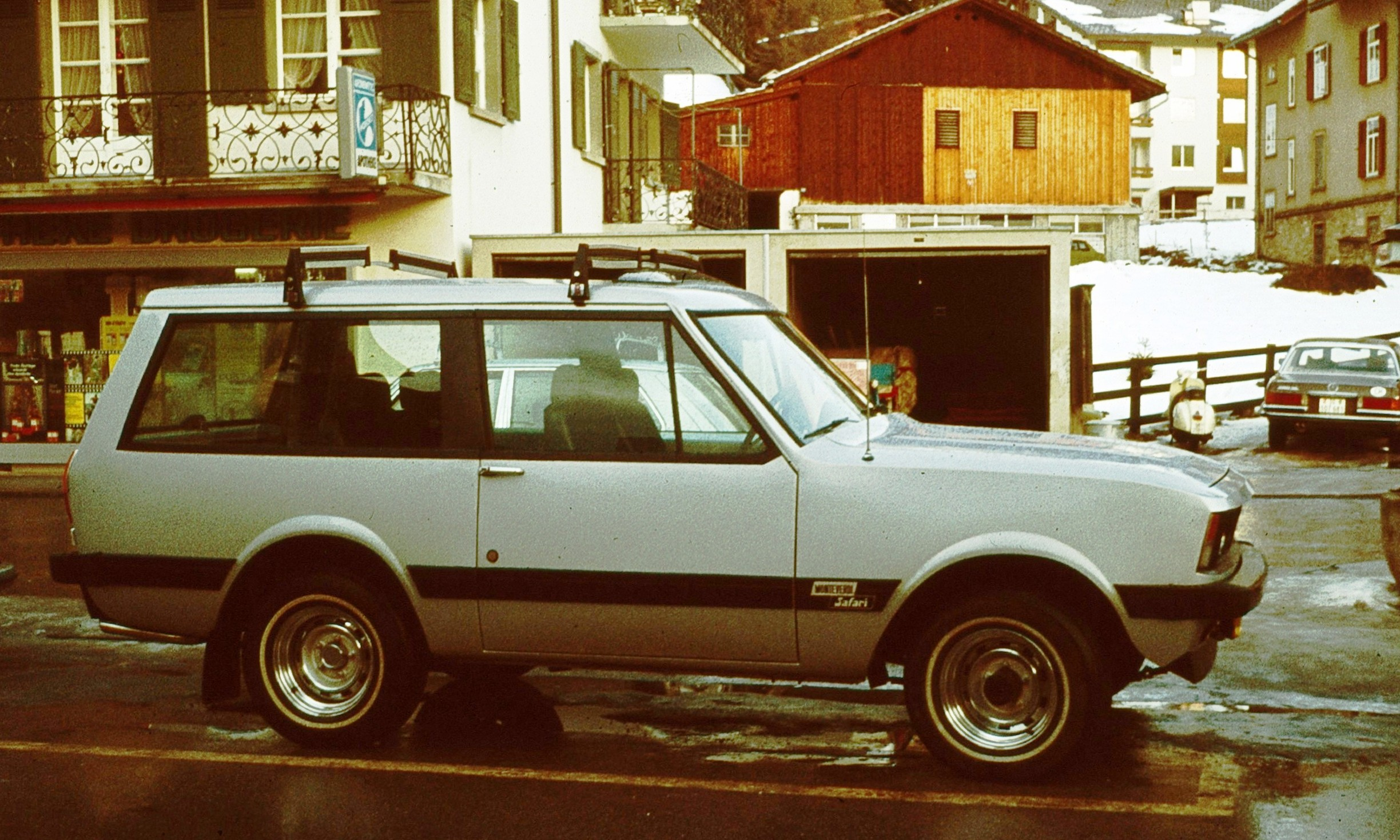
Monteverdi Safari

=== Active ===
- Micro (1996–present)
- Rinspeed (1978–present)

=== Former ===
- MBM (1960–1967)
- Monteverdi (1967–1984)
- Ranger (General Motors brand) (1970–1975)

== Taiwan ==
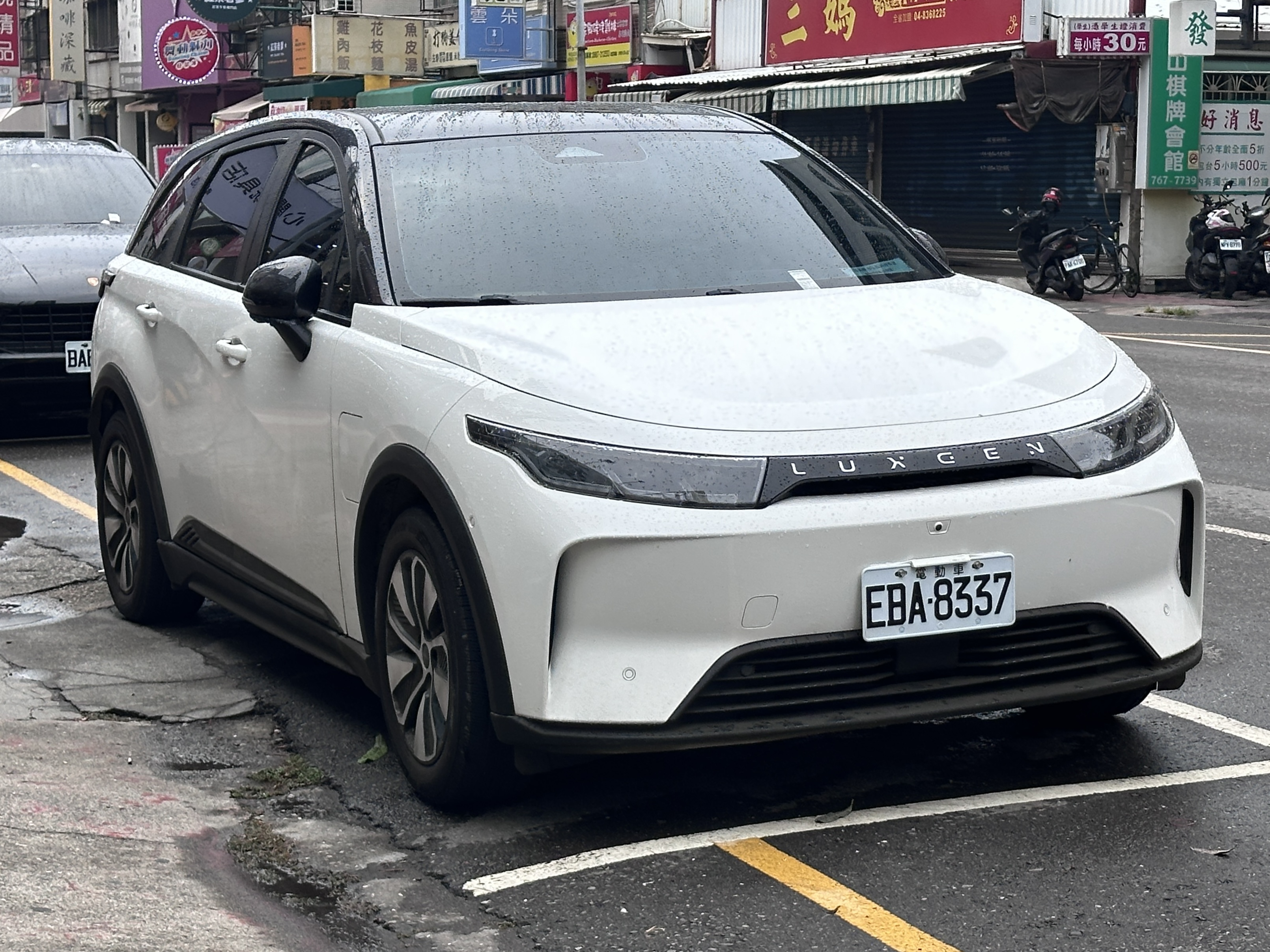
Luxgen n7

=== Active ===
- CMC (1973–present)
- Luxgen
- Yue Long/Yulon/YLN (affiliated to Nissan)

=== Former ===
- Formosa
- Thunder Power

== Thailand ==
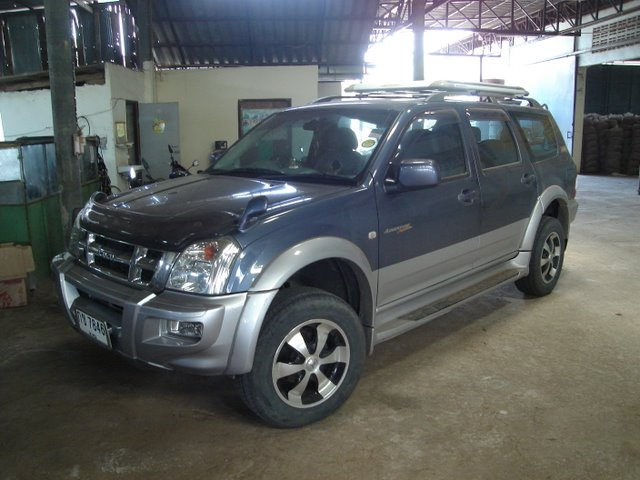
Thai Rung Adventure

- Thai Rung

== Tunisia ==
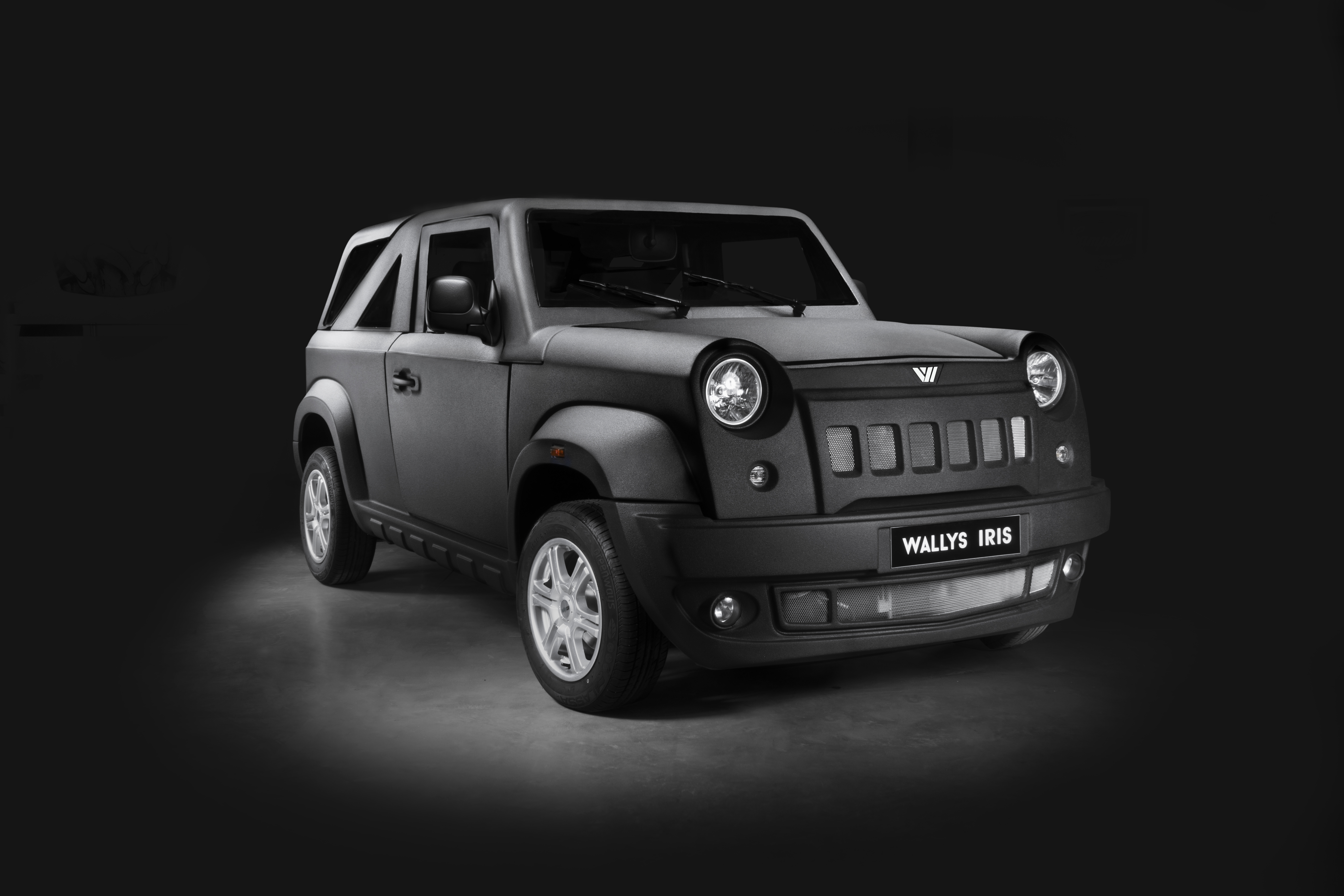
Wallys Iris

=== Active ===
- Bako Motors, since 2021, small electric vehicles.
- Industries Mécaniques Maghrébines (1982–1988, 1991–present)
- Wallyscar (2007–present)

== Turkey ==
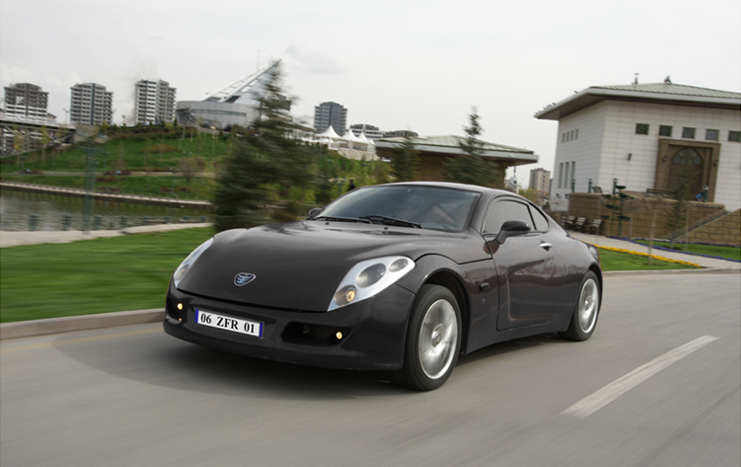
Etox Zafer

- Anadol
- Devrim
- Etox
- Özaltin
- Temsa
- Tofaş (1968–present)
- TOGG

== Uganda ==
- Kiira

== Ukraine ==
- KrAZ

== United Arab Emirates ==
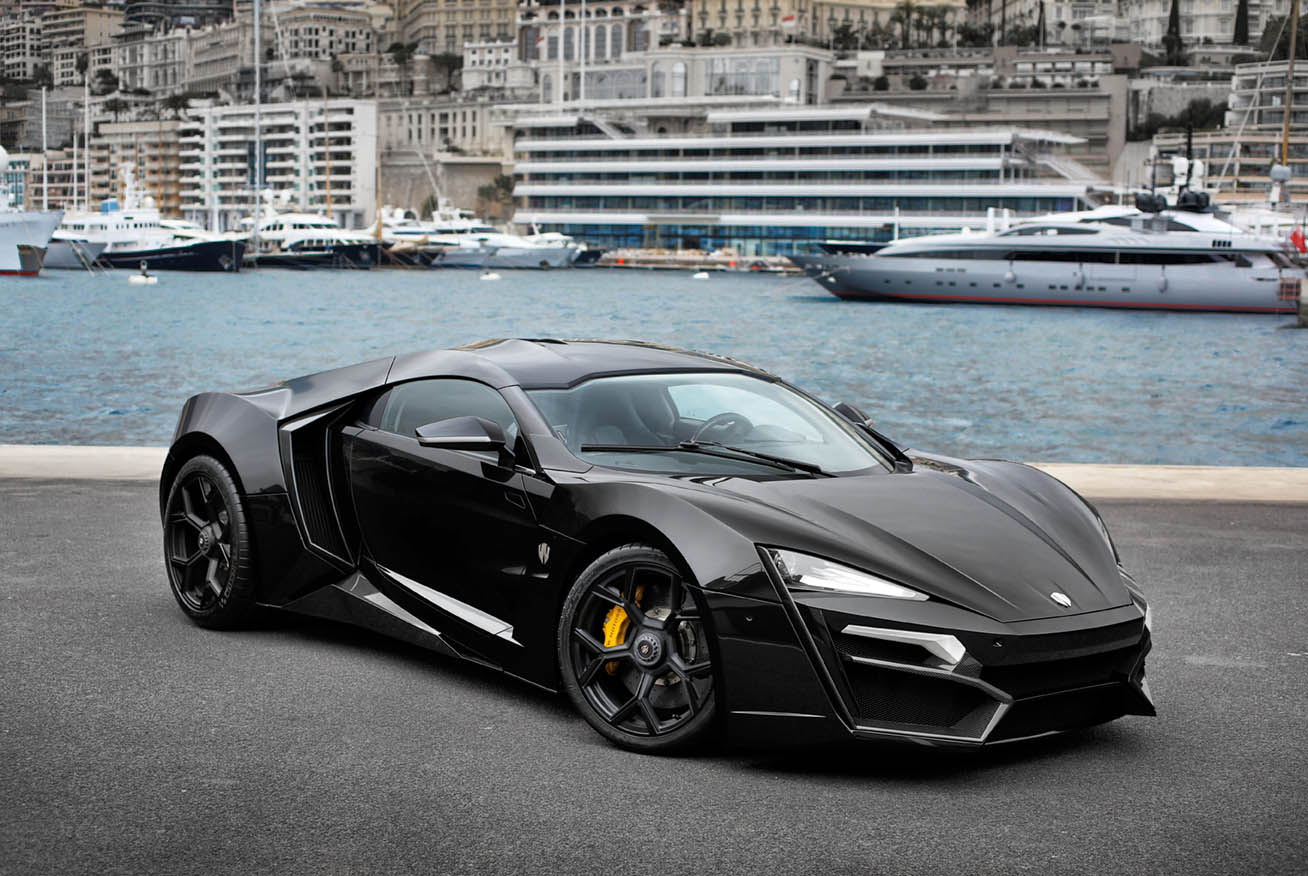
W Motors Lykan Hypersport

- Devel Motors
- W Motors

== United Kingdom ==
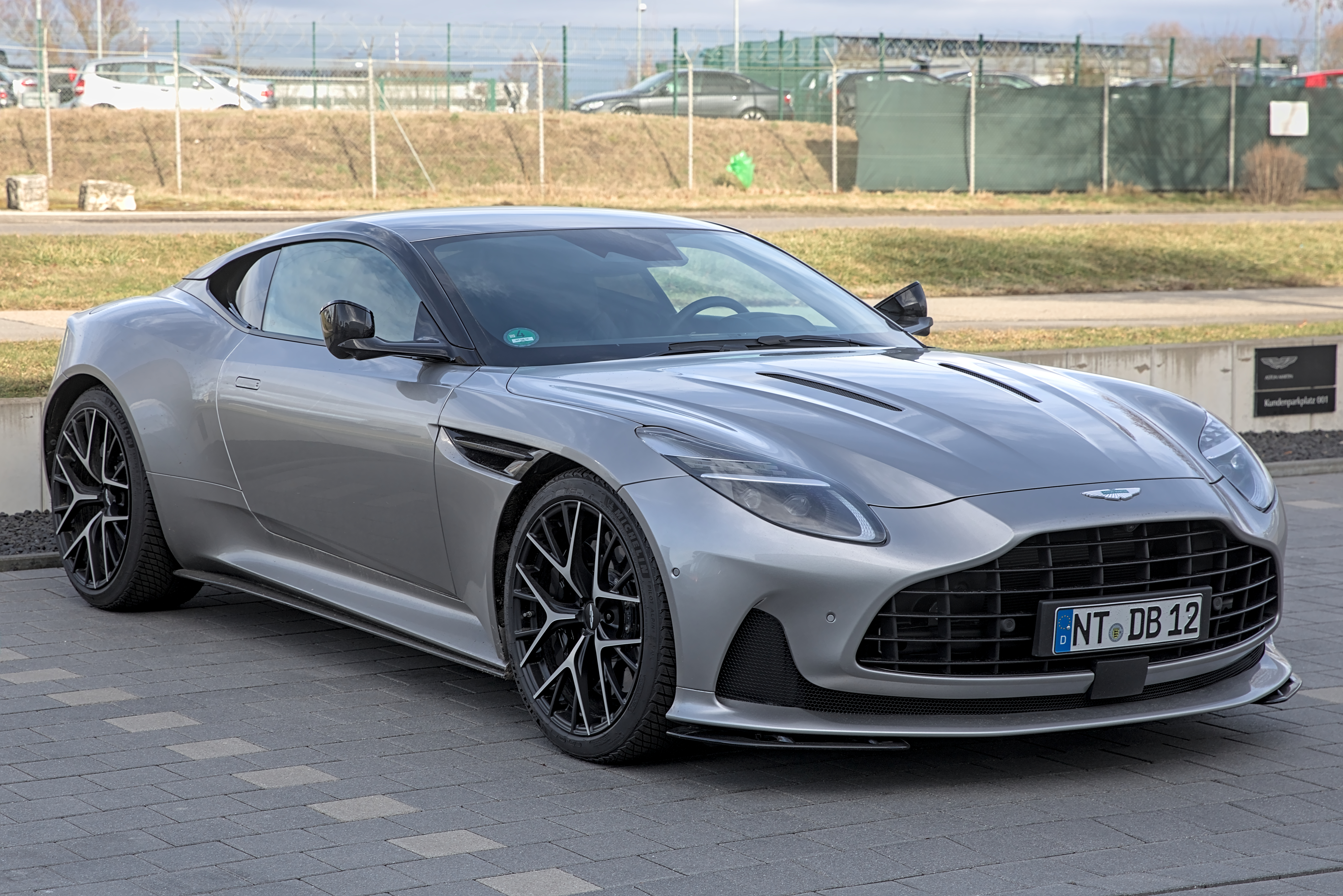
Aston Martin DB12

Bentley Bentayga

Jaguar F-Pace

Range Rover Sport

Mini Countryman

McLaren GT

Rolls-Royce Cullinan

=== Active ===
- AC Cars (1901–present)
- Arash
- Ariel (1991–present)
- Arrival (2015–present)
- Aston Martin (1913–present)
- Briggs Automotive Company (BAC)
- Bentley (1919–present)
- Caterham Cars (1957–present)
- David Brown (2013–present)
- Ginetta (1958–present)
- Gordon Murray Automotive (2017–present)
- Ineos Automotive (2017–present)
- Jaguar (1935–present)
- Lagonda
- Land Rover (1948–present)
- Lister
- London Electric Vehicle Company (LEVC) (2013–present)
- Lotus (1952–present)
- Mini
- McLaren (2010–present)
- Morgan (1910–present)
- Noble (1999–present)
- Radical (1997–present)
- Rolls-Royce (1904–present)
- TVR (1946–2006, 2013–present)
- Vauxhall (1903–present)

=== Former ===
- Albion (1899–1972)
- Allard (1945–1957)
- Alvis
- Armstrong Siddeley
- Ascari (1995–2010)
- Austin
- Austin-Healey (1952–1972)
- Bedford
- Berkeley (1956–1960)
- Bond
- Bristol (1945–2020)
- British Leyland
- British Motor Corporation
- British Salmson (1934–1939)
- Buckler (1947–1962)
- Chambers Motors (1904–1929)
- Chrysler Europe (1976–1979)
- Clan (1971–1974)
- Crossley (1906–1958)
- Daimler
- Dellow (1949–1956)
- Durant (Produced the Star, 1922–1928)
- Dutton
- Elva
- Enfield (1973–1976)
- Fairthorpe
- Farboud Limited (1999–2006)
- Frazer Nash (1925–1957)
- Gilbern (1959–1973)
- Gordon-Keeble
- Healey
- Hillman
- Humber
- Invacar
- Invicta
- Jensen
- Jowett (1906–1954)
- Keating Supercars (2006–2021)
- Lanchester
- LDV
- Lea-Francis
- Lloyd (1936–1950)
- Lotus-Cortina
- Marauder (1950–1952)
- MG (1924–2011)
- Metropolitan (1953–1961)
- Midas
- Morris (1913–1984)
- Nash-Healey (1951–1954)
- Panther (1972–1990)
- Paramount (1950–1956)
- Peel Engineering Company (1955–1969)
- Peerless (1957–1960)
- Princess (1957–1960, 1975–1981)
- Reliant
- Riley (1907–1969)
- Rover (1904–2005)
- RW (1983–2000)
- Singer
- Spartan (1973–1995)
- Standard
- Sunbeam
- Sunbeam-Talbot
- Swallow (1954–1955)
- Talbot
- Tornado
- Trident
- Triumph
- Trojan
- Turner
- Tyrrell
- Vanden Plas
- Warwick (1960–1962)
- Wolseley

== United States ==
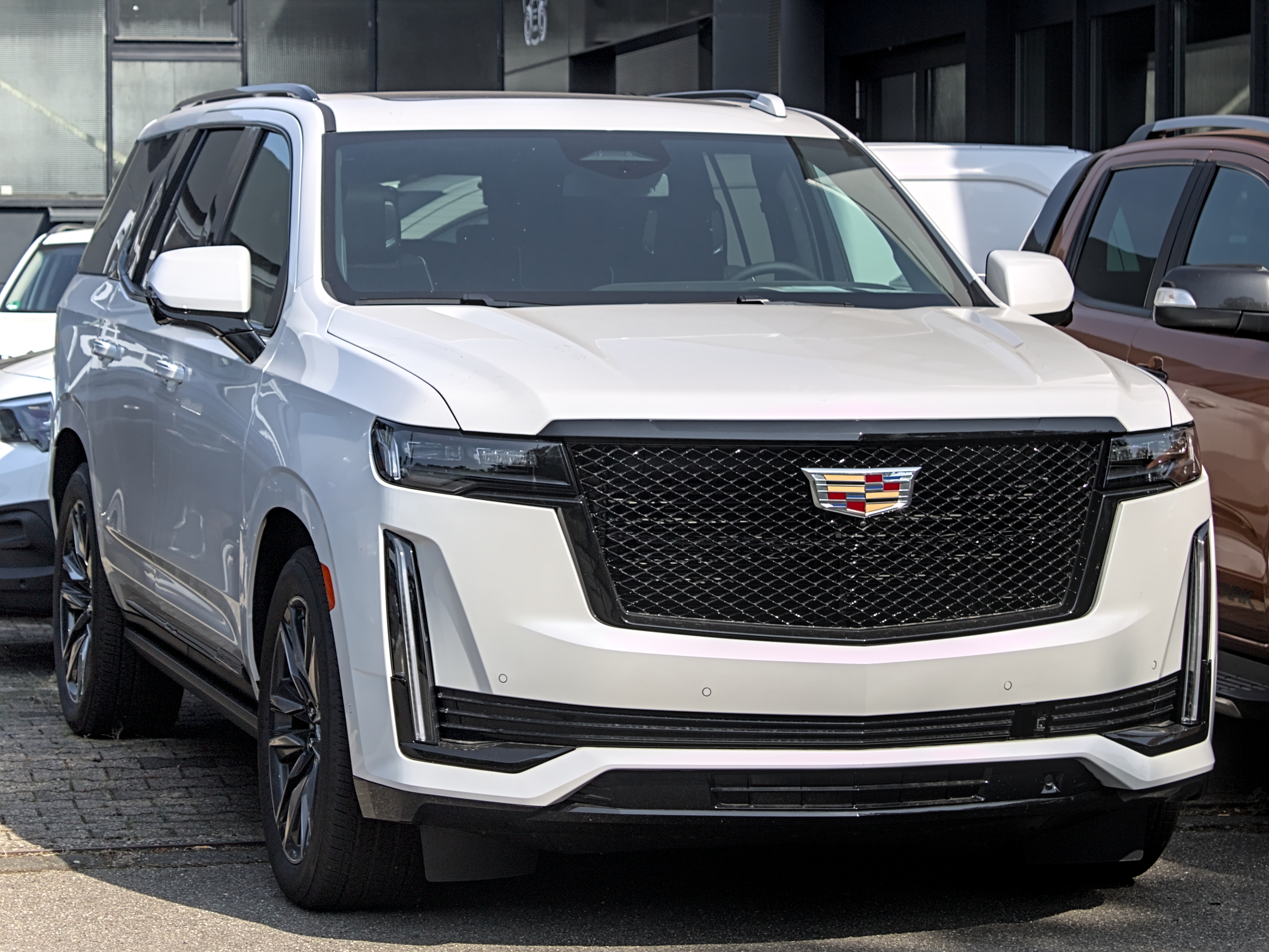
Cadillac Escalade

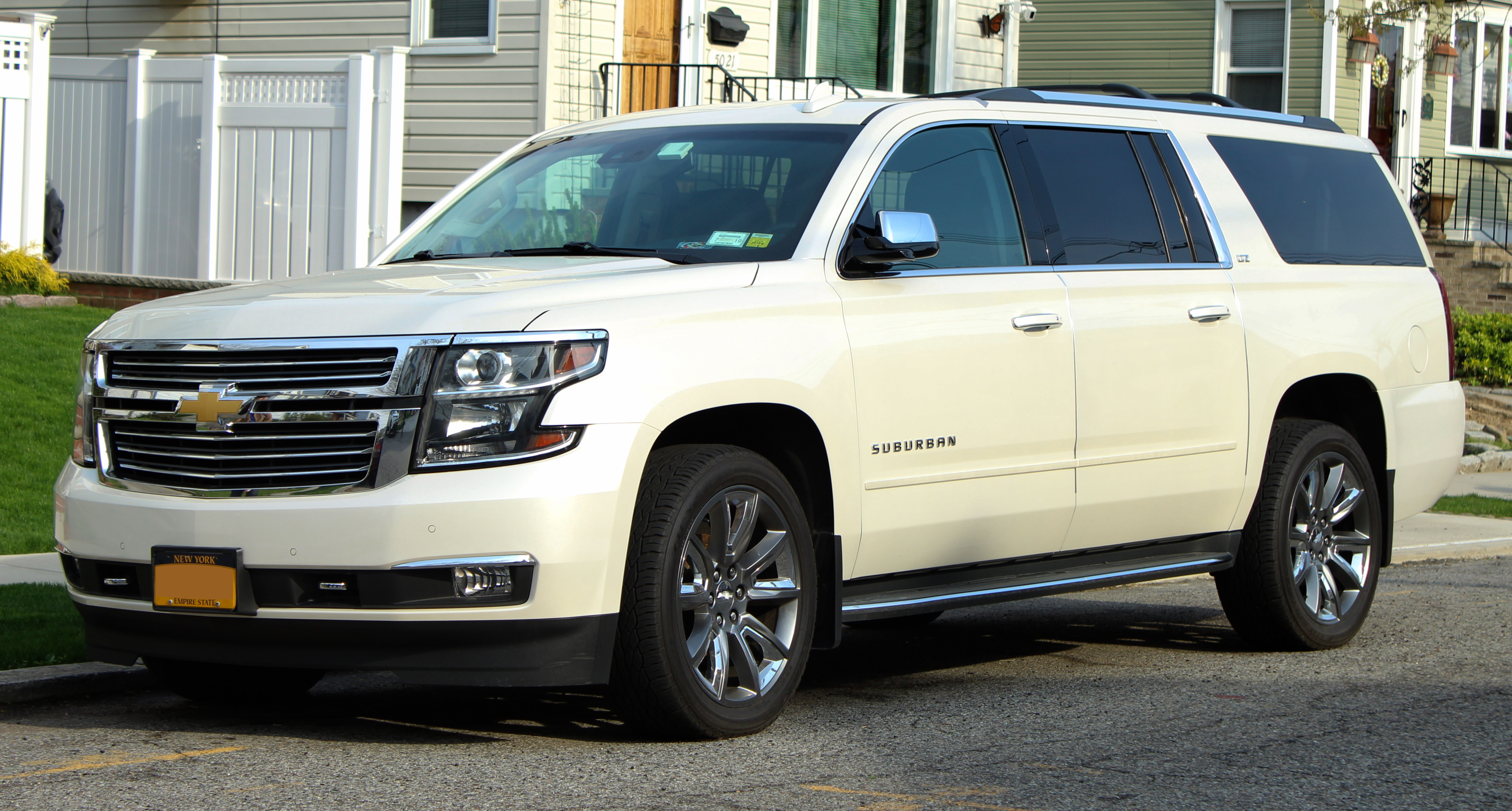
Chevrolet Suburban

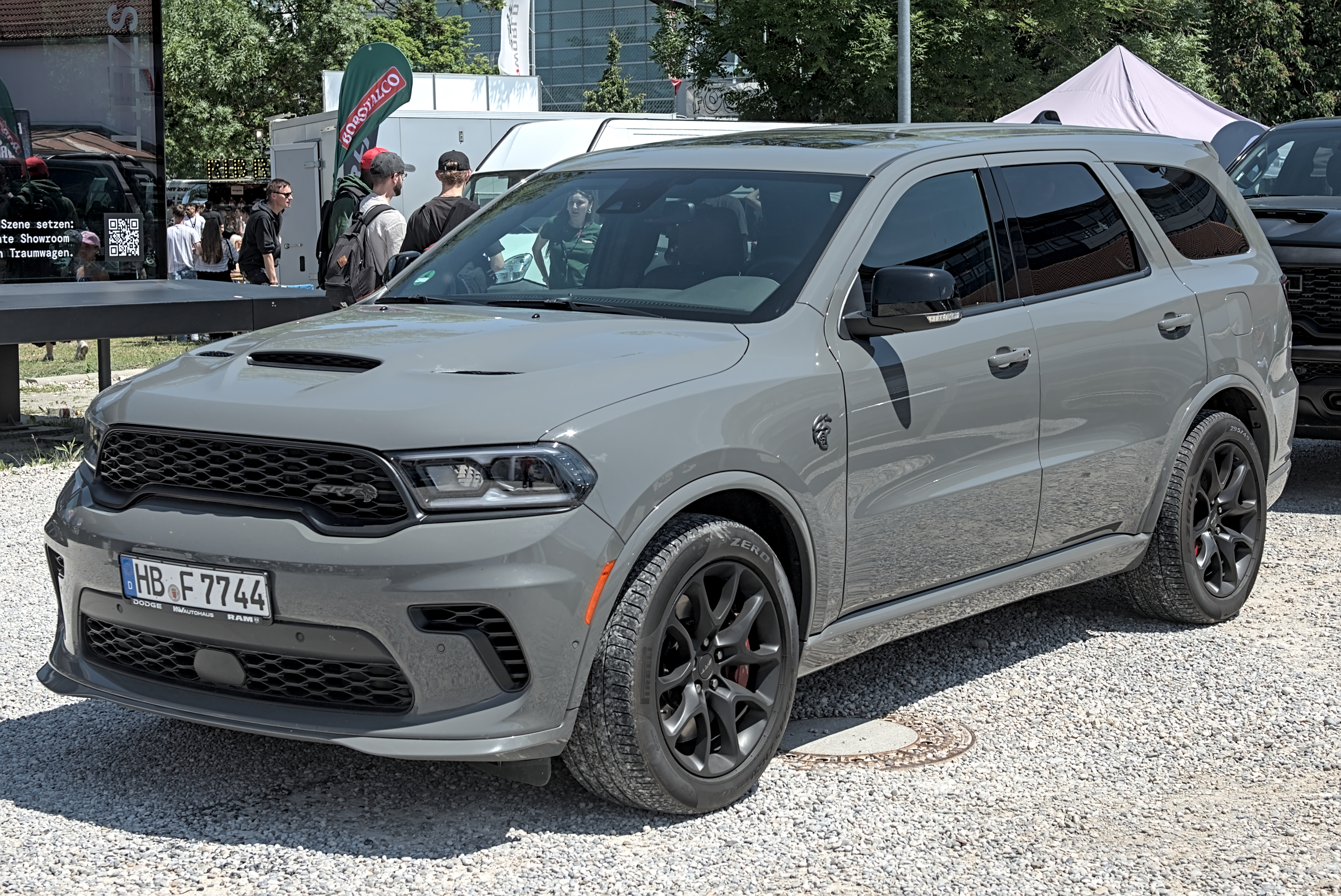
Dodge Durango

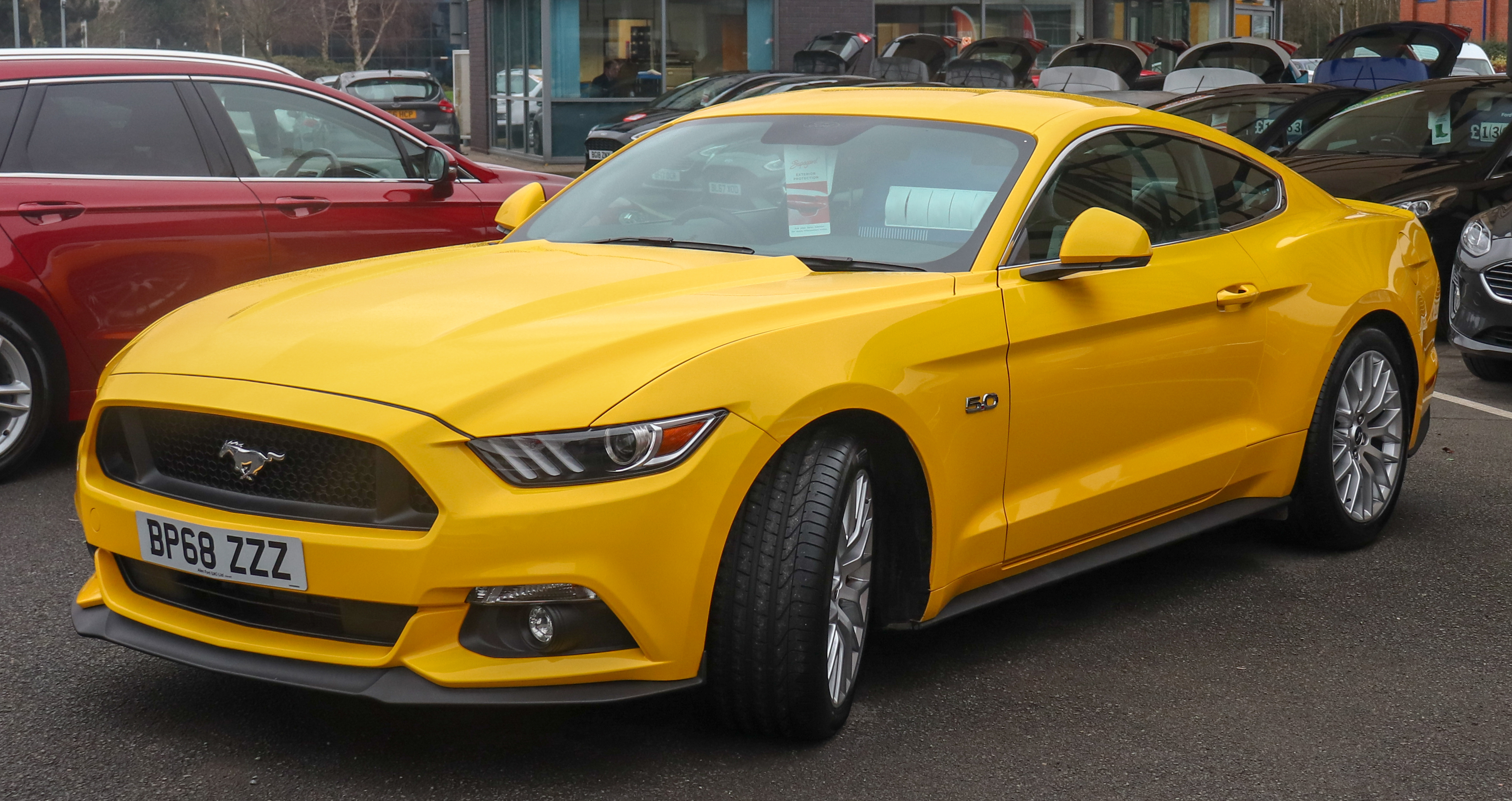
Ford Mustang

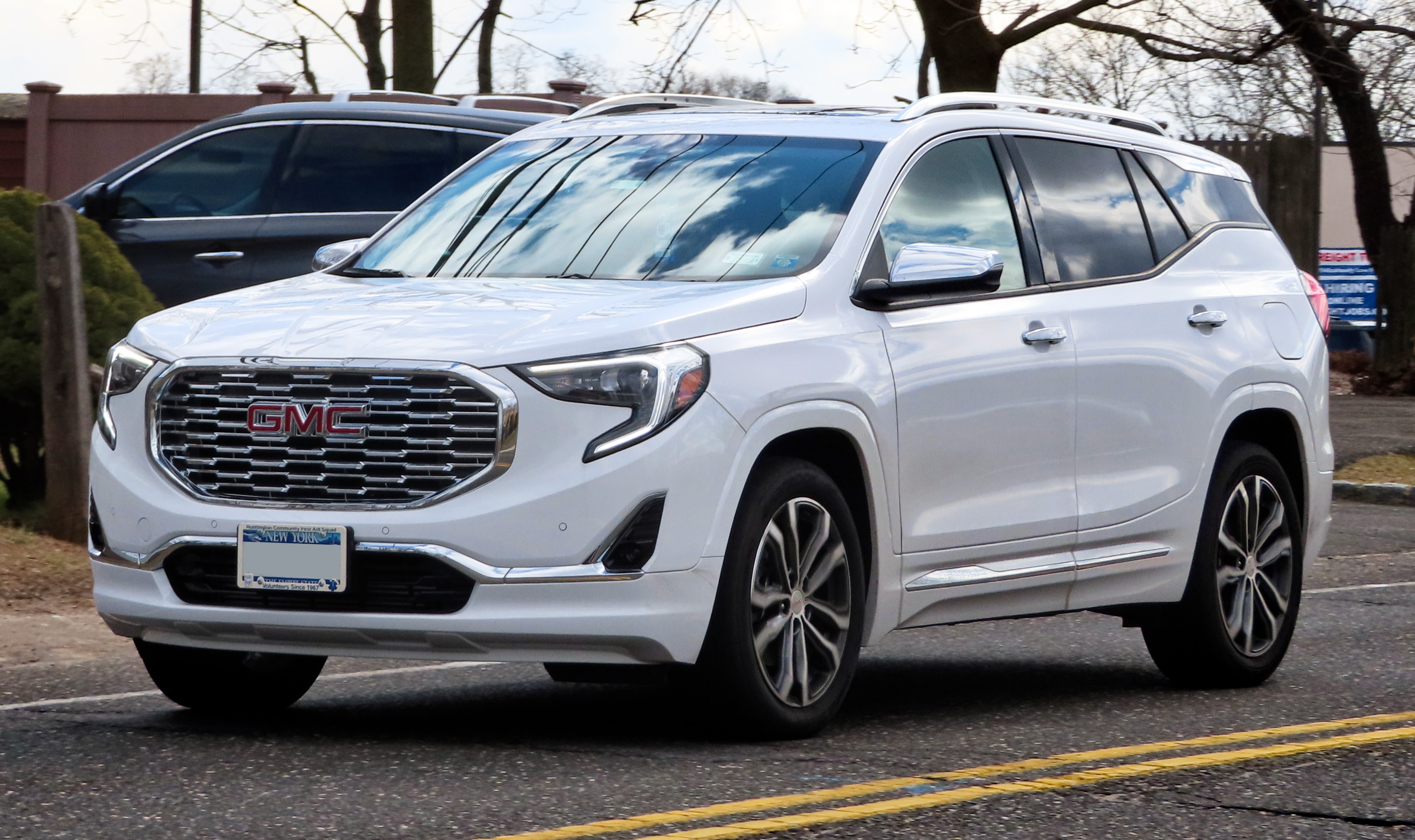
GMC Terrain

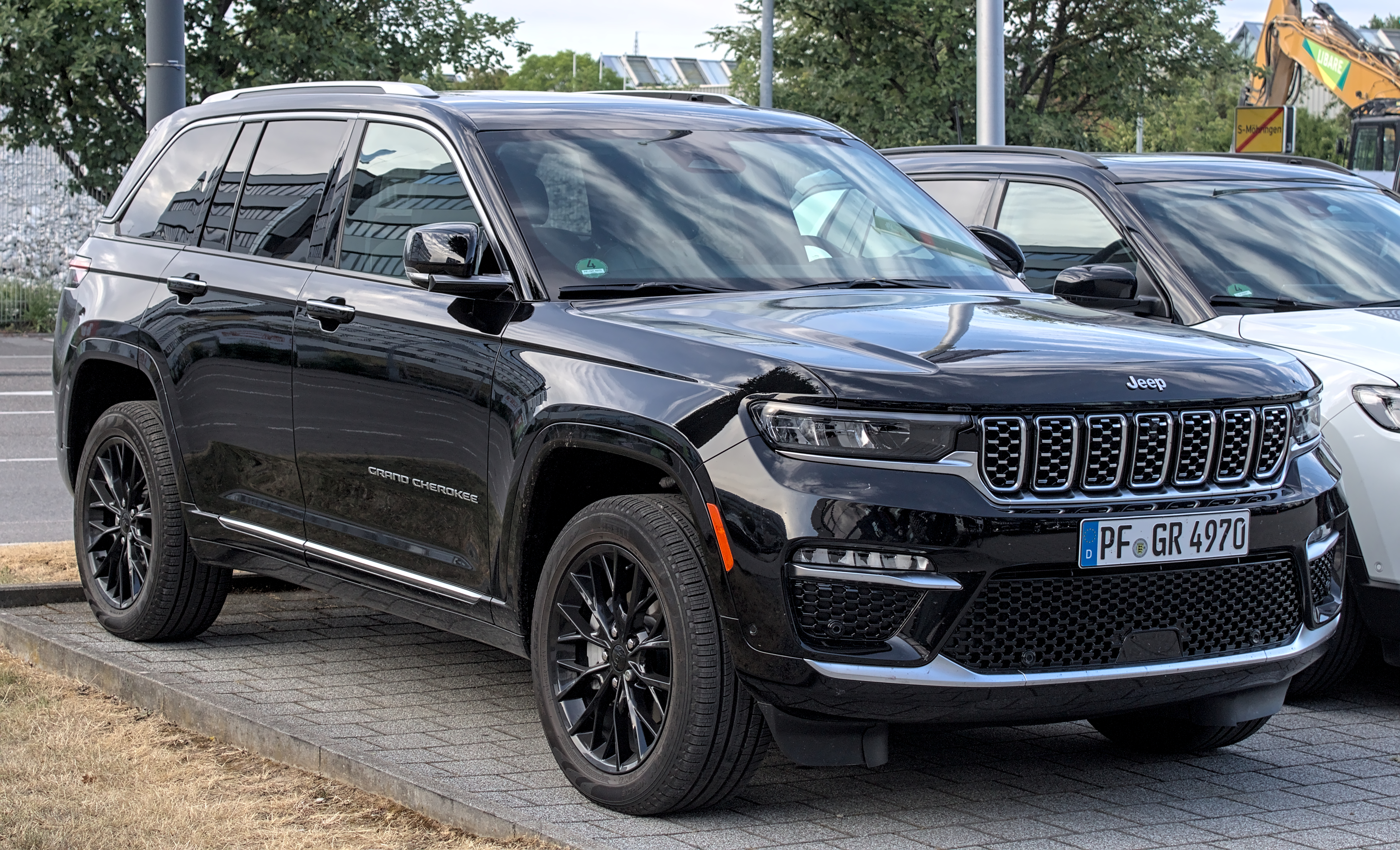
Jeep Grand Cherokee

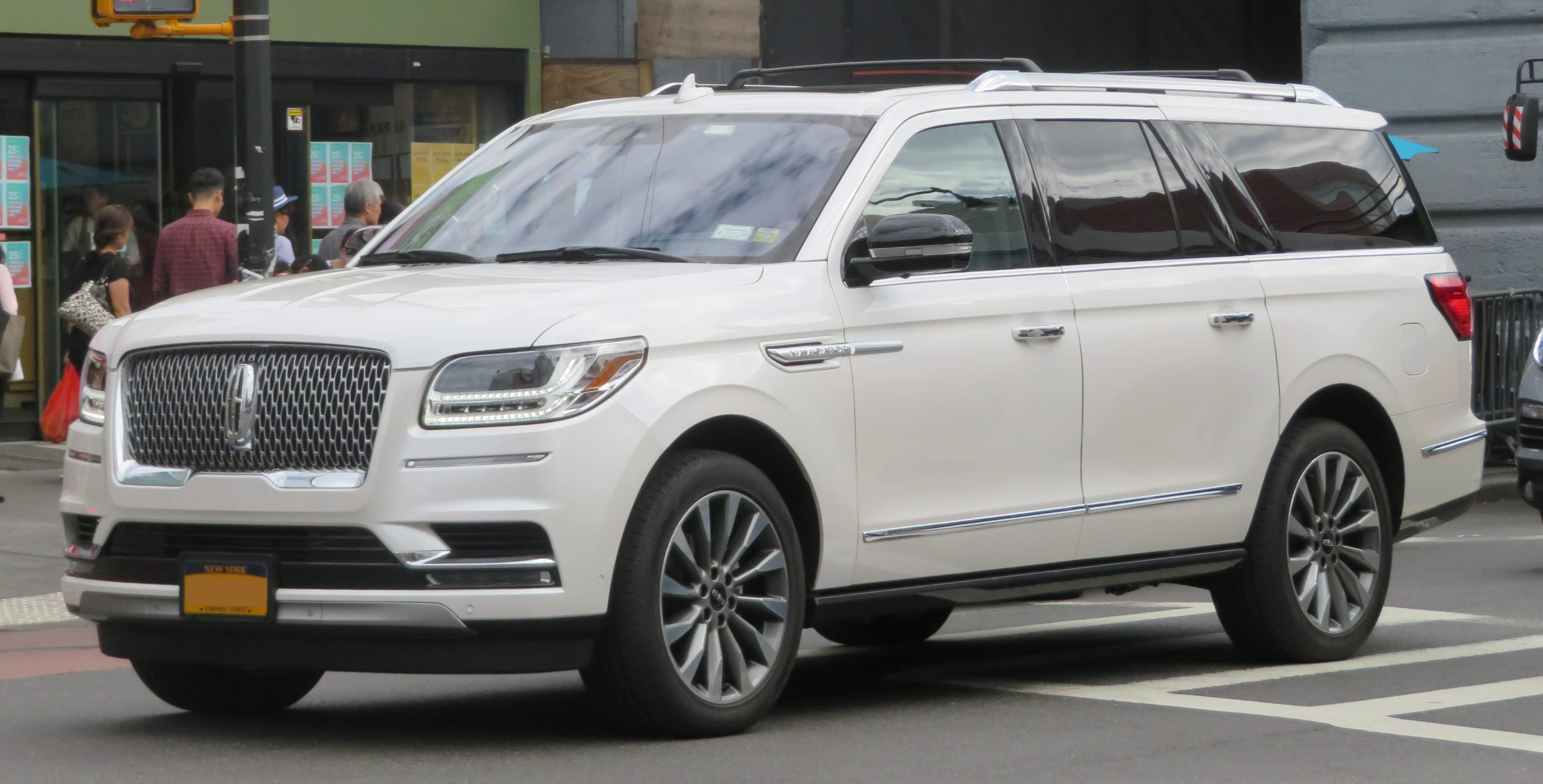
Lincoln Navigator

Tesla Model 3

=== Active ===
- Alpha Motor Corporation (2020–present)
- AM General (1971–present)
- Anteros (2005–present)
- Arcimoto (2007–present)
- Aurica (2010–present)
- Bollinger Motors (2014–present)
- Bremach (2009–present)
- Buick (1903–present)
- Callaway (1977–present)
- Cadillac (1902–present)
- Chevrolet (1911–present)
- Chrysler (1925–present)
- Czinger (2019–present)
- DeLorean Motor Company (1981–1983, 2022–present)
- Dodge (1900–present)
- Drako Motors (2013–present)
- Elio Motors (2009–present)
- Equus Automotive (2014–present)
- E-Z-GO (1954–present)
- Falcon (2009–present)
- Faraday (2014–present)
- Freightliner (1942–present)
- Ford (1903–present)
- General Motors (1908–present)
- GMC (1913–present)
- Hennessey (1991–present)
- Harley-Davidson (1901–present)
- Jeep (1941–present)
- Kenworth (1923–present)
- Karma (2016–present)
- Lincoln (1917–present)
- Lucid (2014–present)
- Lyons (2011–present)
- Mack (1902–present)
- Nu Ride Inc. (Lordstown until 2023.) (2018–present)
- Panoz (1989–present)
- Peterbilt (1939–present)
- Polaris (1954–present)
- Racefab (1991–present)
- RAESR (2014–present)
- Ram Trucks (2010–present)
- Rezvani (2014–present)
- Rivian (2009–present)
- Rossion (2007–present)
- Saleen (1980–present)
- Scuderia Cameron Glickenhaus
- Shelby American (1962–present)
- SSC (1999–present)
- Stellantis (2021–present)
- Tesla (2003–present)
- Trion Supercars (2012–present)
- Western Star (1967–present)
- Zimmer (1978–1988, 1997–present)

=== Former ===
- Ajax (1925–1926)
- AMC (1954–1987)
- American Simplex (1906–1910) (renamed to Amplex in 1910.)
- Amplex (1910–1915) <American Simplex>
- AMI (1946–1949)
- Auburn
- Canoo (2017-2025)
- Checker
- Coda (2009–2016)
- Cord
- Crosley
- DeSoto (1928–1960)
- Detroit Electric (1907–1939)
- Devon (2008–2013)
- Duesenberg
- Eagle (1987–1998)
- Edsel (1958–1960)
- Frazer
- Fisker (2011–2014)
- Geo (General Motors brand) (1989–1997)
- Hudson (1909–1957)
- Hummer (1992–2010; back as model of GMC since year 2022, Hummer EV)
- Hupmobile (1909–1939)
- Imperial (1955–1975, 1981–1983) (Chrysler Corporation brand – Imperial was also used as a Chrysler model name in certain other years.)
- Jordan
- Kaiser
- LaFayette
- LaSalle (1927–1940)
- Local (2007—2022)
- Marmon (1851–1933)
- Marquette (General Motors brand)
- Maxwell
- Mercer (1909–1925)
- Mercury (1938–2011)
- Merkur (1985–1989)
- Moon
- Mosler (1993–2013)
- Nash
- Navistar International
- Oakland (1908–1931)
- Oldsmobile (1897–2004)
- Packard (1899–1958)
- Plymouth (1928–2001)
- Pontiac (1926–2010)
- Rambler (1897–1914, 1958–1969)
- Saturn (1985–2010)
- Staver (1907–1914)
- Stearns-Knight
- Studebaker (1852–1967)
- Vector (1989–1993)
- Vehicle Production Group (2011–2013)
- Wheego (2009–2013)
- Willys (1908–1963)

== Uruguay ==
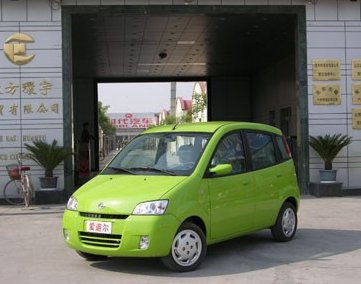
Effa Motors

=== Active ===
- Effa Motors

== Uzbekistan ==
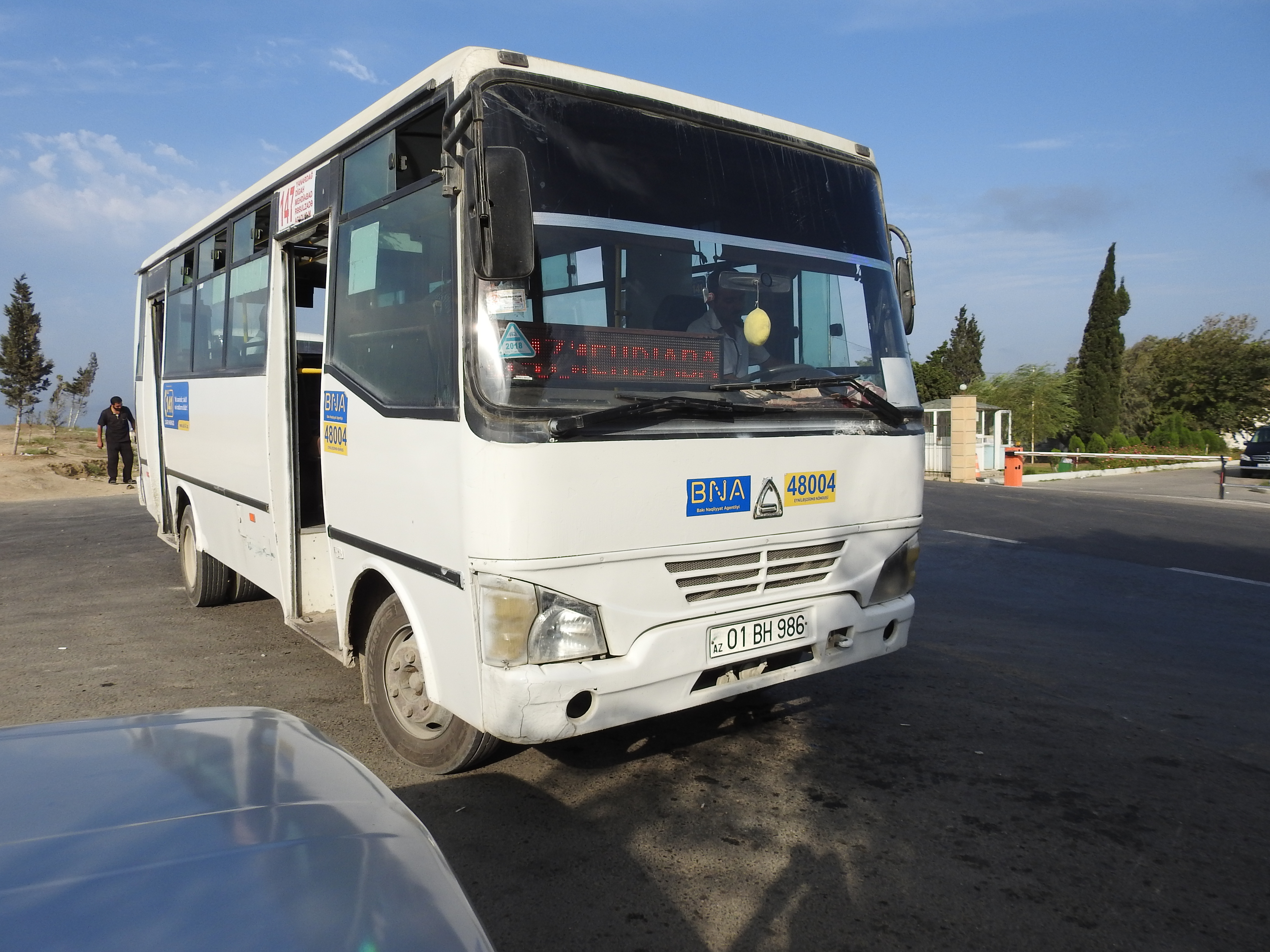
SAZ bus

- SamKochAvto
- UzAuto Motors

== Vietnam ==
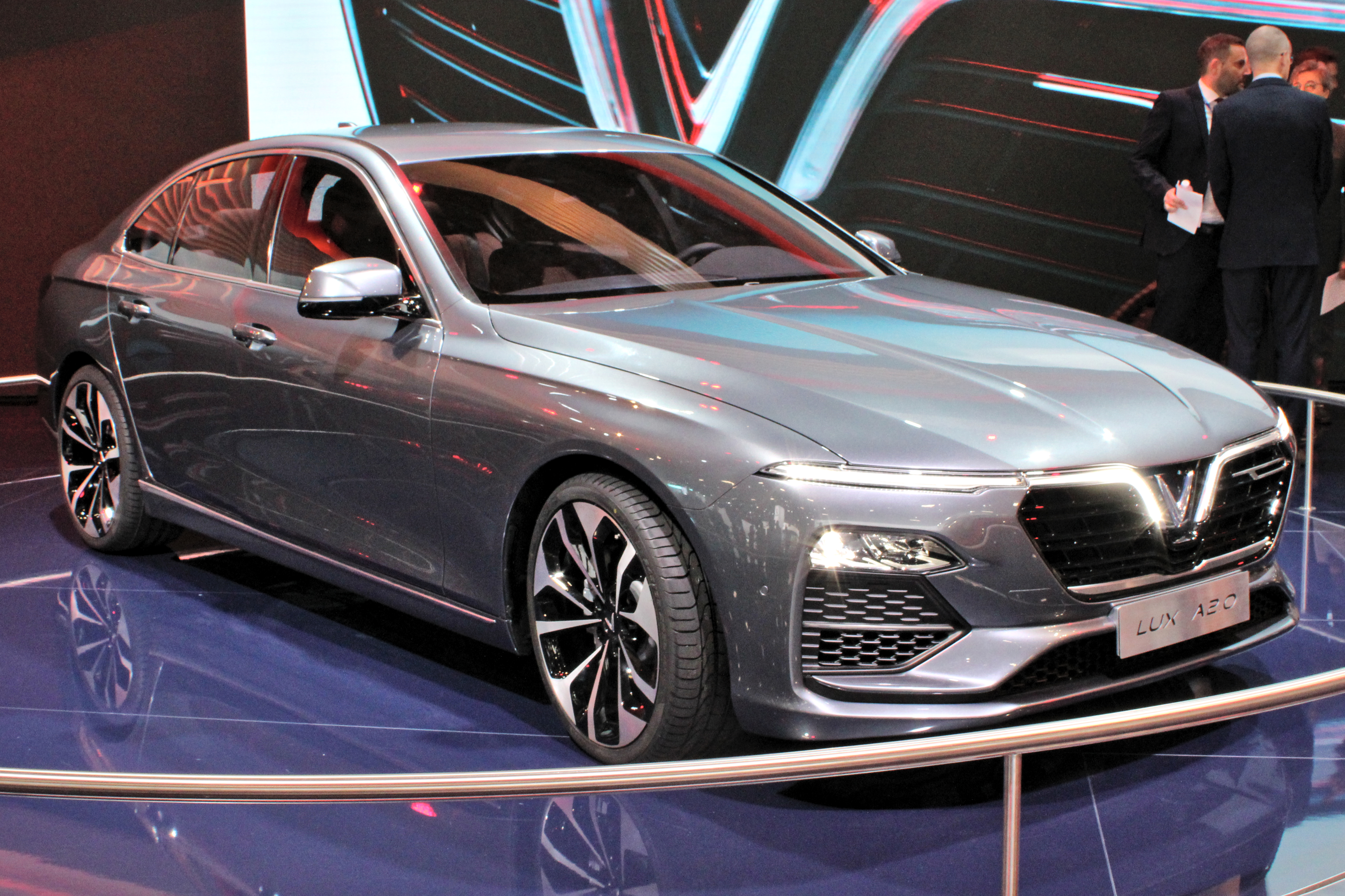
VinFast LUX A2.0

=== Active ===
- ChienThang
- THACO
- VinFast

=== Former ===
- Vinaxuki (2004–2015)

== See also ==
- List of automobile manufacturers
