= List of automobile manufacturers of Europe =

This is a list of European automobile manufacturers by country, with articles on Wikipedia. It is a subset of the list of automobile manufacturers for manufacturers based in European countries. It includes companies that are in business as well as defunct manufacturers.

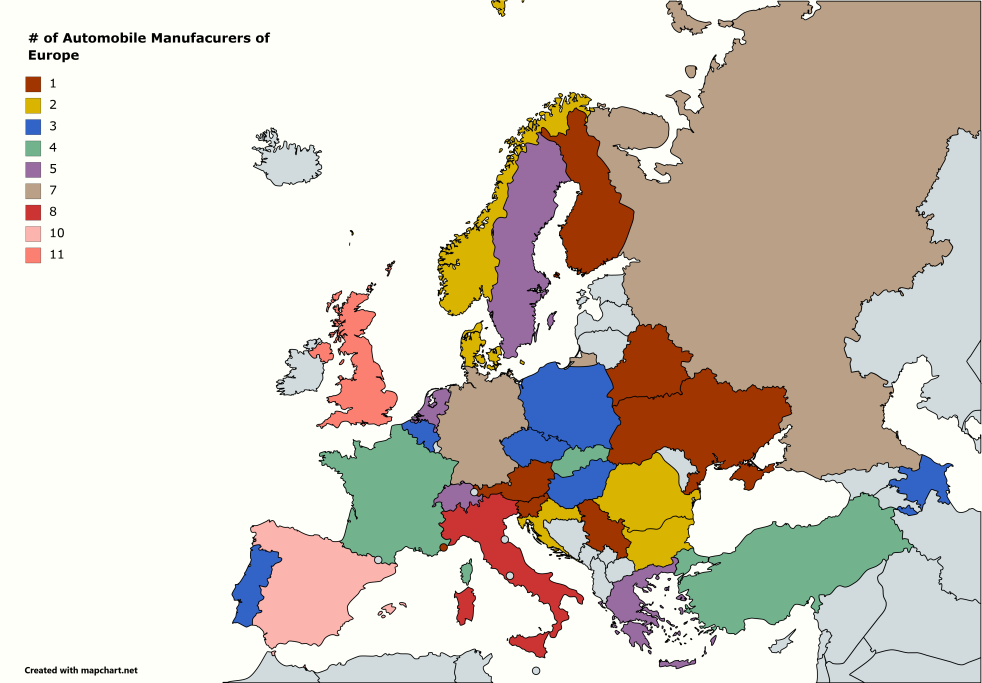
Number of automobile manufacturers in Europe

== International European brands ==
- Anglo-French
- Intrall - Russo-British
- Magomobil – Austro-Hungarian

== Austria ==
- Austro-Daimler (1899–1935)
- Austro-Tatra
- Custoca (also known as Custoka)
- Denzel
- Eurostar Automobilwerk
- Felber Autoroller
- Gräf & Stift
- Grofri
- KTM
- Libelle
- Lohner–Porsche (1900–1905)
- Magna Steyr
- Möve 101
- ÖAF
- Puch, Steyr automobile, Steyr Motors GmbH and Steyr-Daimler-Puch
- Rosenbauer
- Tushek&Spigel Supercars

== Belarus ==
- Amkodor
- BelAZ
- Belkommunmash
- GomSelMash
- GZLIN
- Lidagroprommash
- Minsk Automobile Plant
- MoAZ
- MTZ
- MZKT
- Neman
- Unison

== Belgium ==
- ADK (1922-1930)
- Alatac (1913-1914)
- ALP (1920)
- Antoine (1900-1903)
- Apal (1964-1998)
- Astra (1930)
- Auto-Mixte (1906-1912)
- Belga Rise (1928-1937)
- De Wandre (c. 1923)
- Delecroix (1899)
- Edran
- Exelsior (1903-1930)
- Flaid (1920-1921)
- FN (1899–1939)
- Gillet
- Impéria (1906-1948)
- Jeecy-Vea (1925-1926)
- Juwel (1923-1928)
- Meeussen (1955-1972)
- Métallurgique (1898–1928)
- Minerva (1902-1939)
- Nagant (1859-1931)
- Pieper (1899–1912)
- Pipe (1898–1914)
- Springuel (1907-1914)
- Van Hool
- Vivinus (1899–1914)

== Bosnia and Herzegovina ==
- Tvornica Automobila Sarajevo (TAS)

== Bulgaria ==
- Balcancar record
- Balkan
- BG Car
- Bulgarrenault (1966-1970)
- Bulgaralpine (1966-1970)
- Chavdar
- Kenta
- KTA Madara
- Litex Motors (2008-2017)
- Moskvitch Aleko (1966-1990)
- Pirin-Fiat (1967-1971)
- Preslav
- SIN
- Sofia

== Croatia ==
- DOK-ING
- Đuro Đaković
- Rimac
- TAZ
- Tomo Vinković

== Czechia ==
=== Active brands ===
- Avia (1919–present)
- Gordon (1997–present)
- Jawa (1929–present)
- Kaipan (1997–present)
- Hyundai Czech (2008–present)
- Karosa (1896–present (since 2007 IVECO BUS))
- MTX / Metalex (1969–present)
- Praga (1907–present)
- Škoda (1895–present)
- SOR Libchavy (1991–present)
- Tatra (1850–present)
- TEDOM (1991–present)
- TPCA (Toyota Peugeot Citroën Automobile Czech) (2002–present)
- Zetor (1946–present)
- Sigma motor (2017-present)

=== Former brands ===
- Aero (1929-1947)
- LIAZ (1951-2002)
- Velorex (1951-1971)
- Walter (1909-1954)
- RAF (Reichenberger Automobil Fabrik) (1907-1954)
- Wikov (1925–37)
- Zbrojovka Brno (1923–36)
- Rösler & Jauernig (1896-1908)
- Aspa (1924–25)
- Gatter (1926–37)
- Gnom (1921–24)
- Hakar
- ISIS (1922–24)
- KAN (1911–14)
- Premier (1913–14)
- Sibrava (1921–29)
- Start (1921–31)
- Stelka (1920-1922)
- Hoffmann & Novague (2014-2020)

== Denmark ==
- Alfgang (1912-1914)
- Anglo-Dane (1902-1917)
- Brems (1900-1904)
- Bukh & Gry (1904-1905)
- Dana (c. 1908-1914)
- Danish Automobile Building
- Dansk (1901-1908)
- DK (1950)
- Ellemobil (1909-1913)
- Gideon (1913-1920)
- Hammel (1887-1888)
- Houlberg (c. 1913-1921)
- Hydrema
- Kewet
- Thrige (1911-1918)
- Zenvo

== Estonia ==
- ESTfield
- Kavor Motorsport former Estonia Race Cars
- Tartu Autode Remondi Katsetehas (TARK, Tartu Cars' Repair Testing Factory)
- RexeR

== Finland ==
- Elcat
- Electric Raceabout (prototype, not in production)
- Finlandia (1922–1924)
- Korvensuu (1912–1913)
- Sisu Auto
- Valmet Automotive
- Vanaja (1943–1968)
- Valtra
- Veemax (racecar, 1960s–1978)
- Wiima

== France ==
- Aixam
- Alpine
- Bugatti
- Citroën
- Delage
- DS
- Ligier
- Peugeot
- Renault
- Renault Trucks

== Greece ==
- Alta (1968-1978)
- Attica (1958-1972)
- Autokinitoviomihania Ellados (1975-1984)
- Automeccanica (1980-1995)
- Balkania (1975-1995)
- BET (1965-1975)
- Biamax
- BIOMAN
- BIOMOT
- Bouhagier Patras
- C.AR (1970-1992)
- Diana
- DIM (1977-1982)
- ELBO
- Grezda (1969-1985)
- Hercules (1980-1983)
- Korres
- MEBEA (1960-1983)
- Motoemil
- NAMCO
- Neorion (1974-1975)
- Pan-Car (1968-1994)
- Replicar Hellas
- SAM
- Saracakis
- Scavas (1973-1992)
- Sfakianakis
- Styl Kar (1970)
- Sunnyclist
- Super Car
- Tangalakis (1935-1939)
- Thelogou (1918-1926)
- Tropical
- Tzen

== Hungary ==
- Alba Regia (1955)
- Balaton (1955)
- Borbála (1986-1990)
- Credo
- Csepel (1949-1996)
- Csonka (1909-1924)
- Fejes (1923-1932)
- Ha (1928-1929)
- Helix
- Ikarus
- MÁG (1911-1934)
- Magomobil
- Marta (1908-1922)
- Mávag (1938-1942)
- Méray (1923-1934)
- Phönix (1904-1912)
- Puli (1990-c.1997)
- Rába
- Unitas
- Úttörő (1954)
- Weiss-Manfréd (1927-1932)

== Ireland ==
- Alesbury (1907-1908)
- GAC Ireland (1980-1986)
- Shamrock
- TMC Costin

== Italy ==
- Fornasari (1999-2015)
- Lancia
- Fiat
- Iso
- Ferrari
- Alfa Romeo
- Maserati
- Lamborghini
- Abarth
- Autobianchi(1955|1995)
- Pagani

== Latvia ==
- Dartz
- FEM

== Lithuania ==
- KAG

== Liechtenstein ==
- Jehle (1977-1991)
- Orca Engineering

== North Macedonia ==
- Comsove
- Sanos

== Monaco ==
- Monte Carlo Automobile
- Venturi

== Netherlands ==
- Aerts (1899)
- Altena (1900-1906)
- Anderheggen (1899-1902)
- Bij 't Vuur (1902-1906)
- Brons (1907-2004)
- Burton
- Carver
- DAF
- Den Oudsten
- Donkervoort
- Entrop (1909)
- Eysink (1903-1919)
- Hillen (c.1913)
- GINAF
- Ruska
- Shelter (1956)
- Spyker (1880-1926)
- Spyker cars
- Spijkstaal
- Terberg
- United bus (1989-1993)
- Van Gink
- Vandenbrink
- VDL
- Vencer
- Waaijenberg

== Norway ==
- Bjering (1918-1920)
- Buddy
- C. Geijer
- Clarin Mustad (1917-1918)
- FYK
- Høka
- Moxy
- Norsk (1907-1911)
- Strømmens Værksted
- Think (1991-2011)
- Troll (1956-1958)

== Poland ==
- Arrinera (2008–present)
- AMZ-Kutno
- Autosan
- CWS (1918-1931)
- Fiat Auto Poland-Polski Fiat
- FSC
- FSM (1971-1992)
- FSO
- FSR
- Jelcz
- Kapena
- Leopard (2005–present)
- LRL
- Melex
- Mikrus (1957-1960)
- PZInż. (1928-1939)
- Ralf-Stetysz
- San (1967-1974)
- Smyk
- Solaris
- Solbus
- Ursus
- ZSD

== Portugal ==
- Bravia
- Edfor
- Entreposto
- Marlei
- Oceantia
- Salvador Caetano
- UMM (União Metalo-Mecânica)
- Vinci

== Romania ==
- AA&WF
- Astra
- ARO (1957-2006)
- C&I Eurotrans XXI
- Craiova
- DAC
- Dacia
- El Car
- Grivița
- M.R.
- Malaxa (1945)
- Oltcit
- Rocar (1951-2002)
- Roman
- ROMLOC
- Uzinele Braşov

== Russia ==
- A Level
- Altay
- Amur (1967-2012)
- Avtokad (2000–present)
- AZLK/Moskvitch
- Bronto (1993–present)
- Derways (2006–present)
- Doninvest (1991-2014(?))
- Dragon
- EL Motors (1997–present)
- GAZ/Volga
- GolAZ
- IZH
- KAvZ
- KIM (1930-1947)
- Lessner (1904-1909)
- Marussia (2007-2014)
- Nami (1927)
- NefAZ
- PAZ
- SeAZ
- Silant
- Sollers JSC
- TagAZ
- Torgmash
- UAZ
- UralAZ
- VAZ/Lada (1970–present)
- VIS
- Volgabus
- ZIL (1958–present)
- ZIS (1936-1958)

== Serbia ==
- FAP
- FVK
- Globus-auto
- IDA-Opel
- Ikarbus
- IMR
- IMT
- Neobus
- FCA Serbia
- Zastava Special Automobiles
- Zastava TERVO
- Zastava Trucks
- Zastava/Yugo

== Slovakia ==
- BAZ
- K-1 Engineering
- TAZ (1973-1999)

== Slovenia ==
- Adria Mobil
- Avtomontaža
- CIMOS
- IMV
- REVOZ
- Shayton
- Sistemska tehnika
  - Valuk
  - Krpan 8x8
- TAM-Durabus
- Tovarna avtomobilov Maribor
- Tomos
- Tushek
  - Renovatio T500

== Spain ==
- AFA
- America
- Anglada
- Avia
- Ayats
- Barreiros
- Beulas
- Biscúter
- Cupra
- David
- Ebro
- Elizalde
- ENASA
- Eucort
- GTA Motor
- Hispano Suiza
- Hurtan
- IFR
- Indcar
- Irizar
- Izaro
- Kapi
- La Cuadra
- Nogebus
- Pegaso
- Santana Motor
- SEAT
- Tauro Sport Auto
- Tramontana
- URO
- UROVESA

== Sweden ==
- Caresto
- Koenigsegg
- Polestar
- Saab
- Scania
- Volvo

== Switzerland ==
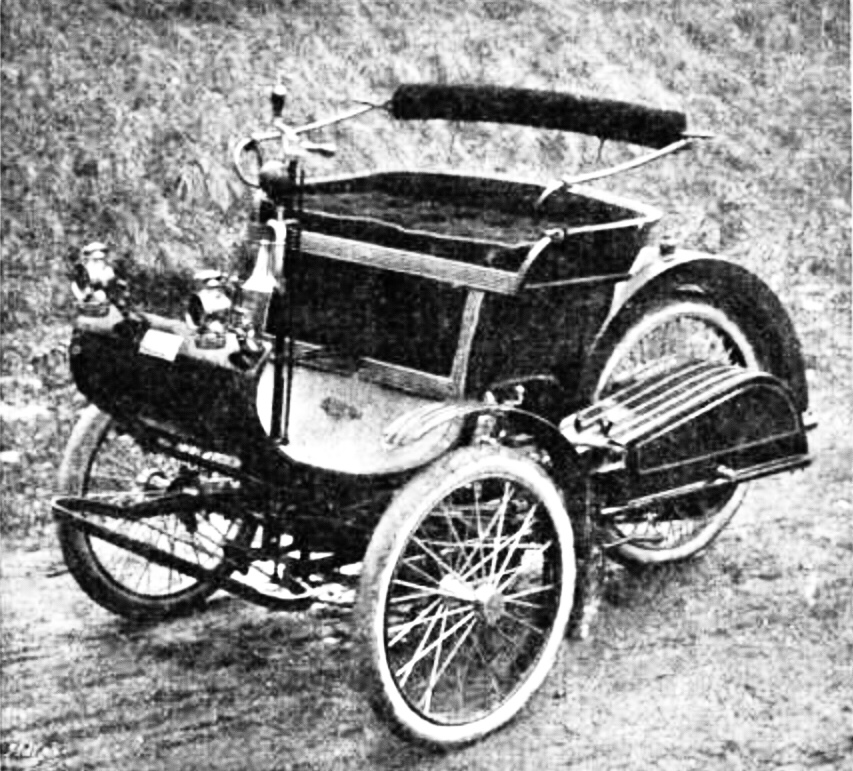
Grisard (1899)

- Ajax (1906-1910)
- Albar
- Carrosserie Hess
- Cree SAM
- Dufaux (1904-1907)
- Enzmann
- FBW
- Grisard (1899)
- Leblanc
- Martini (1897-1934)
- Maximag (1923-1927)
- Monteverdi (1967-1984)
- Mowag
- NanoFlowcell
- Pic-Pic (1906-1924)
- Rinspeed
- Sbarro
- Saurer (1903-1982)
- Tribelhorn (1902-1920)
- Turicum (1904-1912)
- Yaxa (1912-1914)
- Zédel (1901-1905)

== Turkey ==
- BMC
- Otokar
- Togg

== Ukraine ==
- AntoRus
- Bogdan Corporation
  - LuAZ
- Etalon Corporation
  - BAZ
  - ChAZ
- Stryi-Avto
- Eurocar
- HalAZ
- Iveco Motor Sich
  - VEPR
- KrASZ
- Torsus
- ZAZ

== United Kingdom ==
- AC Cars
- Aston Martin
- Bentley
- Breckland Technologies
- Caterham Cars
- David Brown
- Elemental Cars
- Elva (car manufacturer)
- Foden Trucks
- Ginetta
- Hillman
- Invicta (car)
- Jaguar Cars
- Keating Supercars
- Land Rover
- Lotus Cars
- McLaren
- MG Cars
- Mini
- Noble Automotive
- Prodrive
- Radical
- Rover Company
- Singer Motors
- TVR
- Vauxhall Motors
- Zenos Cars

== Sources ==
- Nick Georgano, (Ed.). The Beaulieu Encyclopedia of the Automobile. Chicago: Fitzroy Dearborn, 2000. ISBN 1-57958-293-1
- Mazur, Eligiusz (Ed.). World of Cars 2006/2007: Worldwide Car Catalogue. Warsaw: Media Connection, 2006. ISSN 1734-2945

== See also ==
- List of automobile manufacturers
- List of automobile marques
- List of motorcycle manufacturers
- List of truck manufacturers
