= Ruska =

Ruska may refer to:

== Places ==
=== Slovak villages ===
- Ruská
- Ruská Bystrá
- Ruská Kajňa
- Ruská Poruba
- Ruská Voľa
- Ruská Volová
- Ruská Nová Ves

=== Other ===
- Rava-Ruska, a city in Ukraine
- Ruska Bela, a city in Bulgaria
- Ruska, a village in Seliatyn, Chernivtsi Oblast, Ukraine

== Other uses ==
- Ruska (surname)
- Ruska (grape), another name for the wine grape Gewürztraminer
- Pogoń Ruska coat of arms
- A song by the Finnish band Apocalyptica
- Ruska (car), a Dutch manufacturer of automobile
