= List of microcars by country of origin: H =

== List ==
Country	Automobile Name	Manufacturer	Engine Make/Capacity	Seats	Year	Other information
Hungary	Alba Regia	Székesfehérvári Motorjavitó Vállalat, Székesfehérvár	Pannonia 250 cc	2	1956	Prototype constructed for the Hungarian Ministry of Metallurgy and Machine Industry
Hungary	Balaton	Székesfehérvári Motorjavitó Vállalat, Székesfehérvár	Pannonia 250 cc	2	1956	Prototype constructed for the Hungarian Ministry of Metallurgy and Machine Industry
Hungary	Puli					
Hungary	Úttörô	Locksmith and Iron Foundry Company, Debrecen	Csepel 250 cc	2	1954	Prototype constructed for the Hungarian Ministry of Light Industry
