= Hillen =

Hillen may refer to:

- Hillen (surname), a surname
- Hillen, Baltimore, a neighborhood of Baltimore, Maryland, United States
- Hillen (automobile), a Dutch automobile
