= Theologou =

Defunct Greek vehicle manufacturer

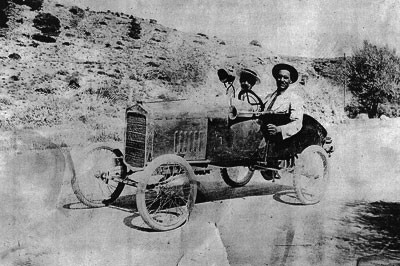
Theologou light car (ca.1916)

Theologou was one of the first vehicle manufacturers in Greece. It was created by Nikos Theologos, a Greek mechanic who had lived and worked for a few years in the US, and founded this company after he returned to Athens, Greece in 1906 (full name appearing on vehicle badges was "N. Theologou", "Theologou" being genitive case in Greek, meaning "by Theologos") . Around 1916 he designed and constructed a light passenger car (chassis and body) with a motorcycle engine; according to his descendants, the efforts had started in 1908, and since 1916 a small number (less than 10) were built. His company, nonetheless, produced a variety of bus and truck bodies, mostly on Ford chassis in the 1920s. By the late 1920s it was facing strong competition by larger companies like Tournikiotis and Athena in Athens, Bouhagier in Patras and others, which also produced vehicles (mainly buses and trucks) on imported chassis, and was soon eclipsed by them.
