= Praetorian =

Praetorian is an adjective derived from the ancient Roman office of praetor. It may refer to:

== Government and military ==
- Legatus (Praetorian legate), the title of a high military rank in the Roman Empire
- Praetorian Guard, a special force of skilled and celebrated troops serving as the personal guard of Roman Emperors
- Praetorian prefect, the title of a high office in the Roman Empire
- Praetorian DASS, the Defensive Aid Sub-System for the Eurofighter Typhoon aircraft

== Places ==
- Praetorian prefecture, the largest administrative division of the late Roman Empire, above the mid-level dioceses and the low-level provinces
  - Praetorian prefecture of Africa, division of the Eastern Roman Empire established after the reconquest of northwestern Africa from the Vandals
  - Praetorian prefecture of Gaul, included Gaul, Upper and Lower Germany, Roman Britain, Spain and Mauretania Tingitana in Africa
  - Praetorian prefecture of Illyricum, included, in its greatest expanse, Pannonia, Noricum, Crete and most of the Balkan peninsula except Thrace
  - Praetorian prefecture of Italy, included the Italian peninsula, the Western Balkans, the Danubian provinces and parts of North Africa
  - Praetorian prefecture of the East, included the larger part of the Eastern Roman Empire

== Arts, entertainment, and media ==
- Praetorians (album), a 2008 black metal album by Naer Mataron
- Praetorians (video game), a 2003 real-time strategy computer game
- The Praetorian, a newspaper at the University of California, Riverside
- Praetorian (novel), book by Simon Scarrow

=== Characters ===
- Praetorians are the primary antagonist group in The Net, 1995 film featuring Sandra Bullock
- Praetorian, a rank in the Mad Max franchise held by Jack and Furiosa amongst others
- Glyphid Praetorian, an acid-spitting creature in the cooperative first-person shooter video game Deep Rock Galactic

== Buildings ==
- Praetorian Building, one of the first high-rise buildings to be constructed in Dallas, Texas
- Praetorian Palace, a 14th-century Venetian palace in the city of Koper, Slovenia

== Other uses ==
- Pax Praetoriana, the relative stability of modern South Africa and its encouragement of democratic governments in other African states
- Praetorians Roma, an Italian rugby union team scheduled to begin play in the Magners League in 2010
- Torsus Praetorian, a 4x4 off-road bus from Ukraine
- SS Pretorian, steamship ocean liner for the Allan Line

== See also ==
- Propraetor
- Praetor
