= Ruuska =

Ruuska is a Finnish surname. Notable people with the surname include:

- Sylvia Ruuska (1942–2019), American competition swimmer
- Lauri Ruuska (born 1993), professional golfer

== See also ==
- Ruska (surname)
