= Alba Regia (disambiguation) =

Alba Regia is the Latin name of the Hungarian city of Székesfehérvár.

Alba Regia may also refer to:

- Alba Regia (car), Hungarian microcar project of the 1950s
- 111468 Alba Regia, main-belt asteroid
- Alba Regia (film), a 1961 Hungarian film
