= Balaton =

Lake Balaton is a lake in Hungary, the largest lake in Central Europe.

Balaton may also refer to:

- 2242 Balaton, a main-belt asteroid
- Balaton (car), a Hungarian microcar
- Balaton (village), in Heves county, Hungary
- Balaton, Minnesota, a city in the US
- Balaton cheese, a type of Hungarian semi-hard cheese made from cow's milk
- Balaton cherry
- Principality of Lower Pannonia or Balaton Principality (c. 839–901), a Slavic state
