= Emporiki =

Emporiki may refer to:

- Emporiki Bank, a Greek bank with headquarters in Athens
- Emporiki Autokiniton was a major Greek automobile trading and industrial company
