= List of current automotive parts suppliers =

For other automobile manufacturing related lists, see See also

This is a list of current automotive parts suppliers, arranged in alphabetical order. The year of foundation is shown in brackets.

== A ==
- Autobacs Seven (1947)
- Automotive Lighting (1999)
- Axon (2005)

== B ==
- BBS (1970)
- Bilstein (1873)
- Bosch (1886)
- Brano Group (1862)

== C ==
- Comau (1973)

== D ==
- Dinan (1979)

== E ==
- Factory Five (1995)

== H ==
- Hoesch (1871)
- HKS (1973)

== I ==
- Impul (1980)
- Intrepid (1991)
- ISA (1980)

== K ==
- Katech (1977)

== L ==
- Laboratorio
- Locust
- Loremo (2000)

== M ==
- Magna (1957)
- Magneti Marelli (1919)
- Mamerow (1982)
- Mazel(1987)
- Mecachrome (1937)
- Mobsteel
- Mopar (1937)
- Motrio (1998)
- Mr. Norm's (1948)
- Multimatic (1984)

== N ==
- nanoFlowcell (2013)
- Napier (1990)
- Novitec (1989)

== O ==
- OnlineMetals.com (1998)

== R ==
- Rieter (1795)

== P ==
- Paxton (1937)

== T ==
- ThyssenKrupp (1999)

== See also ==
- List of automobile manufacturers
- List of automobile marques
- List of current automobile manufacturers by country
- Timeline of motor vehicle brands
- Automotive industry in the United Kingdom
- List of car manufacturers of the United Kingdom
- List of Asian automobile manufacturers
- List of Eastern European automobiles
- List of Western European automobile manufacturers
