= Houlberg (car) =

Danish car

Houlberg was the name of a light touring car built by Christian Houlberg in Odense, Denmark, between 1913 and 1920. The car had a 4-cylinder Ballot engine. A modified "sports" version was also offered.
