= Jeecy-Vea =

The Jeecy-Vea was a Belgian automobile manufactured from 1925 until 1926 by a company more famous for its motor cycles. A limited-production light car, it was manufactured by a motorcycle factory in Brussels, and featured a 750 cc Coventry-Climax flat-twin engine. Tourer and coupé bodied versions were advertised.
