= Econoom =

The Econoom was a Dutch automobile manufactured from 1913 until 1915. Only 85 vehicles, all light cars, were produced by the Amsterdam firm of Hautekeet & Van Asselt; they used Ballot engines and a MAB chassis, all imported from France.
