= Ferdinant Anderheggen =

Dutch automobile manufacturer (1866–1931)

Ferdinant Anderheggen (20 April 1866 – 30 August 1931) was a Dutch automobile constructor from Roermond who produced a number of models under the Anderheggen brand.

Before trying his luck in the new automobile industry, Anderheggen was active as a competitive cyclist. In 1899 he successfully constructed an automobile, soon followed by a second model. The construction of automobiles went so well that Anderheggen negotiated with a French automobile manufacturer for the manufacturing of his creations. Eventually this failed and instead in 1901 he joined forces with machine factory P. Konings, that helped him manufacture a third car.
