= Yaxa =

Swiss Automobile

The Yaxa was a Swiss automobile produced from 1912 until 1914. Its name was a phonetic rendering of the phrase Y a que ça ("It's the only one there is"). Of Genevan manufacture, the car was built by Charles Bahni, an early collaborator of Charles-Edouard Henriod. The Yaxa was a 1692 cc light car which used a four-cylinder Zedel engine; among its other touches were central gear and brake levers. Baehni drove a Yaxa to victory in the 1913 Coupe de la Gruyère; nevertheless, the marque folded a year later.
