= Flaid =

Belgian automobile manufacturer

The Flaid was a Belgian automobile manufactured from 1920 until 1921 in Liège. A 10/12 hp light car with 1095 cc four-cylinder engine, it was designed for export to Britain. A stand was booked at the 1920 British Motor Show but the car never appeared.
