= Anderheggen =

The Anderheggen was a Dutch automobile; the short-lived light 4hp four-seater vis-à-vis, powered by a water-cooled Abeille engine, was manufactured in Amsterdam from 1899 to 1902. Its transmission was a flat belt from the engine to a system of fast and loose pulleys giving two speeds. Total production was fewer than 10 cars.

The car was built by Ferdinant Anderheggen, a former cyclist, who later worked for Konings. Negotiations with a French manufacturer in Swalmen, Limburg, (probably Abeille) didn't work out.
