= Norsk (marque) =

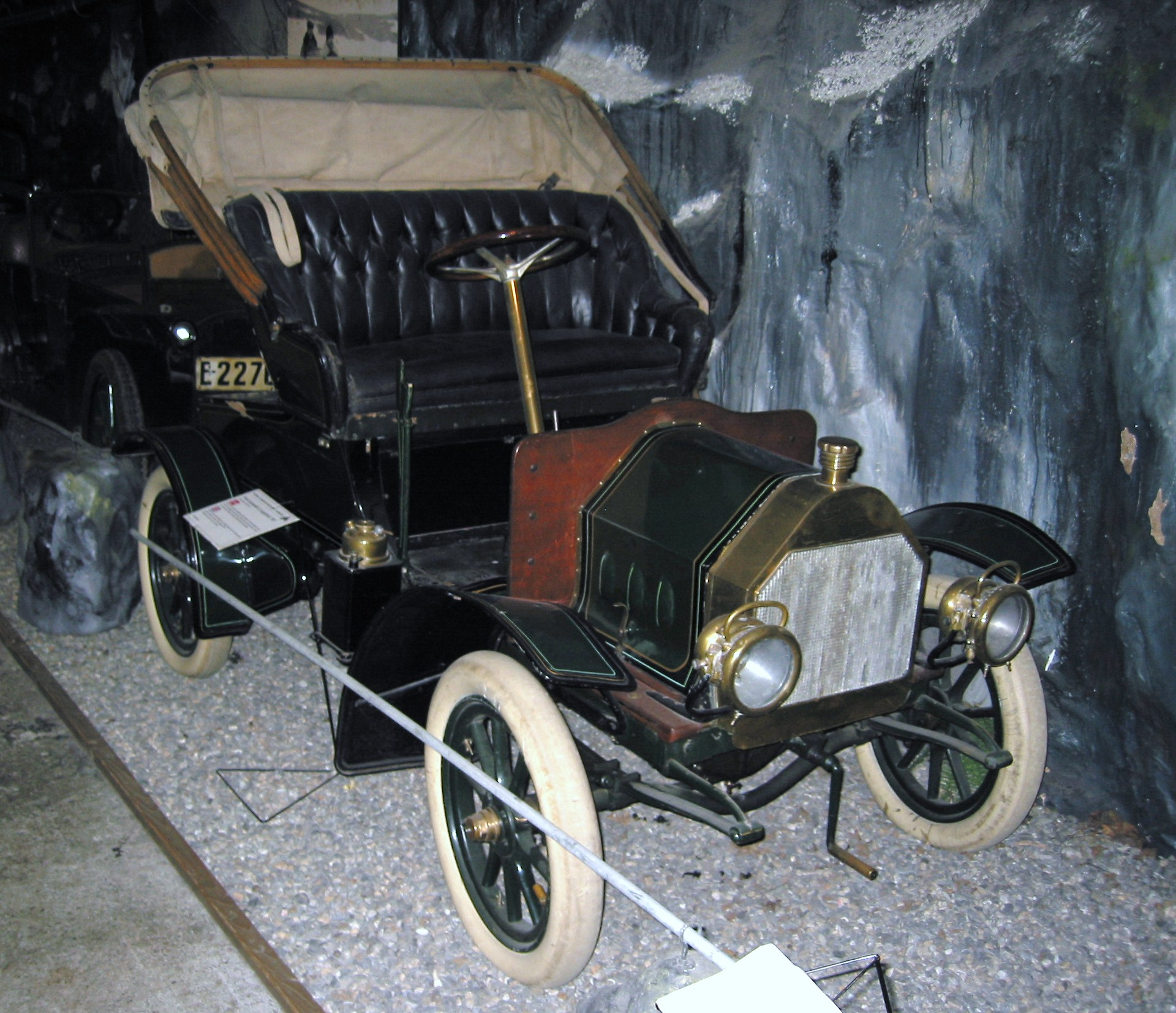
Norsk Car (1907)

Norsk was the brand name of cars built by Norsk Automobil & Vagnfabrik AS in Oslo, Norway between 1908 and 1911. Models produced included a small automobile with a single-cylinder 8 hp engine and a heavier touring car with 4-cylinder engine. A total of around 10 cars were built.
