= De Wandre =

Albert Dewandre (1884-1964) was a Belgian automobile inventor

The De Wandre was a Belgian automobile manufactured around 1923. Called "the elegant spider", it was a wire-wheeled sports car using the chassis and running gear of the Model T Ford.

== See also ==
- Delecroix, first build in 1897, and commercialised in 1898
