= C.AR (automobiles) =

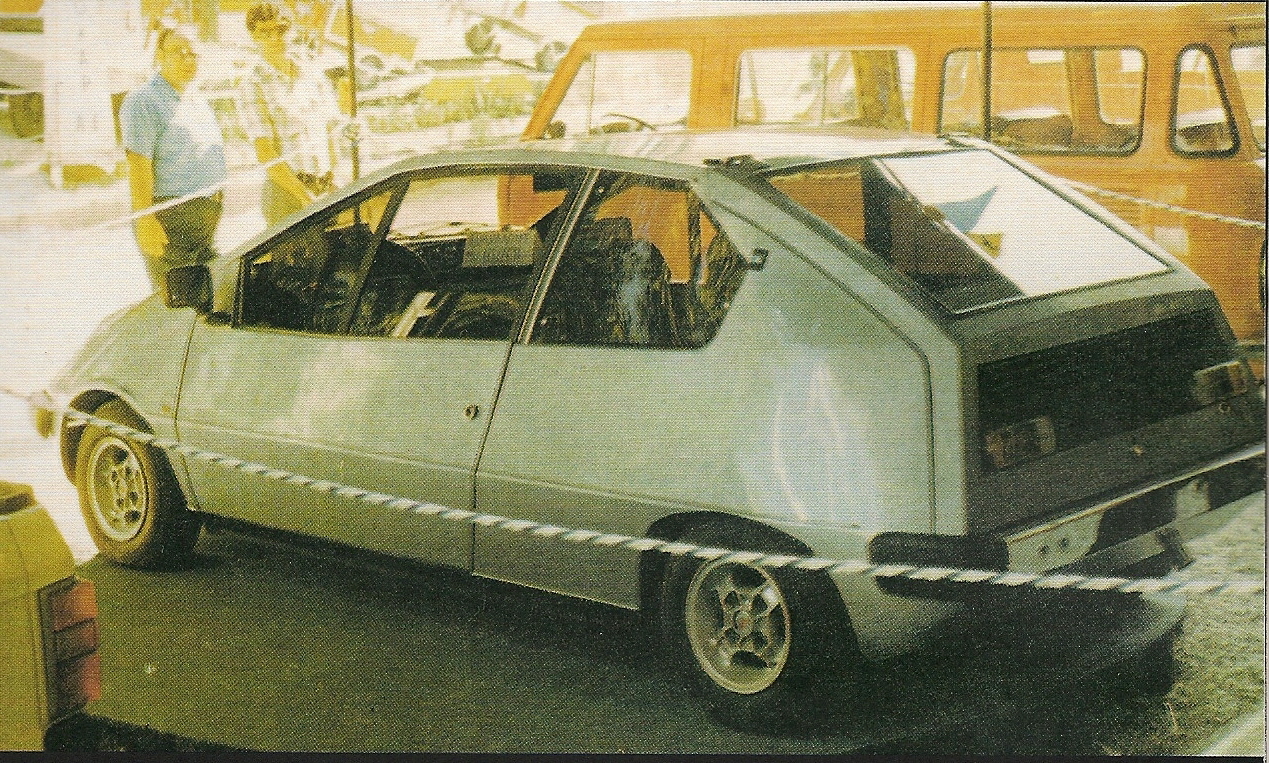
The 1976 Arco (C.AR) Iaspis was supposed to feature engineering innovations and combine "family" with "sports" character; however, it was an uninspired design, and its production was considered too risky.

C.AR was a Greek automotive company, founded in 1970. Originally it was called ARCO, both names being formed from the name of its founder, Constantinos Argyriadis, an engineer and architect. With its headquarters in Thessaloniki and a well-equipped factory in Kilkis it concentrated on design and development of automobiles and related technologies, including composite materials, novel suspension and brake designs, electric vehicles, etc. None of its vehicles, though, entered production and thus this company represents an odd case of personal vision and persistence with catastrophic financial results.

Its first project, the NP903Y incorporating novel applications resulted in the Iaspis sports car introduced in 1976. The car was presented in the Thessaloniki annual Trade Fair but its production was cancelled due to high costs involved and poor market prospects. A redesigned, improved sports car, the Kalliston I was introduced in 1984 but it also remained a prototype. C.AR then focused on an entirely new concept, developing a microcar with a 280 cc Kubota engine. Development was based on an earlier (1981) C.AR test construction and the car was finally introduced in 1991. With a length of just 2.25 m, a maximum speed of 90 km/h and seating up to 4 people, the Baby-Car (as the model was named) would be, according to Mr. Argyriadis, an ideal city car. The company had already invested in its production when the project was cancelled due to financial limitations, forcing C.AR out of business.
