= Ruská Voľa =

- Municipality
- Flag

- Location of Ruská Voľa in the Prešov Region Location of Ruská Voľa in Slovakia
- Coordinates: 49.10°N 21.59°E
- Country: Slovakia
- Region: Prešov Region
- District: Vranov nad Topľou District
- First mentioned: 1357

Area
  - Total: 6.18 km^{2} (2.39 sq mi)
- Elevation: 282 m (925 ft)

Population (2025)
  - Total: 90
- Time zone: UTC+1 (CET)
  - Summer (DST): UTC+2 (CEST)
- Postal code: 943 1
- Area code: +421 54
- Vehicle registration plate (until 2022): VT
- Website: www.ruskavola.sk

Ruská Voľa (Hungarian: Kisszabados, until 1899: Orosz-Volya; Ukrainian: Руська Воля, romanized: Rus’ka Volia) is a village and municipality in Vranov nad Topľou District in the Prešov Region of eastern Slovakia.

== History ==
In historical records the village was first mentioned in 1357. Other names of the municipality: 1588 Nowawolya, Volya, 1635 Volya, noviter sicata, 1773 Ruska Wolya, Orosz-Volya, 1786 Orosz Wolya, 1808 Orosz-Alsó-Vólya et Orosz Felso-Volya, Ruská Wola, 1863 Oroszvolya, 1907 Poprádokros, 1920 Ruská Voľa, 1960 Ruská Voľa, in Hungarian Poprádokros

== Geography ==
The municipality lies at an altitude of 282 metres (925 ft) and covers an area of 6.18 km^{2} (2.39 sq mi) (2025).

== Population ==
Population statistic (10 years)
Year	1995	2005	2015	2025
Count	82	73	82	90
Difference		−10.97%	+12.32%	+9.75%

Population statistic
Year	2024	2025
Count	90	90
Difference		+0%

It has a population of 90 people (31 December 2025).

=== Ethnicity ===
Census 2021 (1+ %)
Ethnicity	Number	Fraction
Slovak	80	93.02%
Romani	44	51.16%
Rusyn	9	10.46%
Not found out	1	1.16%
Total	86	

In year 2021 was 86 people by ethnicity 80 as Slovak, 44 as Romani, 9 as Rusyn and 1 as Not found out.

Note on population: The difference values of population numbers in the table "Population statistic" and in the sections "Ethnicity" & "Religion" is caused by the use of various statistical methods.

=== Religion ===
Census 2021 (1+ %)
Religion	Number	Fraction
Greek Catholic Church	75	87.21%
Roman Catholic Church	5	5.81%
None	3	3.49%
Eastern Orthodox Church	1	1.16%
Not found out	1	1.16%
Evangelical Church	1	1.16%
Total	86	

In year 2021 was 86 people by religion 75 from Greek Catholic Church, 5 from Roman Catholic Church, 3 from None, 1 from Eastern Orthodox Church, 1 from Not found out and 1 from Evangelical Church.
