= Delecroix =

The Delecroix was a Belgian automobile. First built in 1897, but commercialised in 1898, it was a light car with a rear-mounted engine and a suspension-less tubular frame.

In 1899, the company started building a model with places for carrying four people. It had a single-cylinder 3.5 hp engine.

A small car with a 2-cylinder De Dion engine was also built. This had the added advantage over many of its contemporaries of having the capability to drive backwards.

== See also ==
- De Wandre, manufactured around 1923, and known as "the elegant spider"
