= Scavas =

Sports car design

Scavas logo

Scavas 1 (1973)

Scavas 2 (1992)

Scavas is the name of sports cars designed by Greek engineer Vassilios Scavas that were never industrially produced.

After gaining experience from working at Biamax, Scavas started his first car design in 1969, undertaking the entire vehicle development. Scavas 1, a sports car with a 1200cc NSU engine was introduced in 1973. Although the vehicle received a registration licence, there was no further production. His second model, the stylish Scavas 2 was designed in 1992 with the intention of series production. Again, even though the car received a registration licence (and used by Scavas himself), for bureaucratic reasons, no permit for further production was awarded by the state. Scavas 3 of 1996 remained a design.
