= Méray =

Méray is a surname. Notable people with the surname include:

- Charles Méray (1835–1911), French mathematician
- Opika von Méray Horváth (1889–1977), Hungarian figure skater
