= Apal =

Small-scale Belgian automobile company

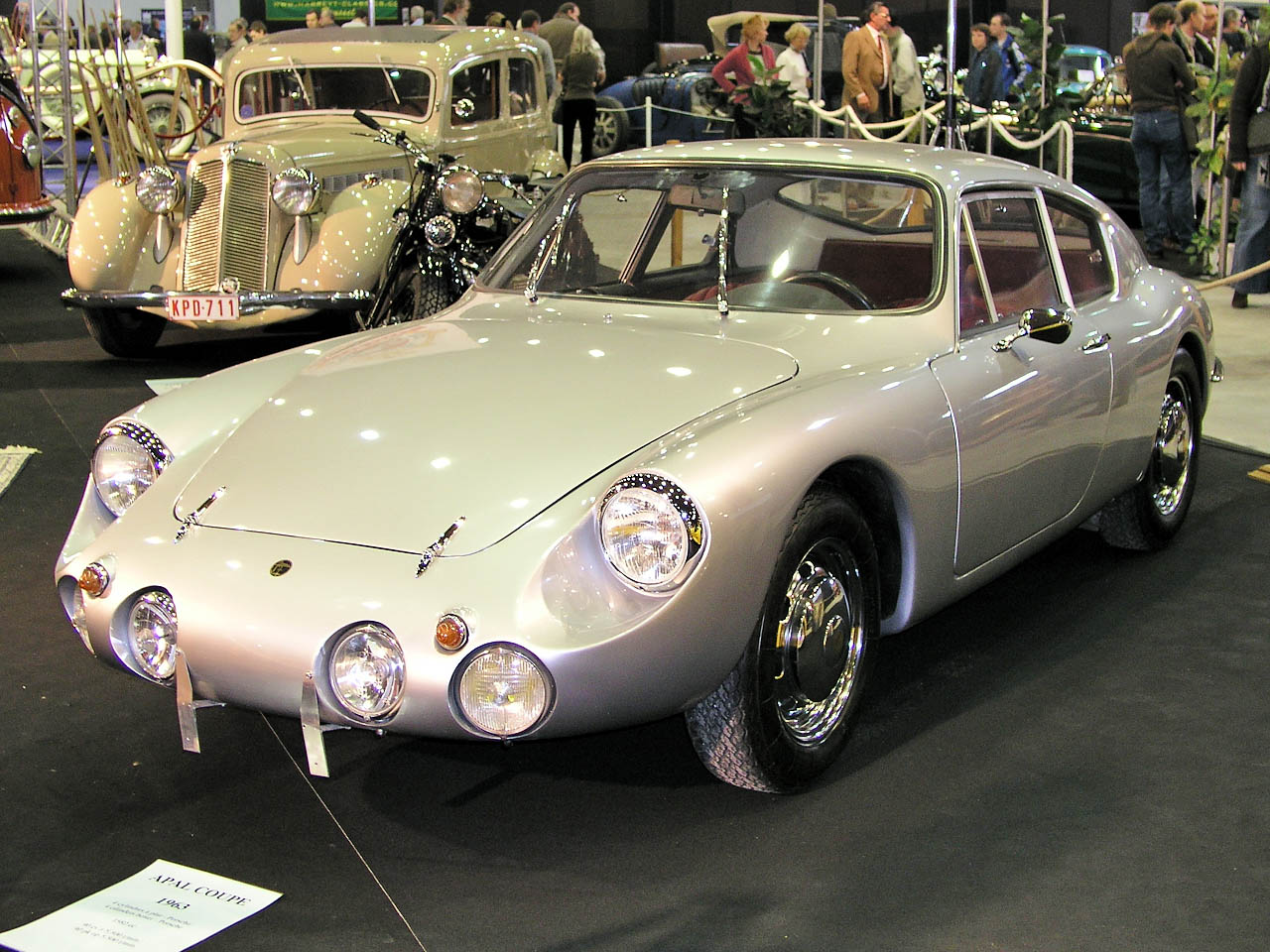
The Apal Coupé was produced from 1961 till 1965 and featured a glass-fibre body on a VW Beetle chassis.

Apal is a small-scale automobile company originally from Belgium.

== Phase 1 -APAL - s.à.r.l. Application Polyester Armé de Liège (1961–1998) ==
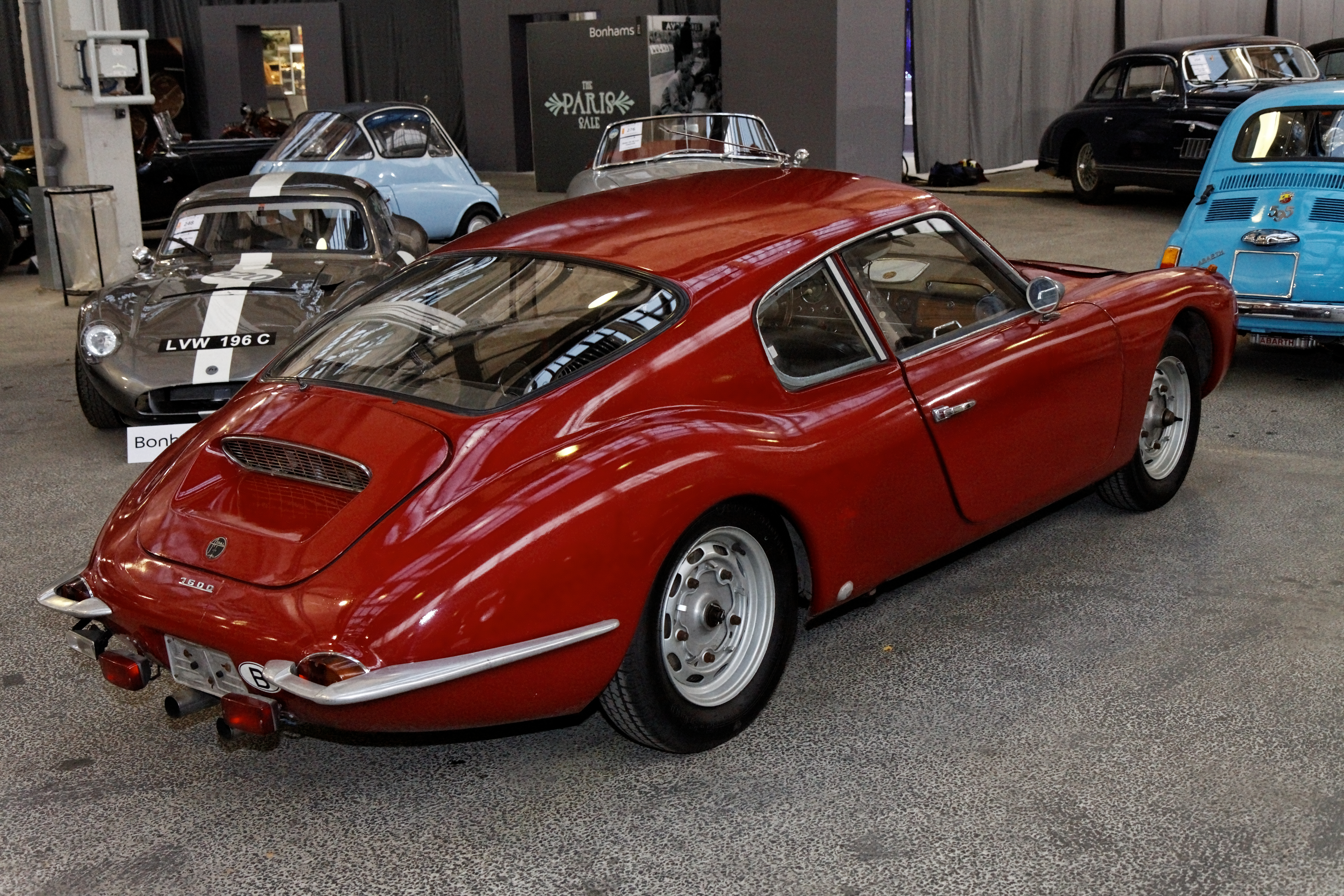
Porsche-engined Apal Coupé 1600 (1963)

Glass-fibre specialist Edmond Pery founded this small automobile manufacturing company in Blegny-Trembleur, Liège Province, Belgium in 1961. Pery presented his first model, a GT coupé with gull-wing doors, propelled by Volkswagen or Porsche engines at the Brussels Autosalon (or Salon auto de Bruxelles) in 1962.

In 1965, Apal started producing a Formule V single-seater. The Apal Horizon GT was a mid-engined sports car and was made in a limited number in 1968 and 1969.

Between 1968 and 1981, about 5,000 glass-fibre bodies were produced for different buggy models such as Apal Buggy, Apal Rancho, Apal Jet, Apal Auki, and the Apal Corsa (a sporty version with gull-wing doors). The Jet was a copy of a buggy originally developed by Glassco Inc. of USA. This set of molds then made its way to England, where PABC/Eresbug built it in London, with the Four Seasons Buggy Company manufacturing it from 1971 on and finally GP Projects from 1975 until 1976. Apal traded the Auki buggy molds for the Jet molds and modified them, adding a T-bar and side skirts and replacing the curved Ford Anglia windshield (not as easy to acquire in continental Europe) with a flat unit.

The Apal 1200 Saloon was based on a Volkswagen Beetle floorpan. It had a thrust-forward nose with a divided front bumper and a well-sloped curved one-piece windshield. The rear-mounted engine was air-cooled, with cooling air exhausting through a grille in the rounded tail, which also sported a divided rear bumper.

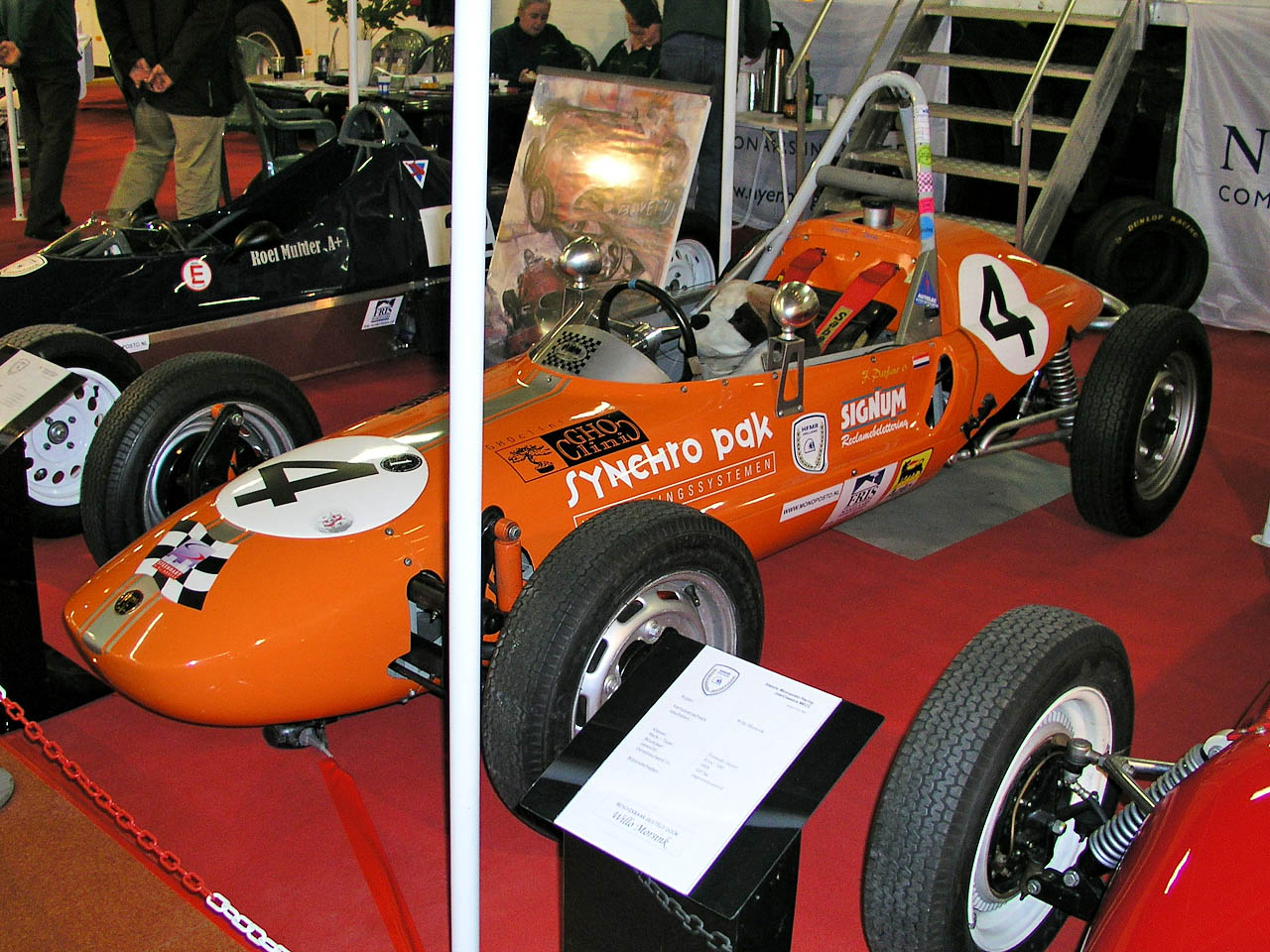
1966 Apal Formula Vee single seater.

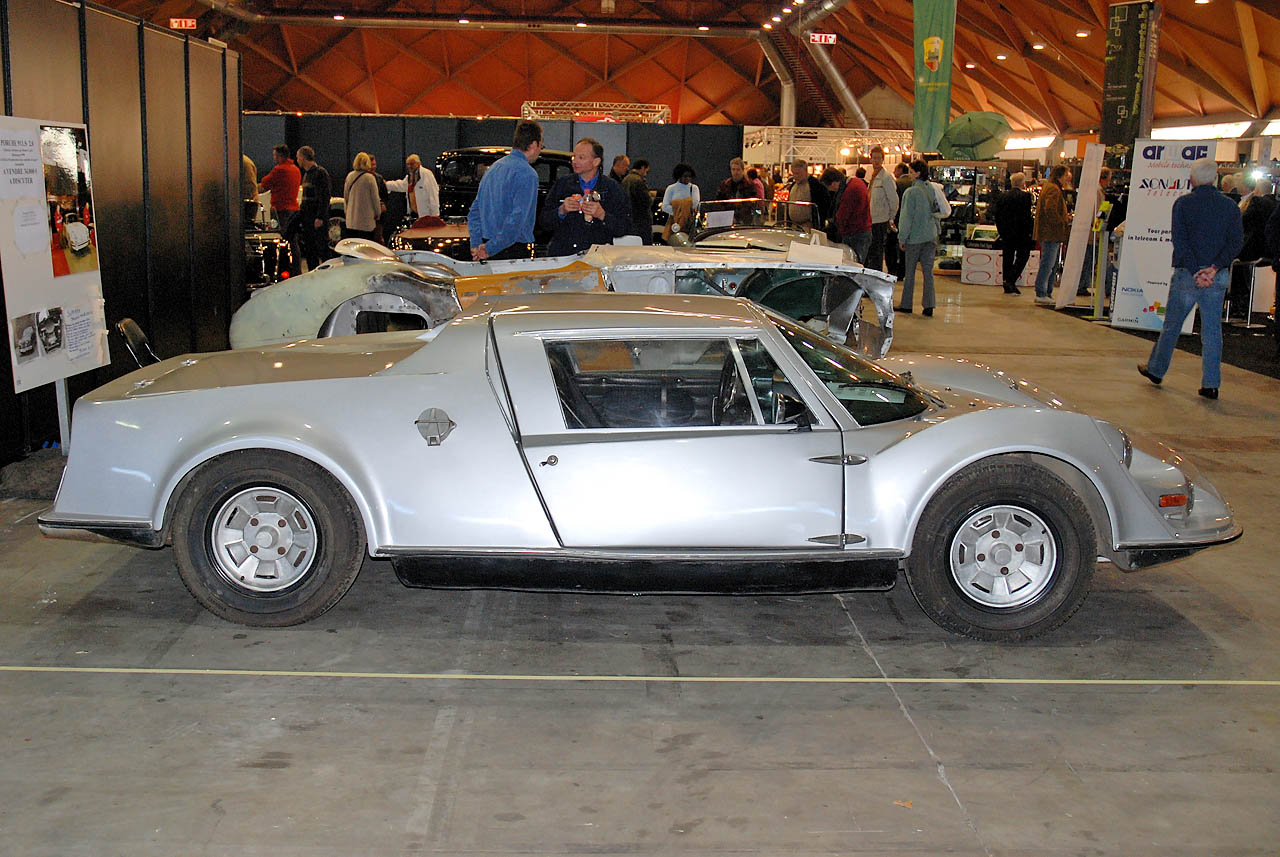
Apal Horizon GT

The company's most successful model was called the Apal Speedster and is a replica of the Porsche 356 Speedster, built on a VW Beetle floorplan. Altogether 700 were completed between 1981 and 1994.

In 1984 Apal also developed a two-seater sports coupé using Mercedes-Benz W201 underpinnings, called the Francorchamps after the Belgian racetrack. This was developed together with an American company with the aim of selling the car in the United States, but with the dollar rapidly losing value the project became untenable and only two copies were built. The company's last model, named the Apal Sport One, based on the Pontiac Fiero, appeared in 1992.

Edmond Pery also designed an all-road prototype for DAF in 1974 and another prototype for Volkswagen in 1992. The small firm produced and sold all models in limited numbers.

=== Specifications of 1966 Model Apal 1200 Saloon ===
Engine: four-cylinder air-cooled VW, 1192 cc, 7.0 compression ratio, rated at 40 PS
Maximum speed: 80 mph (129 km/h)
Overall length: 4,250 mm (167.3 in)
Overall width: 1,620 mm (63.8 in)
Height: 1,250 mm (49.2 in)
Turning circle: 11 m (36 ft)
Wheelbase: 2,400 mm (94.5 in)
Front track: 1,306 mm (51.4 in)
Rear track: 1,288 mm (50.7 in)
Fuel tank capacity: 40 L (8.8 imp gal; 11 US gal)
Empty weight: 679 kg (1,497 lb)

== Phase 2 - Apal Gmbh, Germany (1998- to date) ==
The original Belgian company closed in 1998. A German company, under the name Apal Gmbh and based in Ostercappeln (Lower Saxony), bought all the spare parts and restarted production of the Apal Speedster.

As of 2006 the company has stopped production of ready-built cars and only sold kits and spare parts.

As of 2017, the Apal Automobiles brand is the exclusive propriety of Belgian businessman Charles-Antoine Masquelin.
