= Silant =

All-wheel drive truck produced by Avtospetsoborudovanie

Silant logo

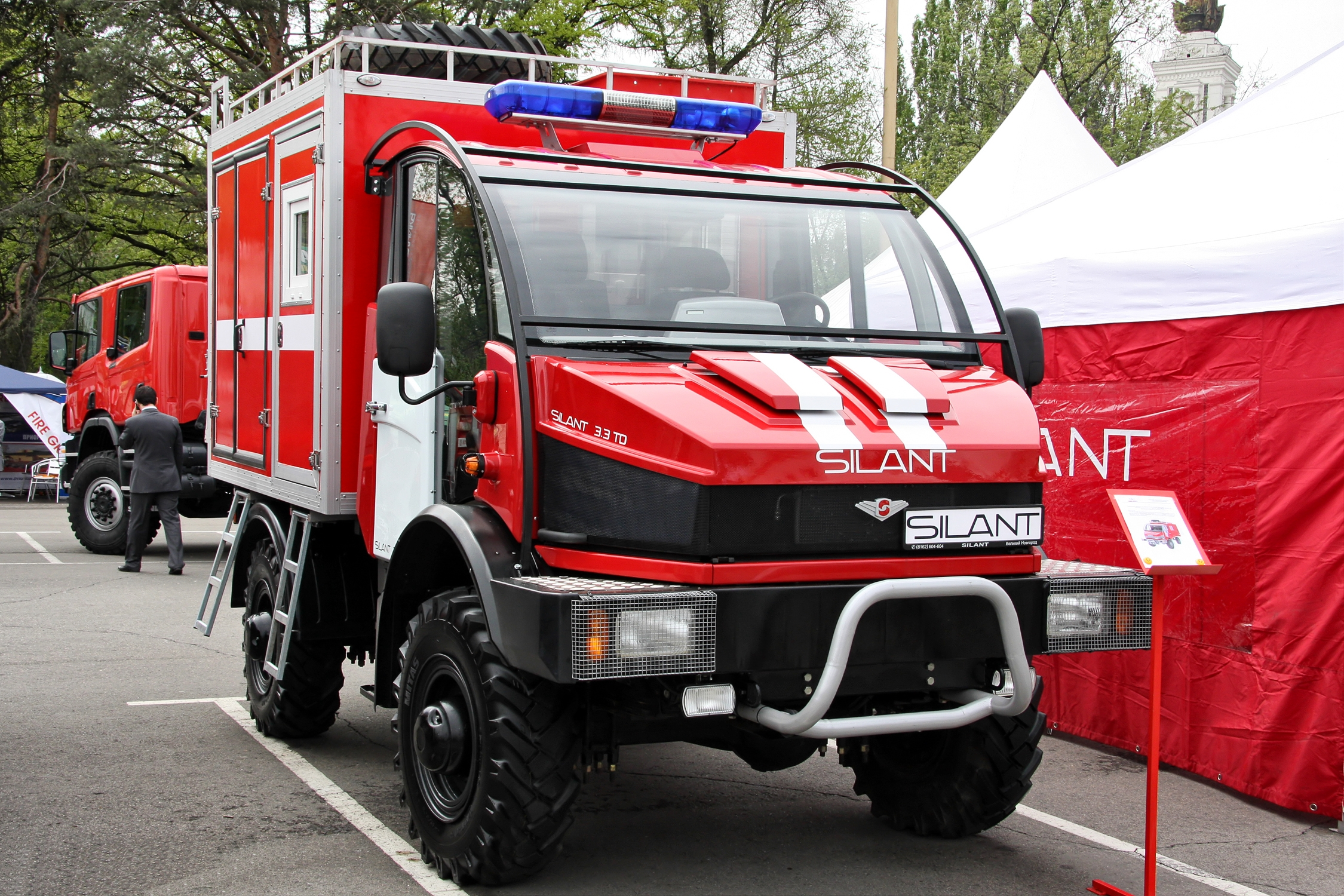
Silant 3.3TD

Silant, is both an all-wheel drive truck and the only product manufactured by the now defunct Russian company Avtospetsoborudovanie (Ru:Автоспецоборудование) in Velikiy Novgorod, Novgorod Oblast, but now is its own company which manufactures two different 4x4 vehicles.

== History ==
The Silant truck was originally developed by the National Automotive Institute (NAMI) as the 1337/1338/2338. In 2011, 150 vehicles were produced. The plant is designed for an annual production of up to 5,000 units.

== Variants ==
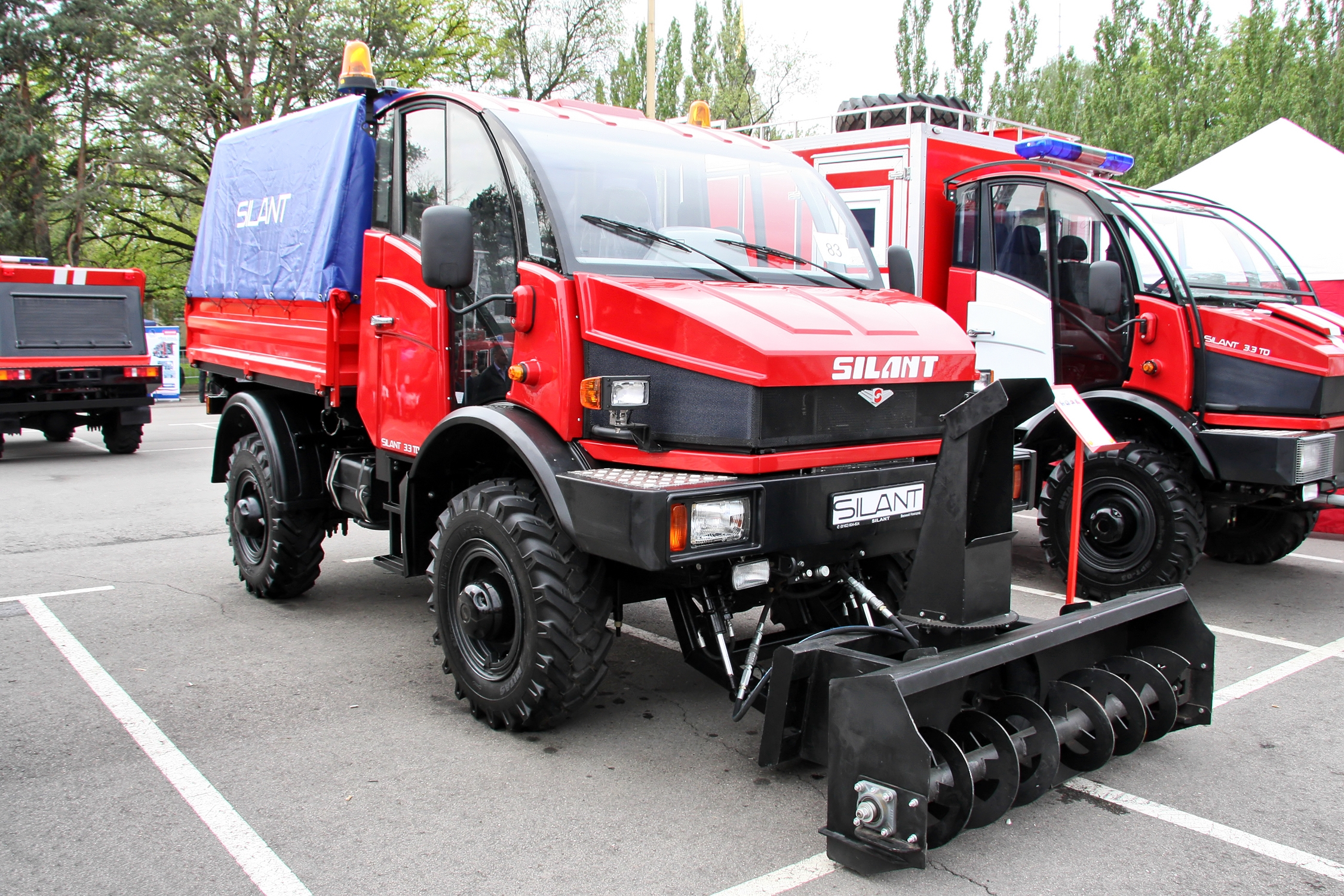
Silant 3.3TD Road cleaning vehicle

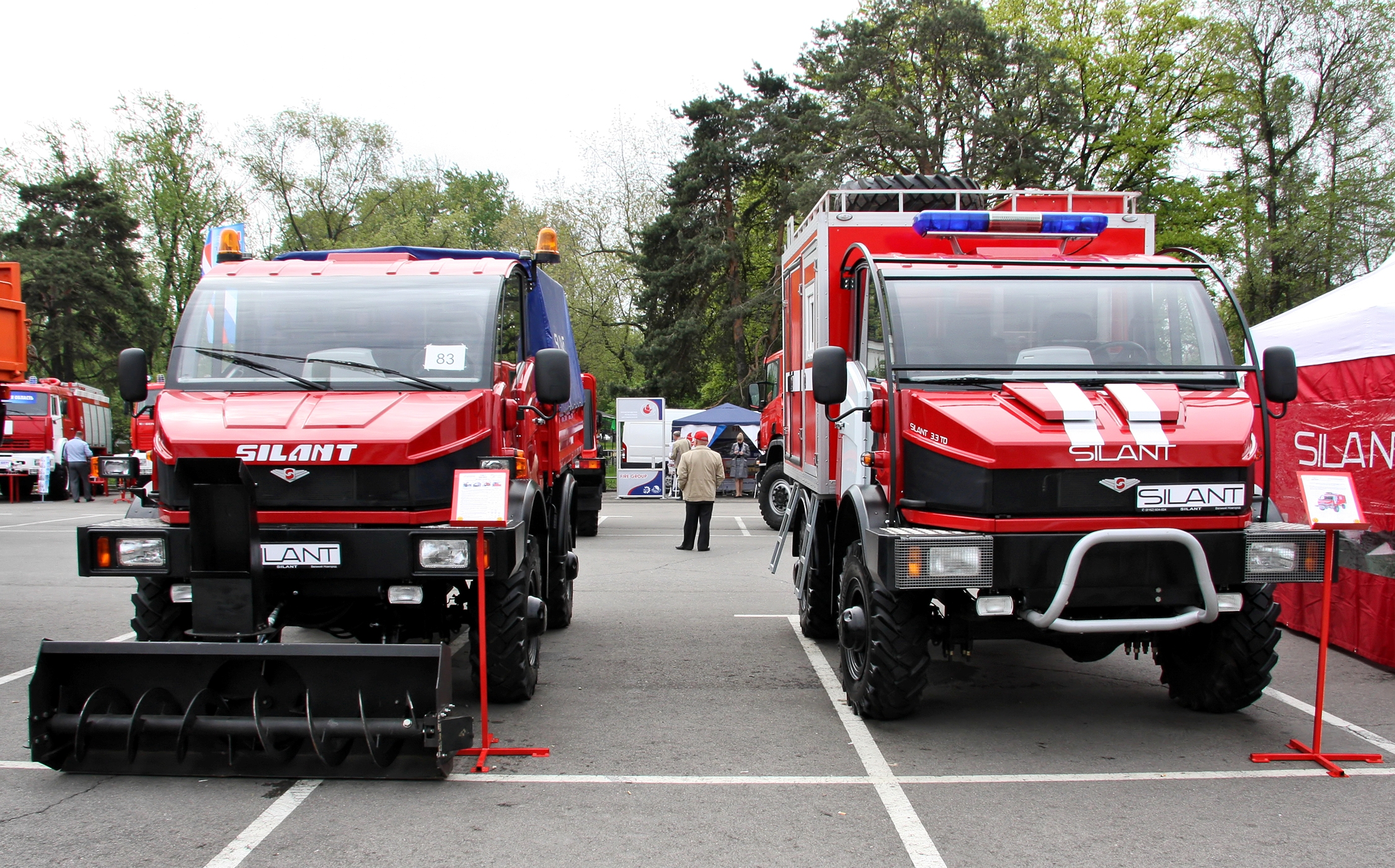
Silant trucks at ISSE-2011

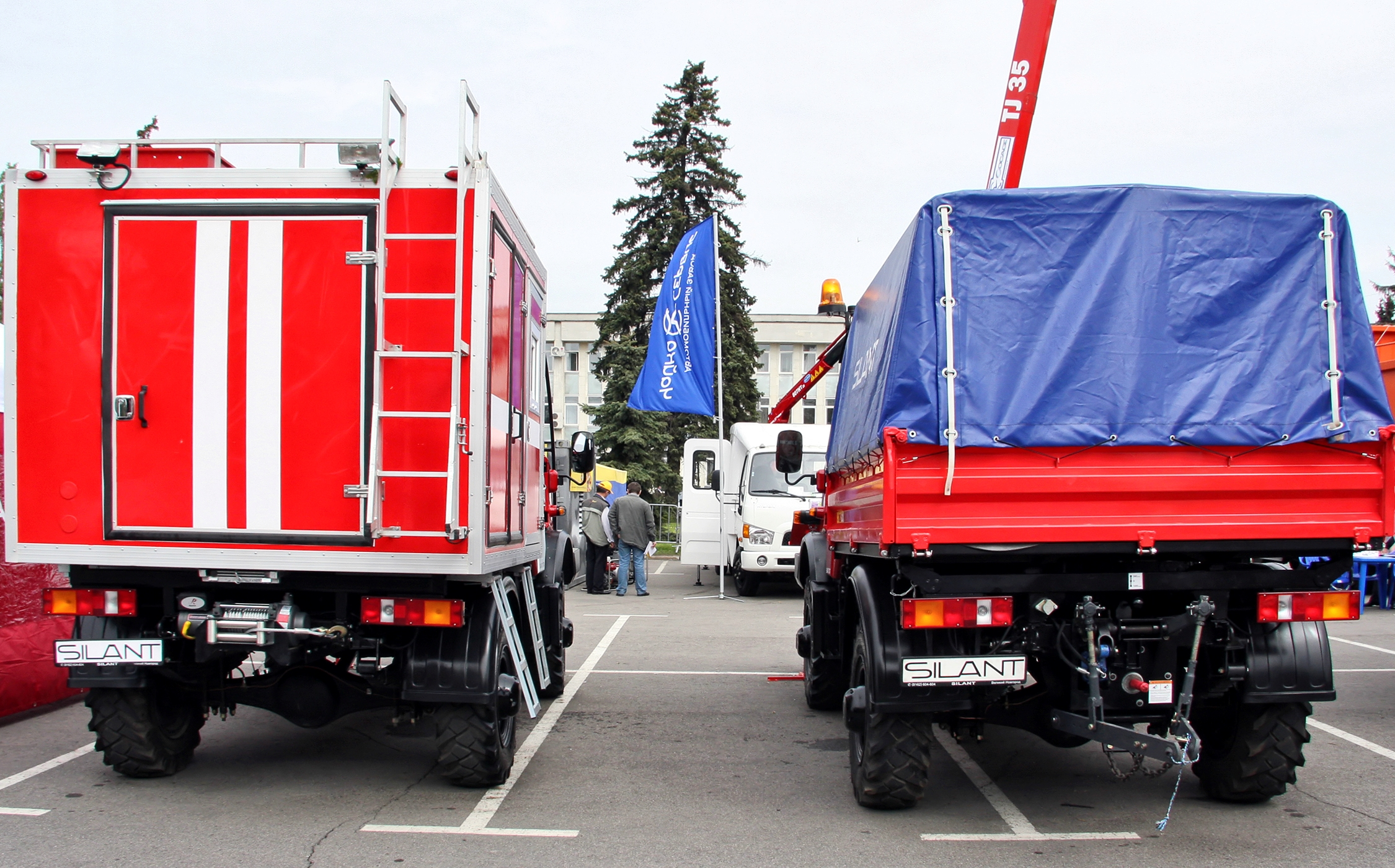
Silant 3.3TD (rear) at ISSE-2011

Silant vehicles are manufactured in many variants:

- chassis cab,
- "vahtovka" Combination bus,
- ambulance,
- volunteer fire brigade vehicle,
- forest patrol vehicle,
- mobile police station,
- "Охотник-I" (Hunter-I) - Expeditionary car for forestry and hunting camps,
- "Охотник-II (Hunter-II),
- "vahtovka vodokachalnaya" (for the needs of the utility, MOE, KMG EP polivomoyka)
- refrigerator (freezervehicle)
- Street cleaner with KMG electric water gun,
- three-directional tipper,
- wrecker/tow truck 16-meter (52 ft 5 7/8 in) (WIPO lift-16-01 "Vitebsk lifts"),
- crane (cranes by Fassi (Italy) with 1-2 tons carrying capacity),
- Silant ASO 6.5 «tractor» EP (for agriculture, forestry and public utilities with low pressure tires).

== Description ==
All Silants have four-wheel drive, and three-person air-conditioned cabs. They use a 66 or 76 hp (49 or 57 kW) 3.3 L (201 cu in) Perkins 1103S-33t three-cylinder turbo diesel, 5-speed manual transmission, power take-off [10], and axles from the GAZ-3308 [2] with locking differentials.

== 6X6 Model ==
The NAMI-3333 is a 6x6 derivative equipped with 65 hp (48 kW) VMTZ D-130T engine and 4-speed gearbox.

== See also ==
Similar vehicles

- Unimog
- SCAM
- Bremach
