= Balcancar record =

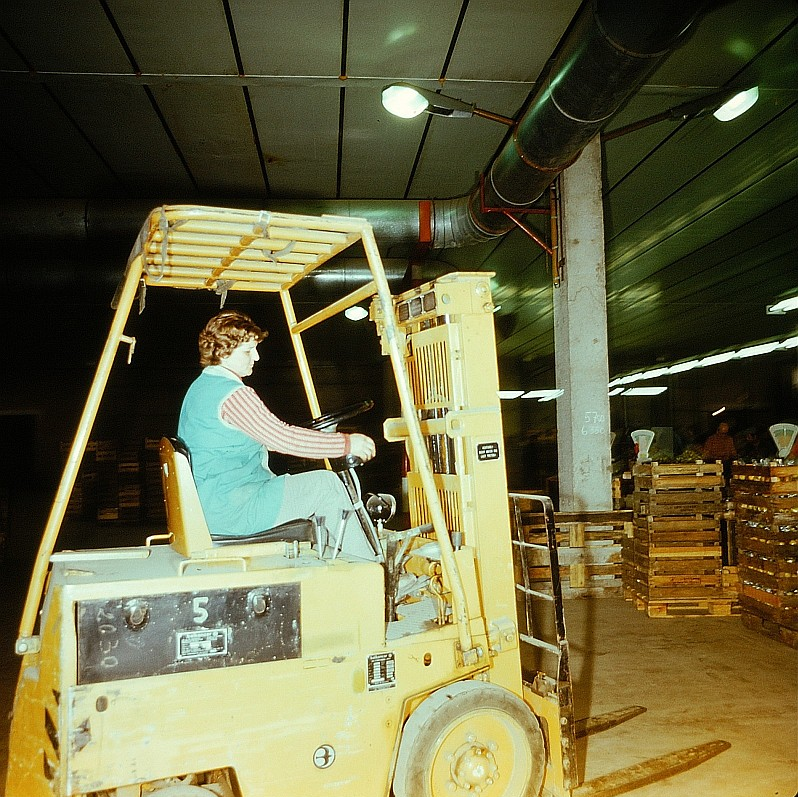
Balkancar forklift

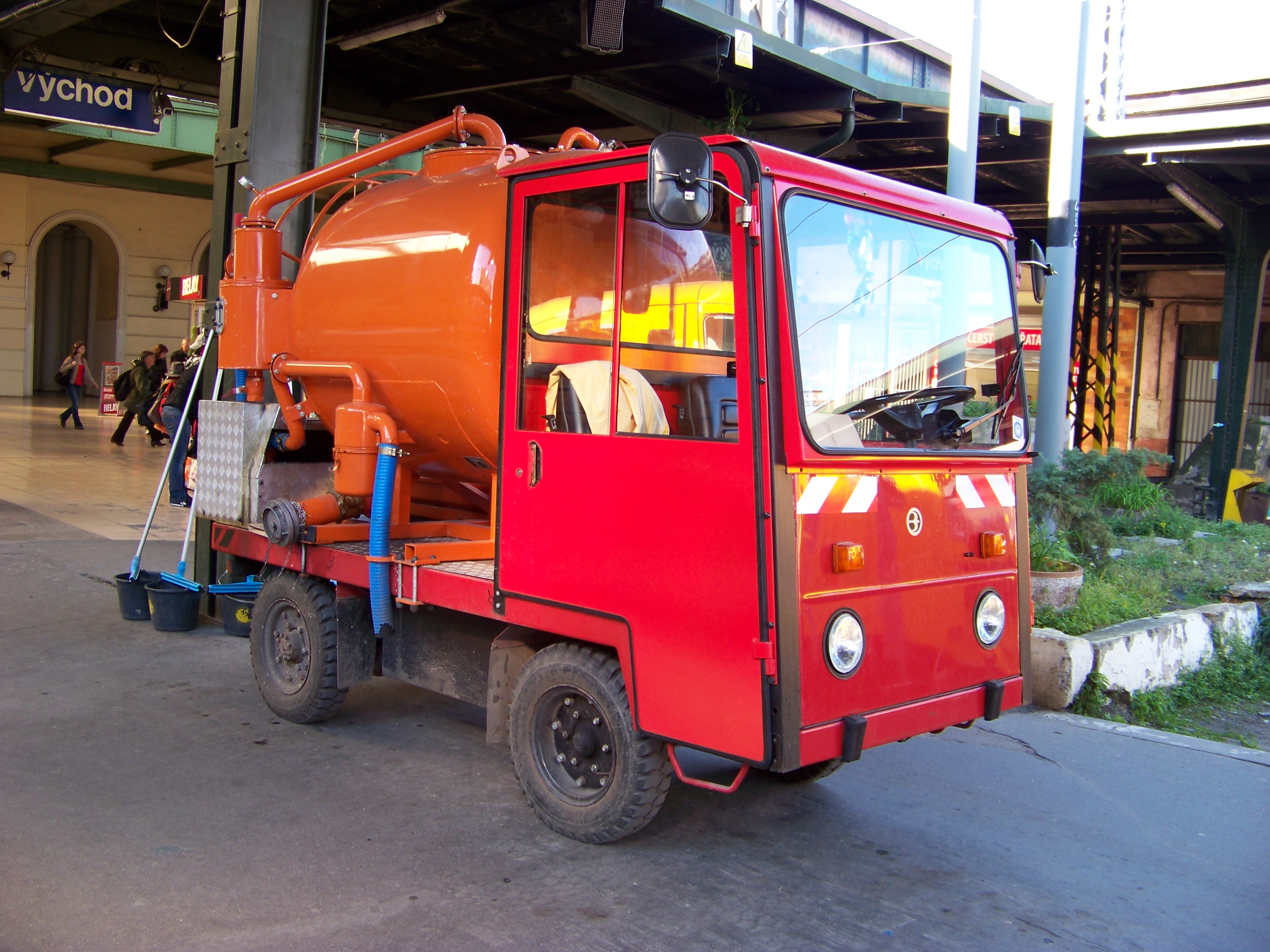
Balkancar electrocart

Balkancar record (Bulgarian: Балканкар-Рекорд) is a Bulgarian machinery construction factory, located in Plovdiv, Bulgaria. The company is the biggest manufacturer of forklift trucks in the country.

The factory was an important unit in the manufacturing of end products (electrocars and forklifts) in the state economic union "Balkancar", which throughout the 1970s and 1980s was one of the largest manufacturers of forklifts and electrocars in the world.

== History ==
Balkancar record was a part of Balkancar, which was among the biggest machine-building factories in the People's Republic of Bulgaria.

In 1950 in Plovdiv, the automobile manufacturing plant Vasil Kolarov was founded, where cars were assembled from manufacturers like Renault.

The production of forklifts began in 1965. In 1980 100 000 forklifts were produced. The first electric platform of the company was produced in 1951.

== See also ==
- Anhui Heli
- Coventry Climax
