= Super Car (trucks) =

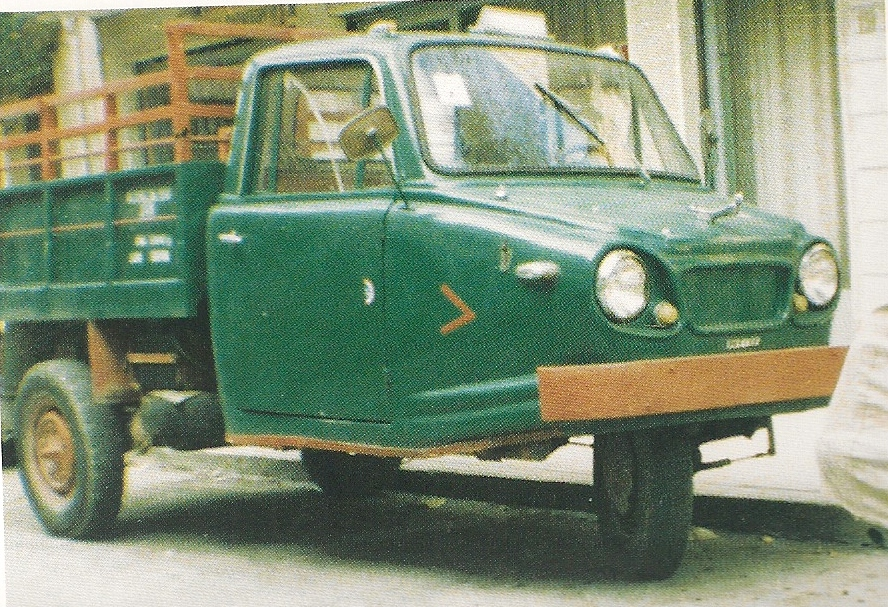
Super Car truck (1970 model)

Super Car was a small manufacturer of three-wheeled trucks based in Agios Vassileios, near Patras, Greece.

It operated between 1968 and 1974, producing light trucks powered by 1300cc Volkswagen air-cooled engines. Two different models were produced.
