= BIOMOT =

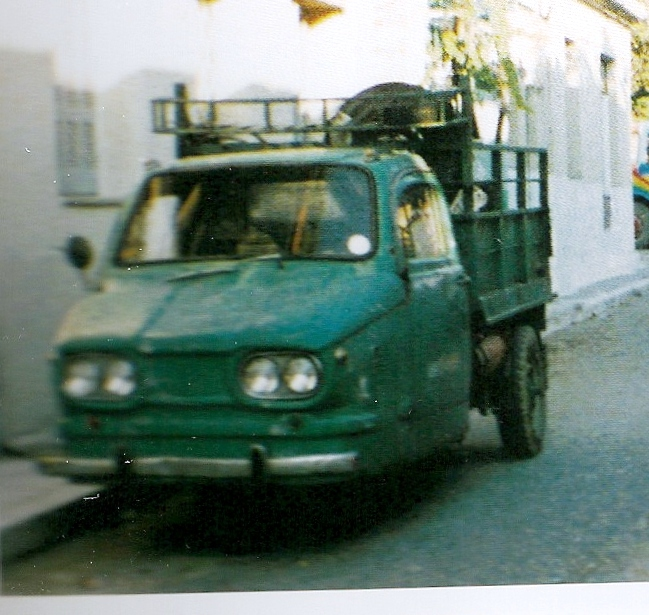
Biomot truck (1967 model)

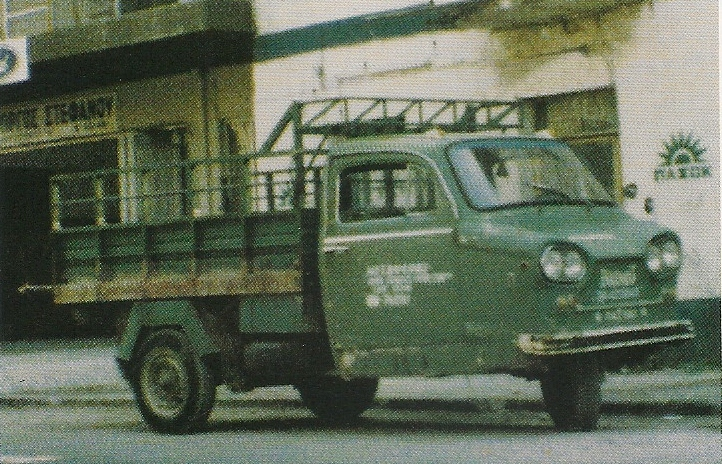
Biomot truck (1970 model), with typical Greek three-wheeler cab

Biomot (its badge was only in Greek, the brand spelled "Medieval Greek: Βιομότ") was a small manufacturer of three-wheeled trucks and other metal products, based in Patras, Greece. Its trucks, produced since 1967, originally used rear-mounted VW air-cooled engines, as well as other VW parts. By 1975 the market for these vehicles had shrunk in Greece, being replaced by four-wheeled imported types. A new “modernized” front-engined model introduced by Biomot failed to save the company.
