= Alfgang =

Danish automobile of the 1910s

- Company type: Privately held company
- Industry: Automotive
- Founded: 1912
- Founder: M. Alfgang
- Defunct: 1914
- Headquarters: Denmark

The Alfgang was a short-lived Danish automobile, manufactured in Silkeborg, in central Denmark, by M. Alfgang from 1912 to 1914. Only two cars were built before World War I stopped production. The cars used French-built engines from an unknown company.
