= Kramper & Jørgensen =

Danish automobile manufacturer

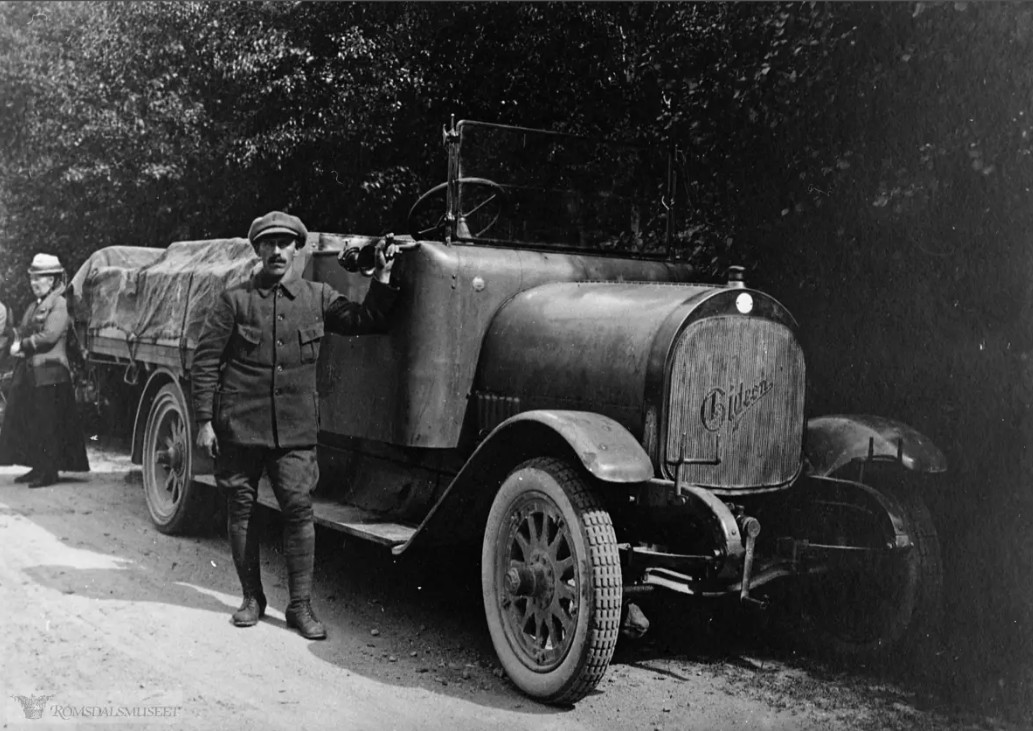
"Gideon" engined lorry around 1928, was used for transort of fish from Romsdalen to Gudbrandsdalen in Norway.

Rudolph Kramper & Jørgensen was an early 20th century manufacturer of engines and automobiles in Denmark. The company started making its first engine in 1902. Blacksmith Rudolph Kramper previously operated a company that built agricultural machines, and had started building Gideon engines in 1893, but filed for bankruptcy in 1901 before establishing his partnership with Sofus Jørgensen. From 1913 to 1920, the company also manufactured automobiles under the name Gideon, producing as many as 164 vehicles before declaring bankruptcy once again. Kramper–Jørgensen had a large motor factory in Horsens, Denmark, as well as two factories in Molde, Norway, and Swinemünde, then part of Germany.

The 1911 catalog showed the Gideon line of upright marine semi-diesel engines and boasted that it powered most of the fishing fleets in Denmark and Norway.

The Gideon line of cars and light trucks was built in Horsens, Denmark, between 1913 and 1920. The cars became known for their high levels of construction quality but did not meet with much success. The chassis of the Gideon was used on the first armored car in Denmark. The HtK-46.
