= Meeussen =

Defunct Belgian car manufacturer

Meeussen is a former Belgian car manufacturer. The brothers Meeussen were car manufacturers between 1955 and 1972. They built a van from a VW Beetle.
