= Ageron =

Defunct French car manufacturer

Construction d’Automobiles Ageron et Cie was a French automobile manufacturer. The name may also be spelled as Agéron.

== History ==
The company was based in Lyon, France and began production of automobiles in 1908 under the name Ageron. Production ended in 1910.

== Vehicles ==
Ageron offered a car named the 10/12 CV. The vehicle had a four-cylinder engine with power being transferred to the rear axles via a chain. The vehicle also featured a compressed-air starter. Models with a single cylinder or two cylinder engines that offered 6 to 12 CV were also available.
