= SAM (vehicles) =

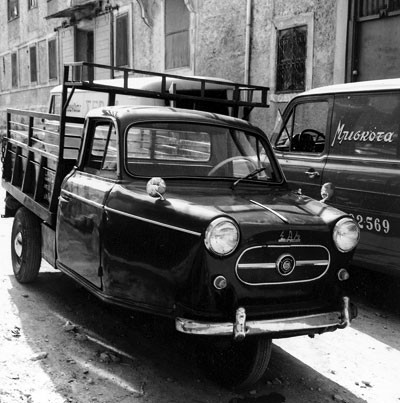
SAM truck (1966 model)

The name SAM (not to be confused with S.A.M., a Swedish automotive company) stands for Stephanos A. Mpaltas (badge 'ΣΑΜ', in Greek, appearing in the logo), the founder of this Greek company, one of several that produced three-wheeler trucks in that country, in business between 1966 and 1974. Its first models used 1200cc Volkswagen air-cooled engines, while Ford 1300cc engines powered later models. The chassis developed by SAM was very robust and some of its trucks were surviving 30 years after the company went out of business.
