= Hillen (surname) =

Hillen is a surname. Notable people with the surname include:

- Elsemiek Hillen (born 1959), Dutch field hockey player
- Fritjof Hillén (1893–1977), Swedish footballer
- Hans Hillen (born 1947), Dutch politician
- Jack Hillen (born 1986), American ice hockey player
- John Hillen (born 1966), American businessman
- Michiel Hillen van Hoochstraten (c. 1476–1558), Flemish printer and publisher
- Seán Hillen (born 1961), Irish artist
- Solomon Hillen Jr. (1810–1873), American politician
