= Van Gink =

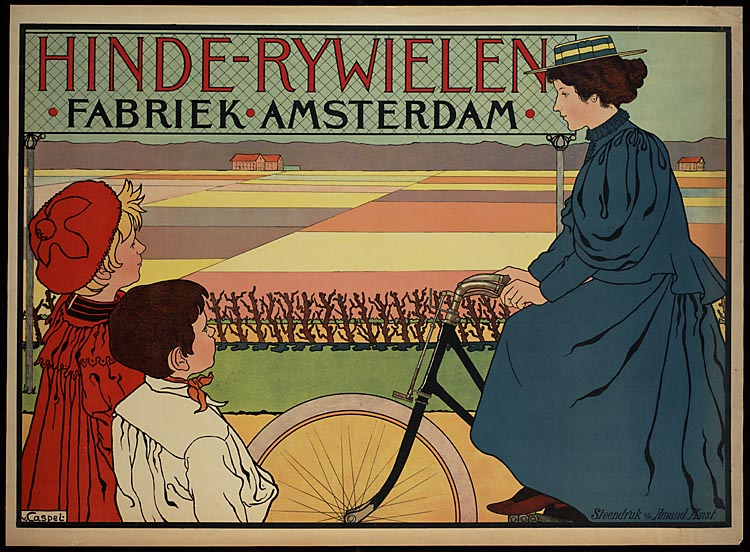
Hinde bicycles

The Van Gink was a Dutch automobile manufactured between 1899 and around 1903. Powered by two separate 2½ hp De Dion-Bouton-engines mounted at its rear, the tubular-framed voiturette was the product of a cycle maker from Amsterdam.
