= Shelter (automobile) =

Overview
- Manufacturer: Arnold van der Goot
- Production: 1956; 7 built

Body and chassis
- Class: City car
- Body style: Two-door, two seat coupe

Powertrain
- Engine: 228 cc (14 in³) Handmade single-cylinder, air-cooled two-stroke
- Transmission: Three-speed with centrifugal clutch

Dimensions
- Length: 2 m (75 inches)
- Curb weight: 220 kg (485 lb)

The Shelter was an experimental city car of the 1950s and one of the first applications of such a concept.

It was conceived, designed and built by Dutch engineering student Arnold van der Goot starting in 1954. Van der Goot's interest in transportation developed during his postwar employment by Bristol Aeroplane Company. He hit upon the idea of a small, light and readily available "pool car" specifically for intracity transportation when faced with a university project. Such a car could conceivably be rented almost anywhere in the city, driven within the city limits and dropped off at any of the rental stations. The government of the Netherlands took an interest in van der Goot's project and helped with financial backing since, even at that time, traffic congestion on the narrow, cobblestoned streets of Amsterdam was a problem.

The result was a tiny, very basic automobile two years in planning and development. The three-wheeled Shelter was almost entirely built by hand from sheet steel shaped as necessary. About the only parts not handmade were the speedometer, the Bing carburetor, the Bosch "Dynastart" ignition system, the tires, the windshield and the headlight surrounds, the latter of which were produced by a local cookware manufacturer. The upright, boxy front end was adorned by a vestigial front bumper and "SHELTER" badging while the rear with its single drive wheel was wrapped in curved sheet steel which, in the words of author Adrienne Kessel, gave the car an almost "Dalek-like appearance." A unique homemade hydroforming process designed by van der Goot was used to form the roof. Water was forced between the halves of a concrete mold, thereby shaping the roof. Van der Goot even built the 228 cc, 6 kW (8 hp) single-cylinder, two-stroke engine by hand, creating its connecting rod out of curved, spot-welded gas pipe. Its light weight and modular design were such that both the engine and its rudimentary three-speed transmission with centrifugal clutch could be swapped out in about five minutes with minimal manpower.

Problems with brittle, easily broken axles (especially due to the aforementioned cobblestones) and engine fires caused the Dutch government to pull out of the project. Though van der Goot had amassed enough parts to build twenty cars, only seven were built and at least two examples survive to the present day. One car, a restored example that was the subject of both the photo and the printed reference credited below is owned by Van der Goot's son, Erik, and the other by collector Sjoerd ter Burg, contributor to the Isetta Club article linked below. Autovisie featured a Shelter car that has been restored by Hans Bodewes [article and video in Dutch]

== External links and references ==
- Kessel, Adrienne. The World's Strangest Automobiles, Regency House Publishing 2001, pp. 26–35. ISBN 1-58663-213-2
- 1980 article from the Isetta Owner's Club
