= FYK =

Overview
- Type: Supercar
- Manufacturer: Aetek AS
- Model years: 2006
- Designer: Arild Tjomsland

Body and chassis
- Class: Concept car
- Body style: 2-door coupé

Powertrain
- Engine: Modified V8 Ferrari engine
- Power output: 270 horsepower

FYK is a Norwegian sports car created in 2006 designed to run on a mixture of hydrogen and natural gas. It was developed by Norwegian Drammen-based company Aetek with the backing of Statoil and advertised as an environmentally friendly sports car, releasing about half the CO 2 emissions of your average sports car at the time. The body was constructed of aluminium and the fuel consisted of 8-20% hydrogen and 92-80% natural gas. The car was designed to be a technology demonstrator and there were no plans to put it into serious production for the civilian market.

The FYK was displayed at Statoil's stand at the Carbon Expo in Cologne, Germany in may 2006. The CEO of Aetek was invited to Volvo's headquarters in Gothenburg, Sweden for the companies to exchange experiences, opportunities, ideas and plans regarding the FYK.

== See also ==
- HCNG
- Hynor
