= Marlei (car) =

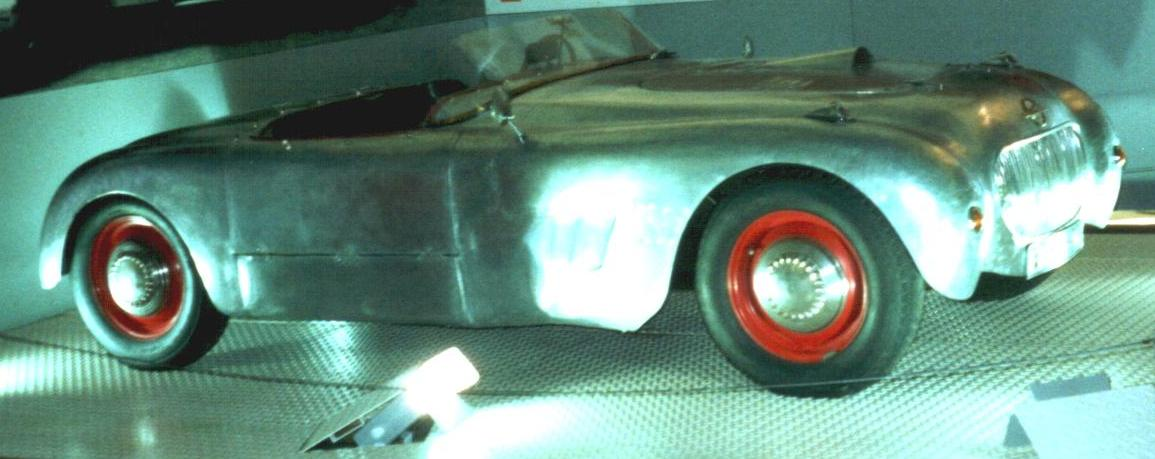
Marlei 1950

The Marlei was a racing car built in Portugal by Mário Moreira Leite (bearing an acronym from his name) in the 1950s. It featured an aluminum body and Opel engine. Similar racing cars were constructed in Portugal during the same period when car races became very popular, including the DM (by Dionísio Mateu and Elísio de Melo), the Alba, the Olda, the FAP and the Etnerap.

== History ==
The project began in 1952 when a beyond recovery Opel Olympia Caravan entered the workshop of Oficina António Sardinha a Vila Nova de Gaia company, which had operations with General Motors. Mário Moreira Leite in his late 50s was the head mechanic at the workshop, he found interest in the Olympia Caravan and started building it into a sports car in his spare time. The bodywork was in a tubular form made up of single piece aluminum most parts of the car were sourced from GM and were highly modified. It featured an 4 cylinder water cooled Opel engine with displacement of 1488 putting out 48hp assisted by a Vauxhall 4 speed transmission, all four wheels had Vauxhall braking system the total weight of the car was 580kg and reached 160kmph.

After this the vehicle went for a lengthy approval process which ended in 1955 and the car entered the competitions but due to the delay the competitor's machines were advanced years ahead of Marlei which resulted in a disadvantage anyway the car still managed to secure second place in its class at IV Rally of Porto.

== See also ==
- Opel Olympia
- Vauxhall
- General Motors
