= Sunnyclist =

Sunnyclist is the name of a series of "green" vehicles created by Enermech (formerly Energomichaniki Kritis), a Herakleion, Crete-based company involved in Green energy projects. Introduced in September 2013, the first model utilized various combinations of solar, electric, and human powers. The vehicle has been presented in a series of Greek and European exhibitions; it is a three-seater, features a light aluminum frame and a sun-tracking solar panel on the roof, and has a maximum speed of 50 km/h.

In October 2015, an improved version was presented, which has not been produced to date. In February 2022 a four-wheel design was introduced, intended for production, while the company also introduced a three-wheel solar powered bicycle, which entered production in the same year.
