= Dansk (automobile) =

Defunct automobile manufacturer (1901–1907)

Dansk (also known as Dansk & Christiansen) was the brand name of cars built by Dansk Automobil & Cyclefabrik in Copenhagen, Denmark, between 1901 and 1907. The company had been a bicycle repair shop before venturing into automobile construction. It built three- and four-wheel light cars with German Cudell engines. The factory also produced light buses and trucks in small numbers. See the link to "Motorsamllingen" for more precise numbers.

I have two files of images from a publication (US magazine) before 1930 that I would like to insert here, but it is very difficult to understand how WP wants users to achieve this. Before 1930 should be public domain. Right?
