= Ruska (car) =

Dutch car manufacturer

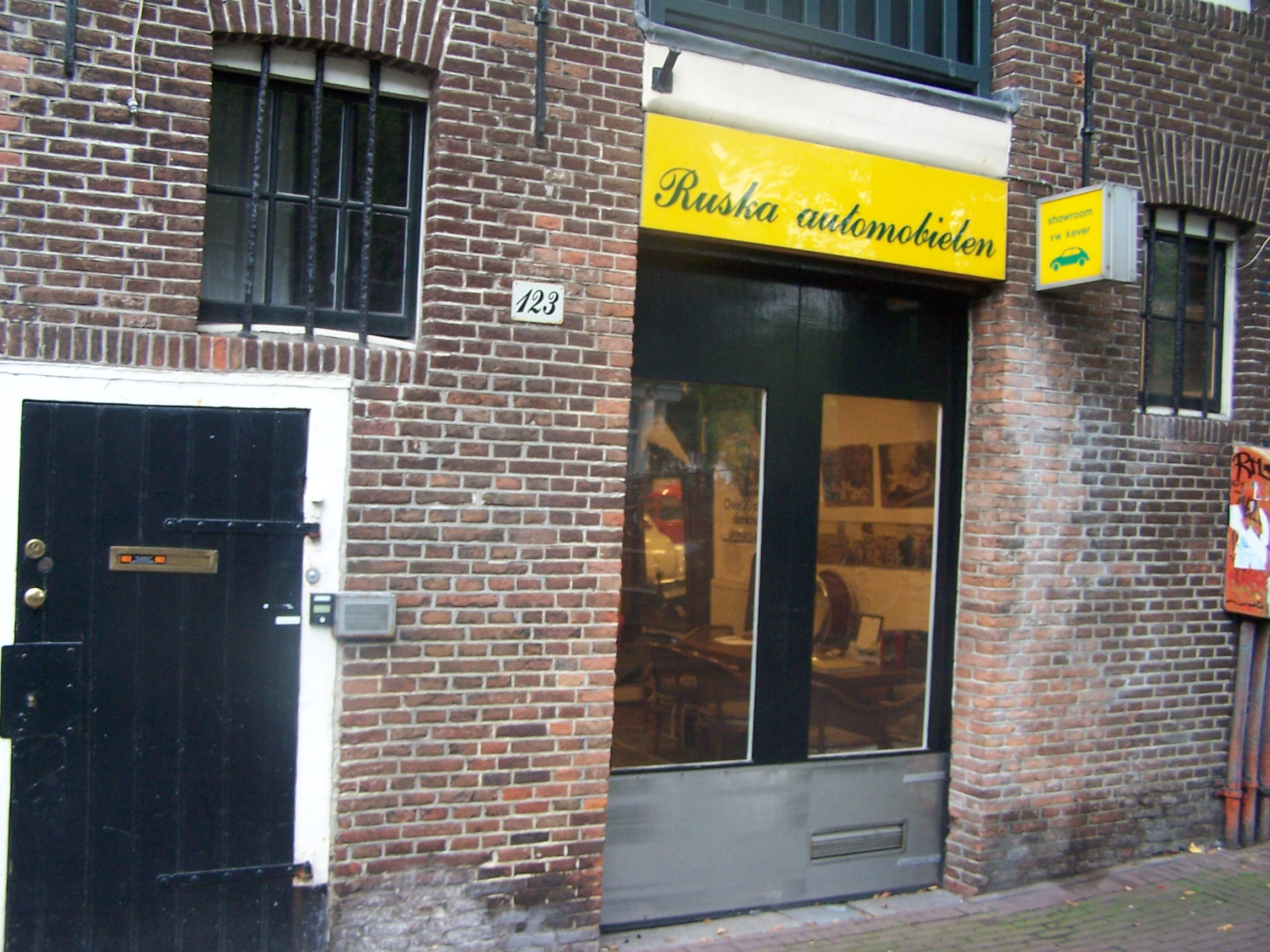
123 Lauriersgracht, Amsterdam

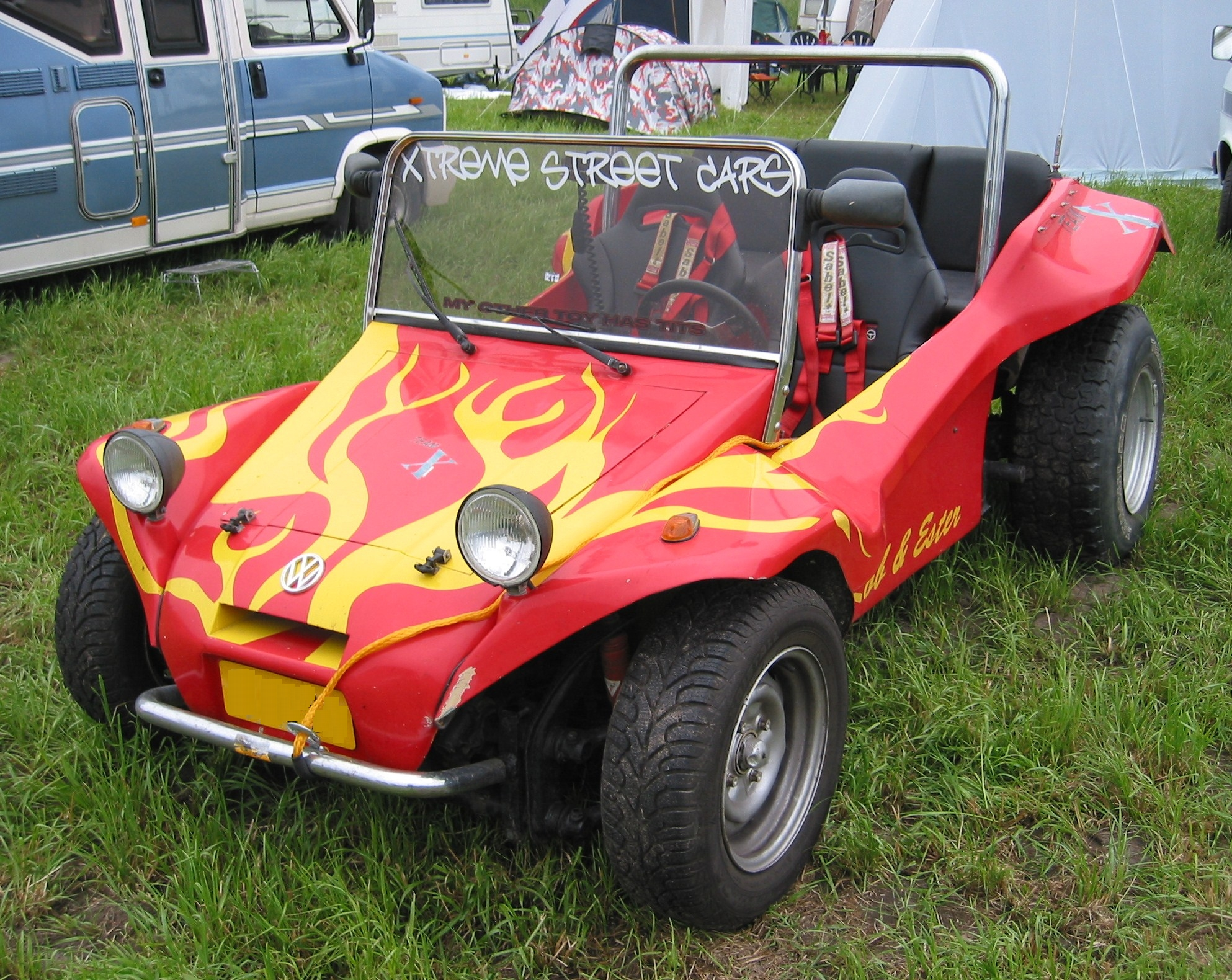
Ruska B1 buggy

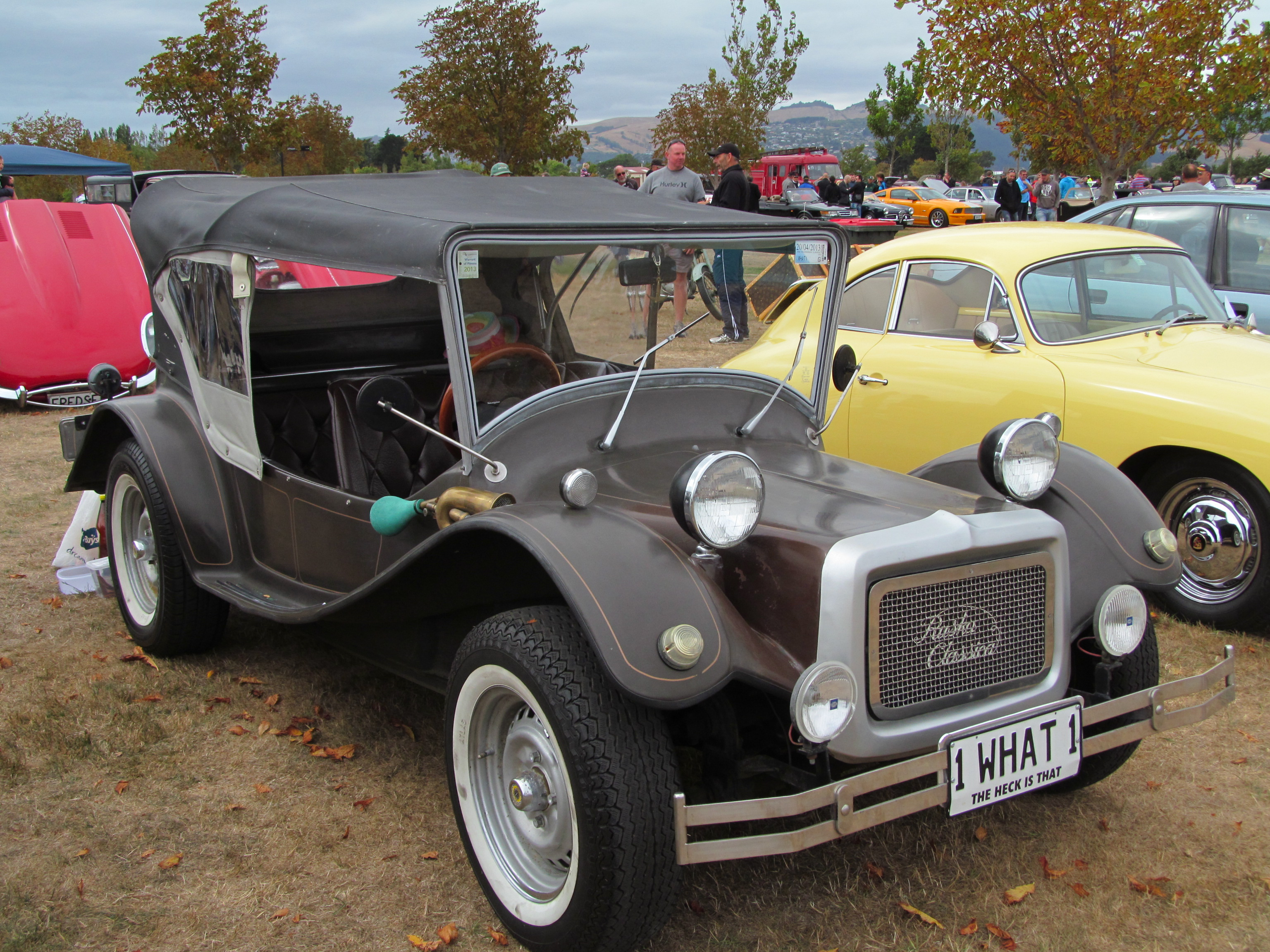
1980 Ruska Classica

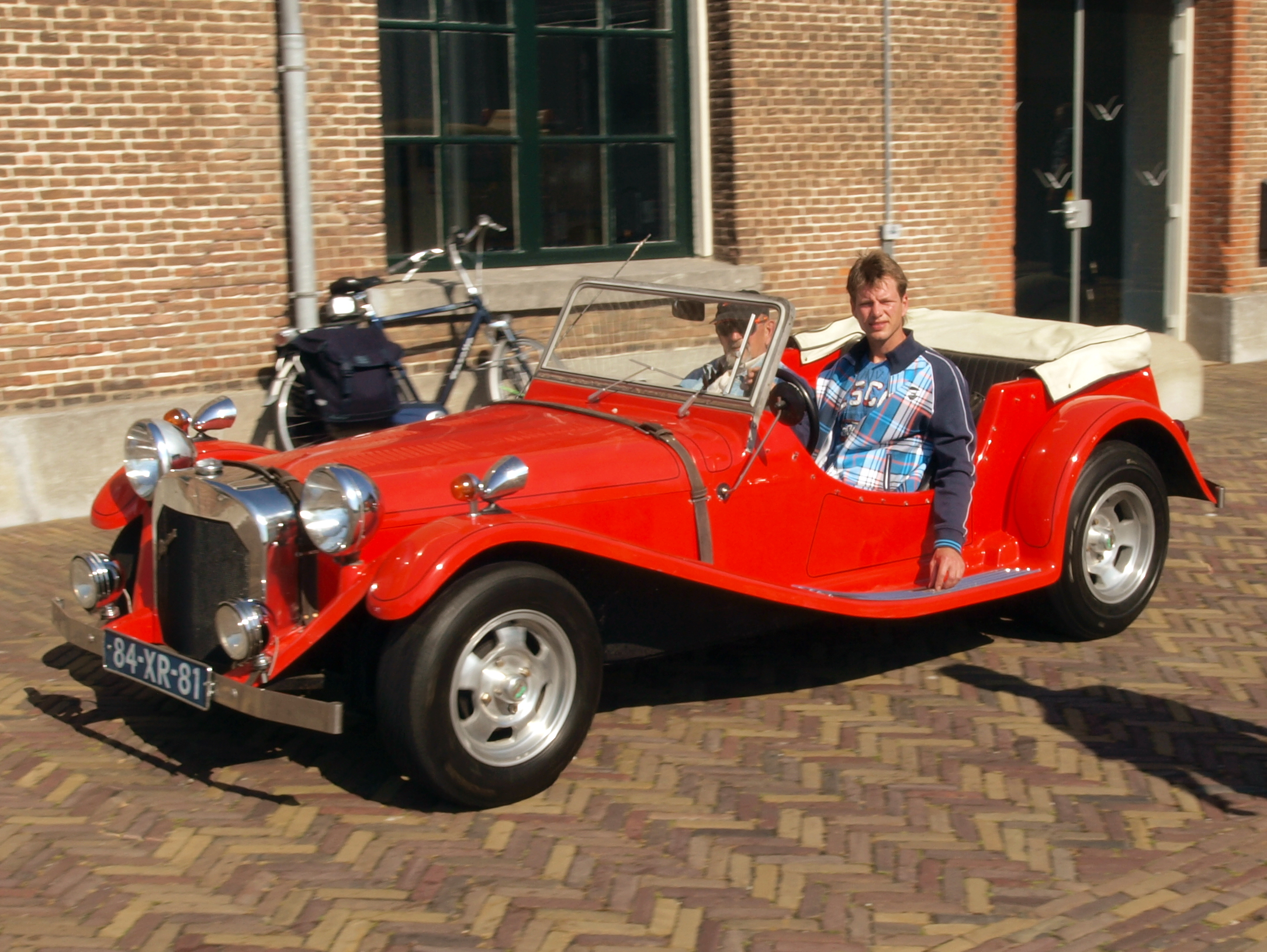
Ruska Regina

Ruska was a car manufacturer based in the Netherlands from 1968 to 1981 that manufactured several open-seater fibreglass-bodied cars and beach buggies. The cars bodies were built on Volkswagen chassis. Ruska are now an automobile repair garage in Amsterdam.

== Origin ==
The company was founded by Arie Ruska after World War Two and initially focused on car restoration. A friend of Ruska's approached him in the late 1960s and asked him to make him a beach buggy. This resulted in Ruska being approached to make more and his manufacturing business commenced with the beach buggy, the Ruska B1 Buggy. By the 1970s, production had reached 250–300 units per annum. Ruska Buggies were among the most successful buggy builders in the Netherlands. Ruska initially offered the buggies for about 4500 guilders, just over 2000 euros), which made them relatively cheap.

Over time the buggies were redesigned but the Beetle chassis and the polyester body remained key components. Ruska designed a number of models himself. As soon as a design was ready and produced, a wooden mold was made in which polyester was cast. The casting itself was outsourced to a location outside the city due to toxic emissions. Ruska was also the only independent automaker in the Netherlands once DAF was acquired by Volvo. Replicas such as the Ruska Buggati and Ruska Regina (loosely based on the Morgan) were also made, along with a kit car version of the buggy.

The commercial brains behind Ruska was the wife of Arie, Christina, who through her enthusiasm and sales instinct acquired the nickname "Christien de Buggyqueen". She died in 1994. Ruska died in 2000.

== Demise of manufacturing ==
After twelve years of success, in which production grew to 350 units per annum, the BVB tax was introduced. BVB is a one-off tax that must be paid when a car, motorcycle or light goods vehicle is registered in the Netherlands for the first time. Sales in the Netherlands collapsed, and for a while Ruska successfully exported to the Middle East. The 1978 South Lebanon conflict brought the export market to an end. After a failed attempt to bring the Brazilian Gurgel to the Dutch market, production ceased and Ruska became a VW garage with an emphasis on Käfers.

== Models ==
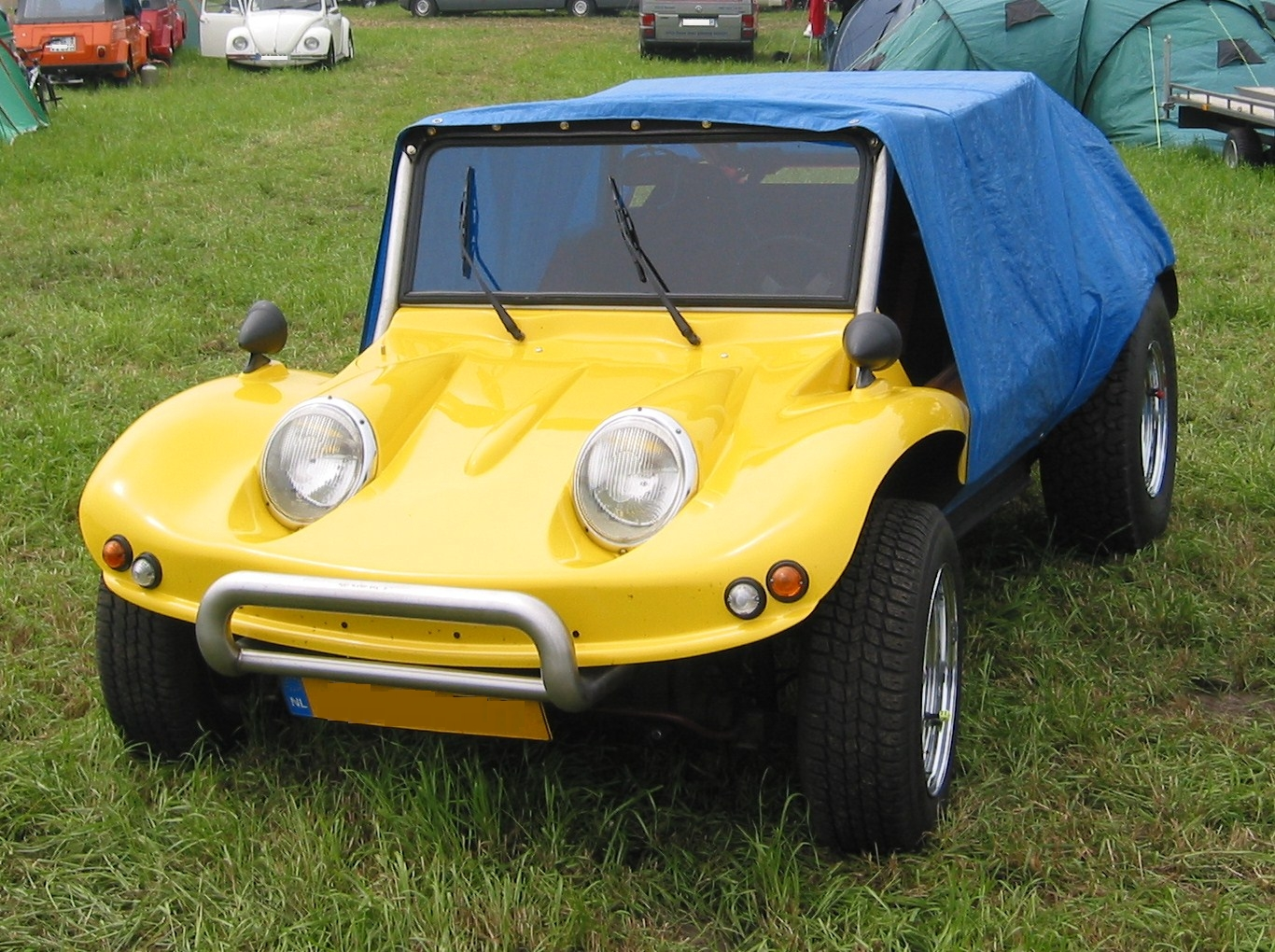
Ruska Super Buggy.

- B1 (introduced in: 1970) (number of copies: ca. 300)
- Super Buggy (1973)
- Classica (1974) - four seat convertible with a body style similar to a beach buggy but with a front grille
- Sprinter (1975)
- Bugatti (1976) - replica of the Bugatti Type 35
- Regina (1977) - two seat sports car similar to the Morgan in appearance
- Regina Royal (1980) - four-seat sports car similar to the Morgan in appearance
- Jubilee, then Starter (1980)
- Sagitta (1981) - similar to the Auburn 851 speedster

== Imports ==
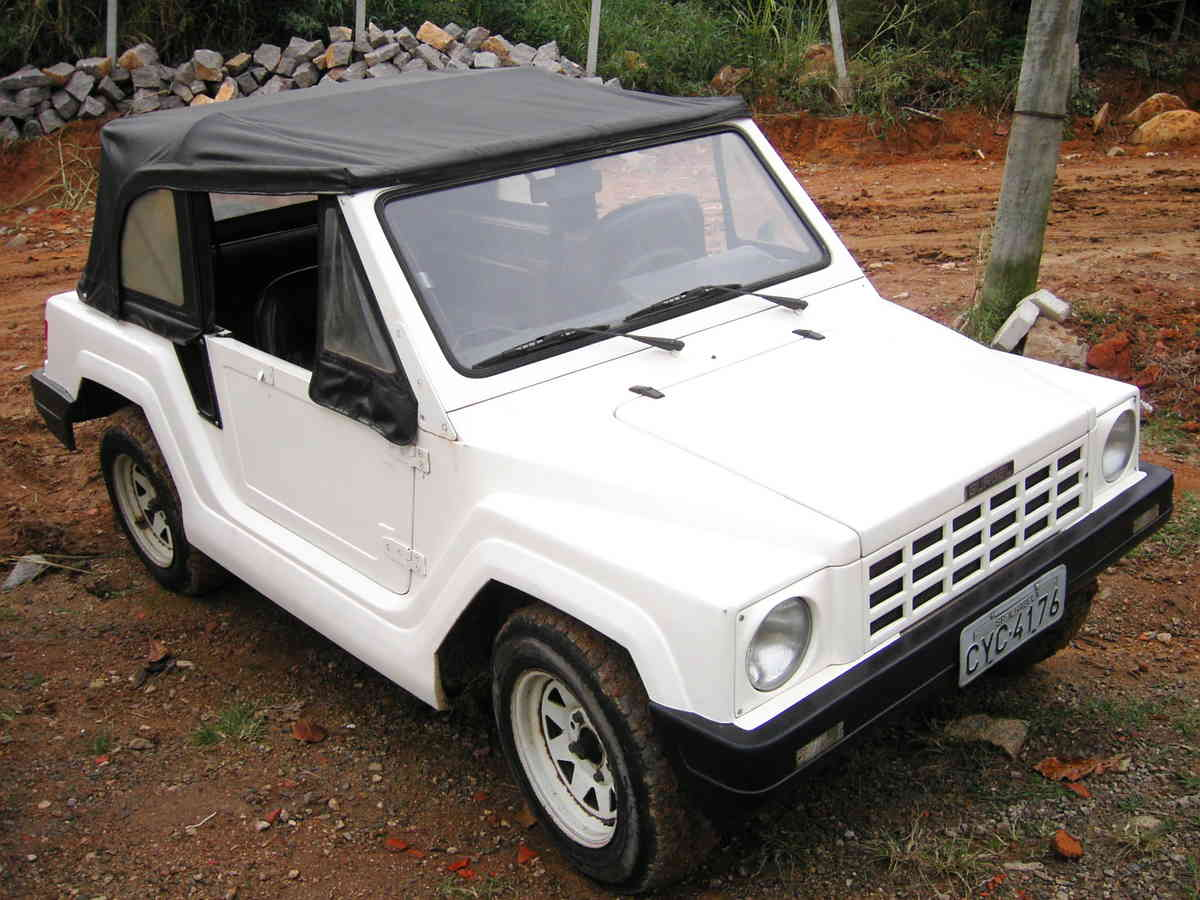
Gurgel

In 1978 Ruska began importing X12s from Brazil. Gurgel had also allowed Ruska to rebadge them to circumvent a trademark registration by Jeep in Europe. They were disassembled and Ruska modified them to meet Netherlands law. Customer could also request modifications. Ruska hoped to be able to sell Gurgel's to other European countries. Only eight were believed to be registered in the Netherlands.

== Bibliography ==
- Harald Linz and Halwart Schrader: Die Internationale Automobil-Enzyklopädie. United Soft Media Verlag GmbH, Munich, 2008, ISBN 978-3-8032-9876-8
- Nick Georgano: The Beaulieu Encyclopedia of the Automobile, Volume 3 P-Z. Fitzroy Dearborn Publishers, Chicago 2001, ISBN 1-57958-293-1 (English)
