= Emporiki Autokiniton =

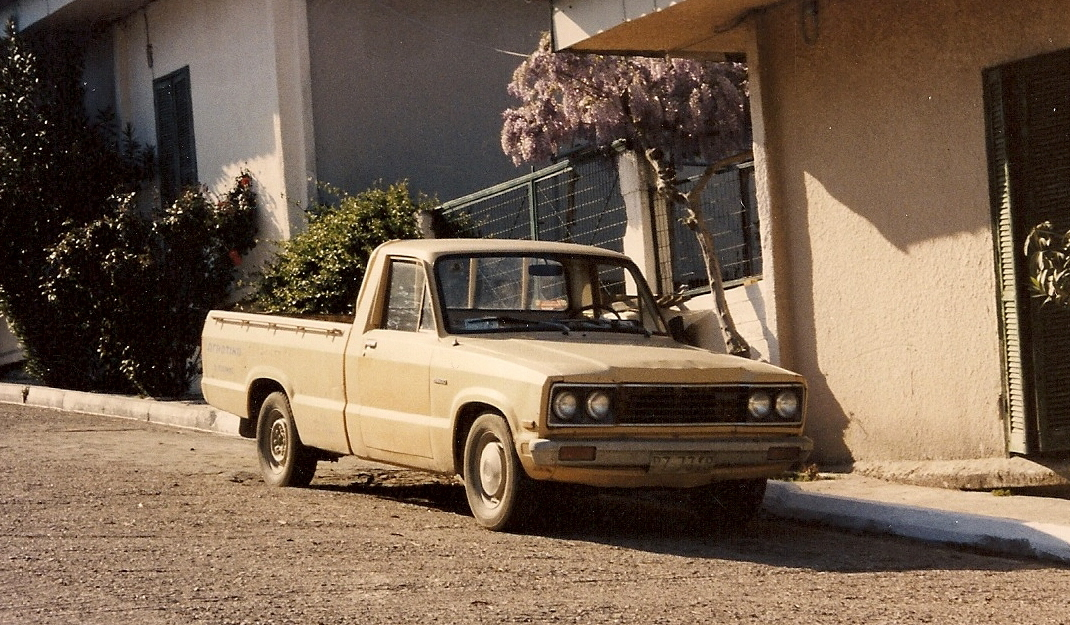
Grezda B1600

Emporiki Autokiniton was a major Greek automobile trading and industrial company (the name means Automobile Trading Co. and stands for its original activities). Systematic vehicle production started in 1968 (although its predecessors had been building bus and truck bodies before World War II), while the company built a modern vehicle assembly factory in the north of Athens in 1971. A large number of Mazda, Opel and, later, Alfa Romeo models were assembled – usually with a significant proportion of parts locally produced. The company also introduced modified versions of Mazda trucks, including longer versions of the B1500 and B1600 light trucks. A number of the latter was also produced with the company’s own Grezda brand name in the early 1980s (a portmanteau of "Greek" and "Mazda"), mostly for export. Emporiki Autokiniton was seriously affected by problems largely connected with the labor unrest of the 1980s in Greece and production was eventually terminated in 1985, after a failed attempt to produce a jeep and a 2-tonne truck type of own development.

This evolution in a way represented the fate of the Greek vehicle producing sector, which, except for the "indigenous" companies, included a number of companies involved in vehicle assembly and license production. In the early 1980s conditions in Greece seemed favorable for the expansion of this activity, and a number of foreign companies (including Hyundai, during its early steps in Europe) had expressed interest in creating assembly and production facilities in the country. However, a number of reasons, the most important of which being the lack of interest of Greek governments in the particular industrial sector, lead to its decline and virtual disappearance. In 1995, Teocar, the largest Greek vehicle assembly company ceased production after 170,000 Nissans/Datsuns had been produced; its state-of-the-art factory in Volos, modernized only a few years earlier, was dismantled and sold to Russia.
