= Torsus Praetorian =

Off-road bus manufactured by Torsus

Overview
- Type: Bus

Torsus
- Industry: Automotive manufacturing
- Headquarters: Prague, Czech Republic
- Products: Buses
- Parent: Pulsar Expo
- Website: www.torsus.eu

The Torsus Praetorian is a 4x4 off-road bus. It is manufactured by Torsus, a Czech company, set up by Ukrainians Vakhtang Dzukashvili and Yuliya Khomych as a subsidiary of their Pulsar Expo company. It can seat up to 35 people, has 400 mm (16 in) of ground clearance, and has a 6.9-liter (420 cu in) six-cylinder diesel engine. The off-road bus is suited to specific industries such as oil and gas, forestry, mining, disaster and emergency response, expeditions, safaris, and ski resorts. The Praetorian is built in partnership with MAN and can be serviced at MAN's service centres.

"TORSUS PRAETORIAN EMPTY SHELL BUS is designed for next stage conversion in verity [sic] of versions, mainly for command control centers, RV, laboratories, mobile clinics etc. Feel free to embody any of your most crazy ideas."

In 2020 the firm introduced a smaller minibus called the Torsus Terrastorm, which is based on a Volkswagen Crafter 4Motion chassis.
