= Bouhagier Patras =

Defunct Greek vehicle manufacturer

A 1920s newspaper posting for the Bouhagier company

1923 Bouhagier bus

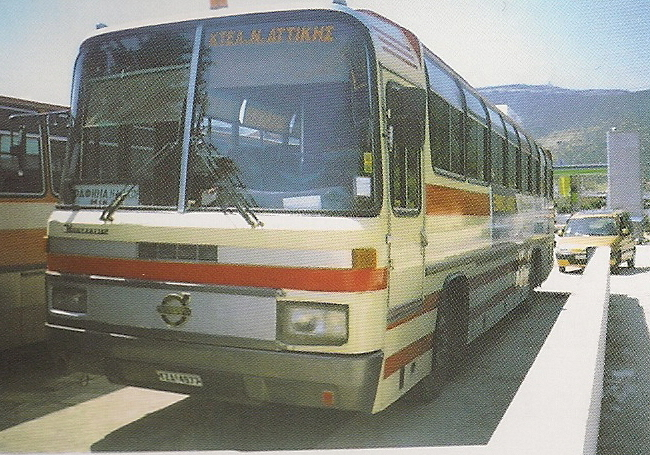
A 1980s Bouhagier inter-city bus; it was a "blend" common in Greece, using a copy of Mercedes-Benz O303 body design on a Volvo chassis

Bouhagier Patras (Μπουχάγιερ Πάτραι) or Buhayer Patras was considered to be the longest-lived vehicle body manufacturer in Greece. It was founded in 1890 and dissolved in 2004.

The name Bouhagier was the corrupted version of the name of a Maltese (name : Bouhagiar) family who had settled in Greece. The company was founded in Patras by Tzamaría (Ioannis Maria) Bouhagier, who was born on the island of Cephalonia, and developed by his sons, was one of the most respected builders of horse-drawn carriages.

In the early 1920s it began the construction of motor vehicle (car, bus and various truck) bodies, and eventually concentrated on buses. Bouhagier has built an extended range of bus models on a variety of chassis and modifications were occasionally done to accommodate different body lengths. The company, like all Greek bus manufacturers, suffered a major blow in the 1980s when the Greek market was flooded with used imports. Since the 1990s its activities were essentially reduced to body repairs until it went out of business a few years later.
