= Hillen (automobile) =

The Hillen was a Dutch automobile manufactured in Jutphaas, Netherlands sometime around 1913; nothing further is known about the marque.
