= Ruska (surname) =

Ruska is a surname. Notable people with the surname include:

- Ernst Ruska (1906–1988), German physicist
- Julius Ruska (1867–1949), German orientalist, historian of science, and educator
- Helmut Ruska (1908–1973), German physician and biologist
- Wim Ruska (1940–2015), Dutch judoka
