= Temax (company) =

Greek vehicle and equipment manufacturer

TEMAX S.A.
- Industry: Automotive
- Founded: 1925 (Tournikiotis-Tangalakis), 1934 (Tangalakis), 1965 (Temax)
- Headquarters: Athens, Greece
- Products: Buses (until 1963), fire trucks
- Website: http://www.temax.gr/

TEMAX is a Greek manufacturer of fire and rescue vehicles, trailers, fire-related equipment, and snow-clearing equipment. The company is headquartered in Athens, Greece.

== History ==
The company was founded in 1925 when Petros Tangalakis entered into a partnership with G. Tournikiotis, a vehicle manufacturer based in Athens. In 1934, Tangalakis separated from Tournikiotis to establish his own company. During the occupation of Greece in World War II, the factory was forced to operate under German control. Regular vehicle production resumed in 1945.

In the years following World War II, the company focused on all-metal bus construction using chassis from Studebaker, Daimler, Volvo, and other manufacturers. Several models were produced; certain models underwent significant chassis modifications to support heavier loads or altered vehicle dimensions. Additionally, the company assembled Wayne models in the late 1940s and early 1950s.

In 1963, Tangalakis shifted its focus from bus to manufacturing to the production of firefighting vehicles, primarily built on International Harvester chassis assembled by Tangalakis from SKD kits. In 1965, the Tangalakis family, along with Alexandros Ginis, Fanourios Gyrtatos, and Antonis Kalogeropoulos, established TEMAX, a new company focused on the production of firefighting and other special vehicles. Another branch of the original company continued under the Tangalakis name as an importer and distributor of firefighting and rescue equipment and vehicle parts.

== Gallery ==
1936 Tangalakis-Austin light car

Inside view of 1936 Tangalakis-Austin light car

1935 Tangalakis inter-city bus (International chassis)

Inside view of a 1936 Tangalakis inter-city bus

1956 Tangalakis bus (Volvo chassis)

1962 Tangalakis coach

TEMAX fire-fighting truck on self-assembly International truck chassis (1965)

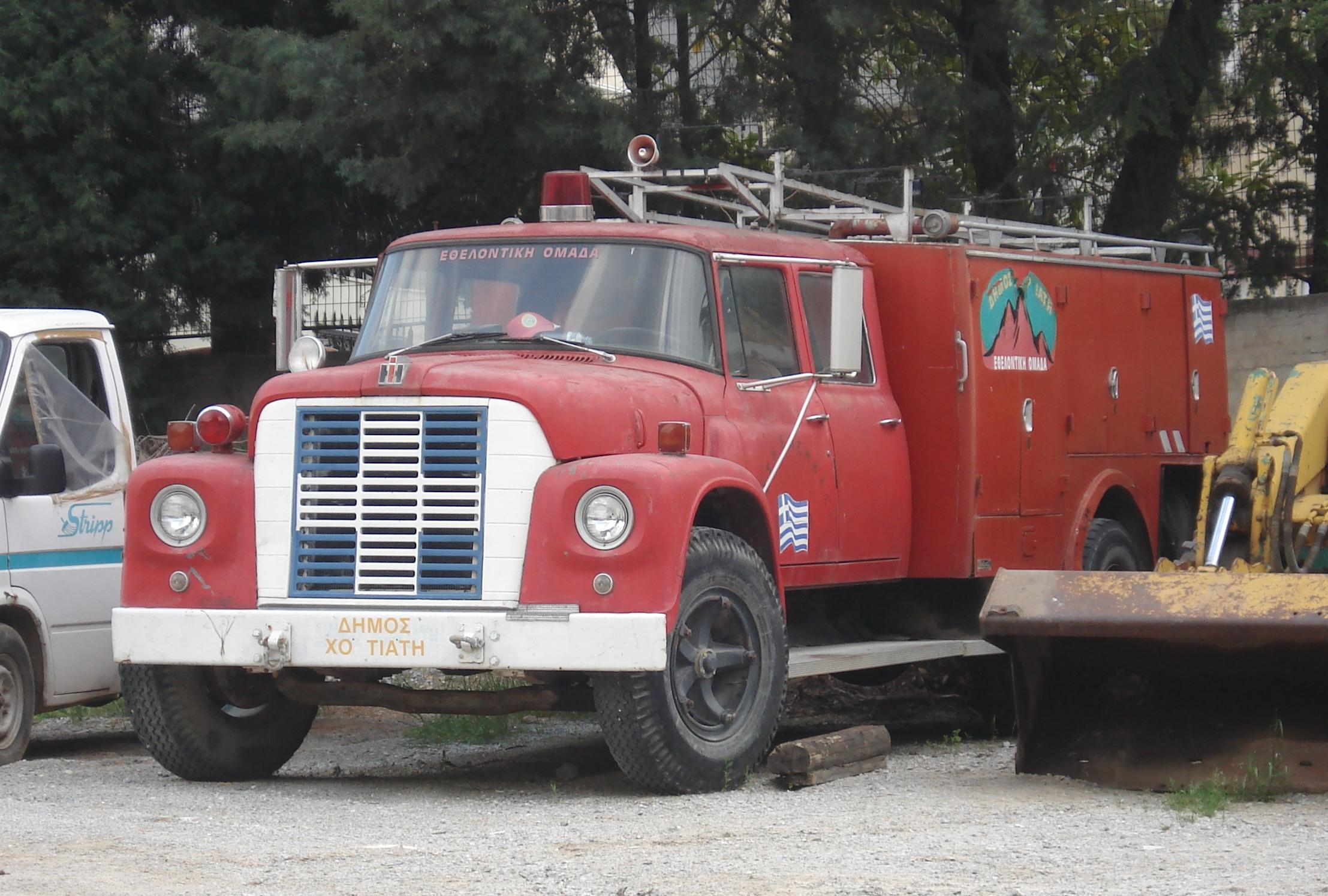
TEMAX old fire-fighting vehicle

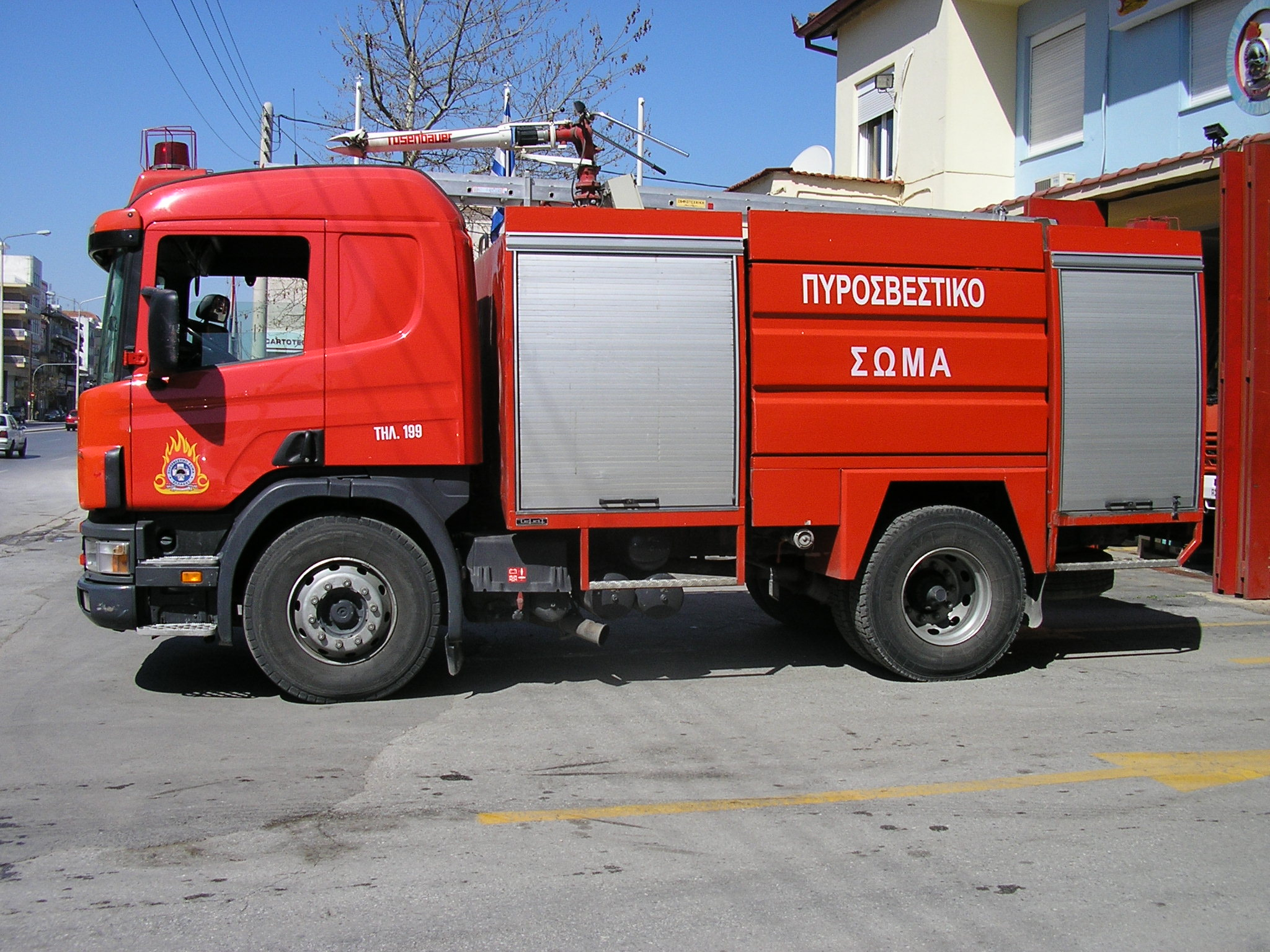
TEMAX modern fire engine
