= Balaton (car) =

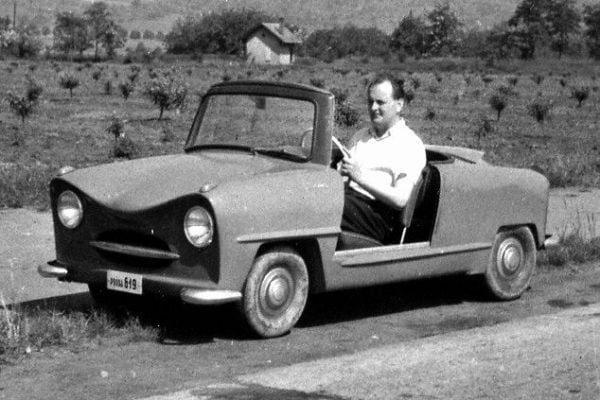
Balaton car produced in Hungary from 1955 to 1956

The Balaton was a Hungarian microcar made by Székesfehérvári Motorjavitó Vállalat, based in the central Hungarian town of Székesfehérvár, which began production in 1956.

It was powered by a 250 cc 8 bhp (6 kW) Pannonia motorcycle engine. The rubber suspension was developed from an idea of Ernő Rubik Senior. The roof and doors were in one piece and hinged to give access to the interior.

The same company also made the Alba Regia microcar with which the Balaton shared most of its mechanical parts.
