= Alba Regia (car) =

The Alba Regia was a Hungarian microcar project produced in Székesfehérvár by the Ministry of Metallurgy and Machine Industry in conjunction with the Vehicle Developing Institute in 1952/1953. In 1955 three engineers were commissioned to work on the car; Ernő Rubik, Pal Kerekes, and Geza Bengyel. Along with two employees, József Zappel and József Horváth, the group conceived of the Alba Regia, named for the Latin name of the city, where it was made, and the Balaton, named for Hungary's Lake Balaton.
