= Light car =

The term light car is used in Great Britain since the early part of the 20th century for an automobile less than 1.5 litres engine capacity. In modern car classification this term would be roughly equivalent to a subcompact car. There are numerous light car clubs in Britain and Australia.

The current driving licence category B1 ("Light vehicles and quad bikes") in Great Britain covers motor vehicles with four wheels up to 400 kg unladen, or 550 kg if designed for carrying goods. This category does not exist in Northern Ireland; a full car licence is required for light cars and quad bikes there.

The term light car was used in the 1910s and 1920s in the United States to describe a cyclecar that had been improved with conventional automobile components, but was not a classification.

== History ==
A paragraph in the Autocar Handbook, sixth edition (1914) states:

As a matter of fact no definition of a light car exists beyond the fact that the R.A.C. (Royal Automobile Club) has so far limited the size of engine for light cars in trails [an early form of rallying]) to 1400cc.

It goes on to state:

Nor indeed would it be very easy to devise a definition since there is between the light car and the large car no great gulf fixed, but merely a line of demarcation.

A specification for the light car was promulgated in 1912 by the ACU, by which engine capacity was limited to 1,500 cc (91.5 cu in). Also in 1912, cars in Europe with engines smaller than 1,100 cc (67 cu in) were classified for motor sport purposes as cyclecars.

In October 1913 the British Temple Press, the publisher of various vehicle magazines, launched a magazine called The Light Car and Cyclecar, later shortened to The Light Car. It was on sale every Friday and cost 3d, but it ceased publication many years ago. This magazine covered topics on the range of cars used by the 'average motorist'.

== Examples ==
- Ageron – French light car produced between 1910 and 1914
- Econoom – Dutch light car produced between 1913 and 1915

== See also ==
- Car classification
- Vehicle size class
- Subcompact car
- Compact car
- Mid-size car
- Cyclecar
- Microcar
