= Motoemil =

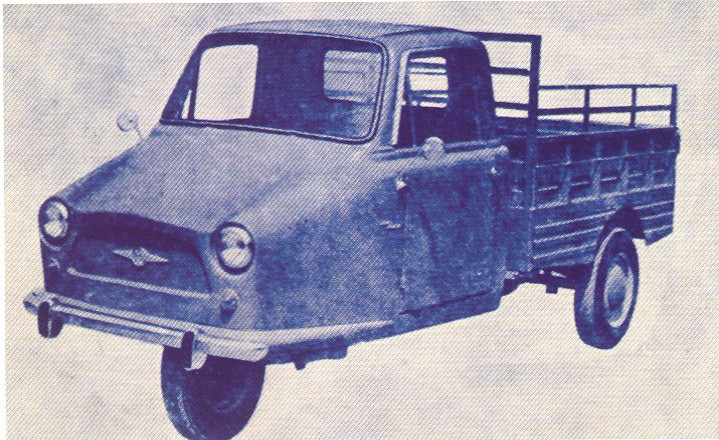
Motoemil three-wheel truck (1967 model)

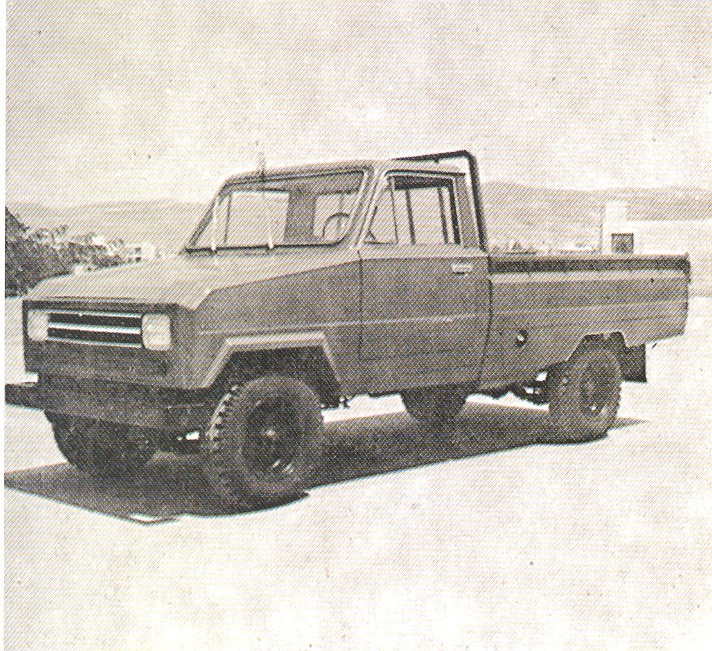
Motoemil Autofarma 4x4 (1977 model)

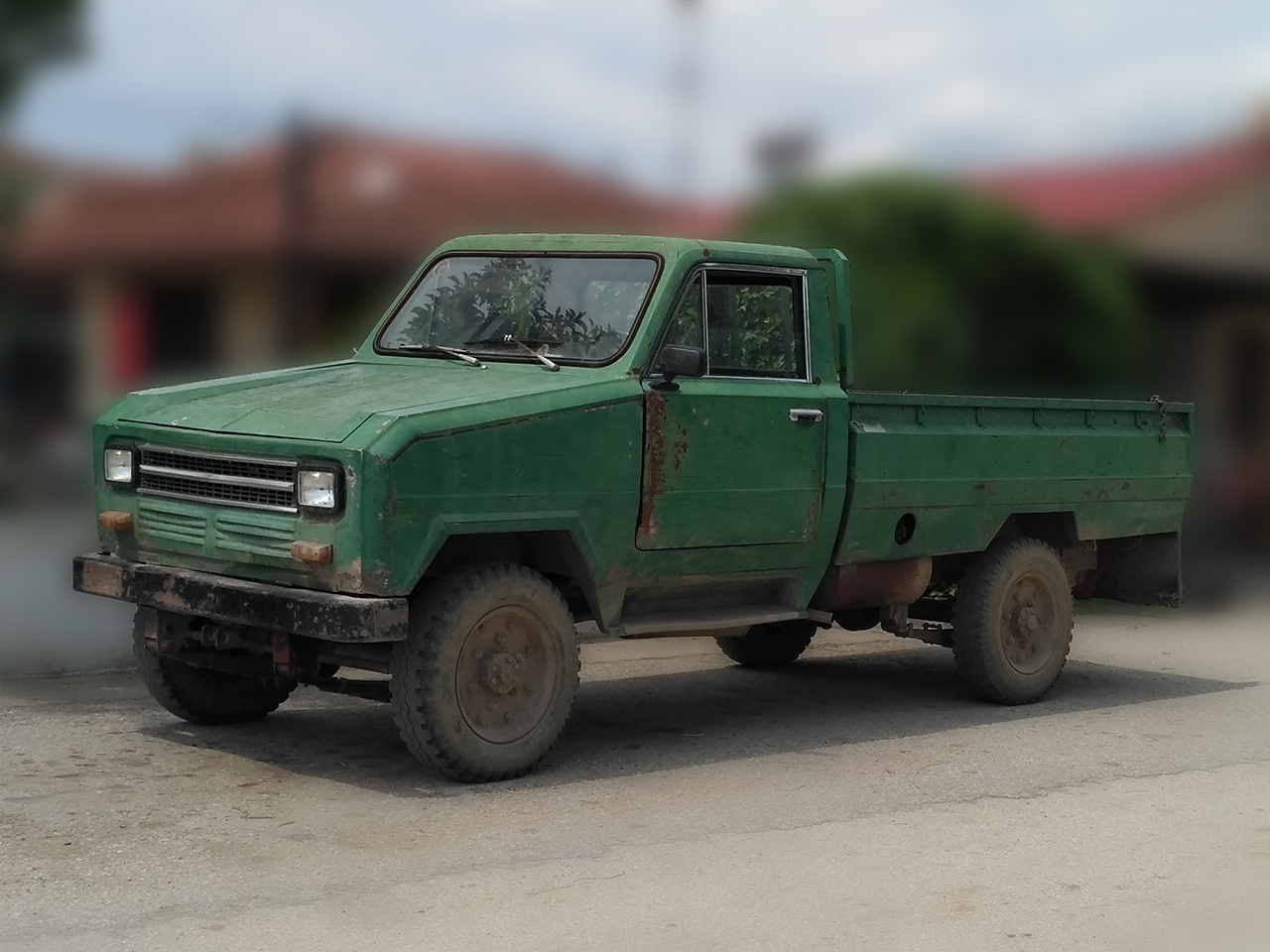
Motoemil Autofarma 4x4

Motoemil was a Greek truck manufacturer based in Thessaloniki (now producing trailers under the name Emilios Trailers). It was named after Emilios Antoniades who started his business, together with his brother Konstantinos, by constructing crude-made trucks assembled from motorcycle and automobile parts. By the mid-1960s, like other similar Greek manufacturers (see also Styl Kar), they were already developing and building complete "automobile" three-wheeler trucks. Motoemil was one of the first of its kind in Northern Greece and soon became the largest in that region, its products sold throughout the country. The first models used 1200cc Volkswagen air-cooled engines. A completely redesigned, more modern-looking model was introduced in 1970, using a German Ford engine.

Motoemil was one of the few Greek producers that survived the end of the "three-wheeler era" in that country, as it had developed a completely new breed of heavier, four-wheel trucks in the mid-1970s. The Autofarma model was an all-terrain 4x4 truck with 2 tonne payload and a Mercedes-Benz Diesel engine, perfectly placed in the "farm truck" category according to Greek law. In that respect, it was similar to other Greek vehicles (all locally developed), like the Agricola, the AutoDiana Unicar, the Balkania Autotractor, the EBIAM, the Petropoulos Polytrak and others. However, the Autofarma was produced in numbers exceeding those of all others combined, sold through a network of dealers throughout the country. It was simultaneously a very rugged, reliable all-terrain vehicle requiring minimal maintenance costs (suited for the extremely harsh treatment farm vehicles were exposed to), with a significant payload, a relatively comfortable cabin and a reasonably smooth road behavior for longer drives. A minor facelift was done on the model in 1979, but by the mid-1980s this category of vehicles was not competitive anymore due to changes in Greek Law combined with more "sophisticated" demands of Greek customers, met by competitively priced imported types. This was a change the Northern Greek company was not able to cope with, ceasing all truck production in 1985. For one more time, though, it was able to adjust to market opportunities, switching to development and production of light (mostly for boat transport) and heavier trailers. The company name was subsequently changed to Emilios Trailers under which it successfully operates to date.
