= EBIAM =

Greek truck manufacturer

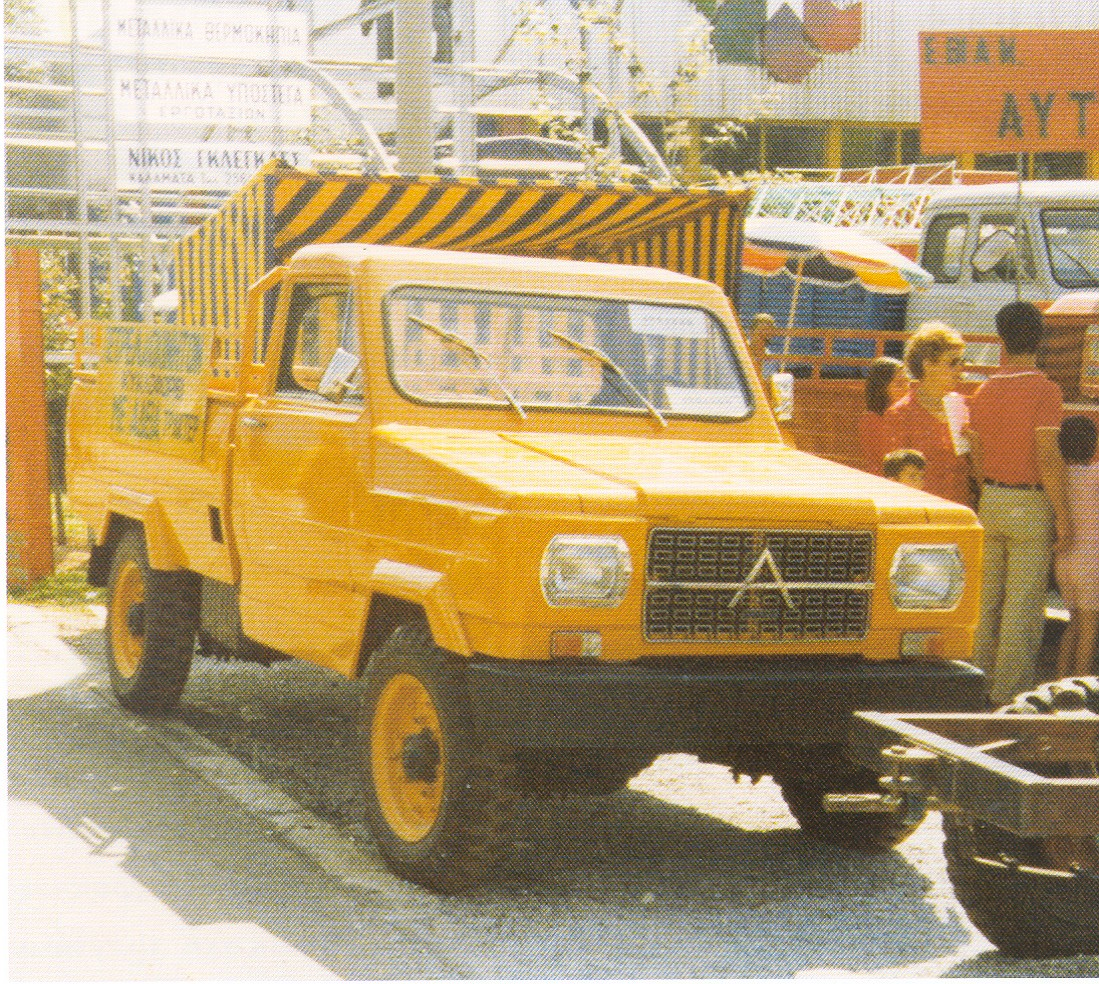
EBIAM 4x4 truck (1979), typical of Greek style of the late 1970s.

EBIAM (standing for Elliniki Biomichania Agrotikon Michanimaton, English translation: Greek Agricultural Machinery Industry) was a Greek company based in Thessaloniki that, among others, produced 4x4 trucks. It belonged to a generation that benefited from a Greek law (modified in the mid-1980s) classifying any vehicle that could be used for agricultural purposes (including "proper" trucks and jeeps) as "agricultural machinery".

Apart from tractors, there were different categories of vehicles that were developed and produced in Greece, classified according to the aforementioned law. The most common type was a "half tractor-half truck" contraption, usually with three-wheel chassis, that has been very characteristic of the country being a very common sight in the Greek countryside, especially in the 1970s. Companies that produced this type of vehicle include Candia (by far the largest), Kronos, Minos, Minotauros and others in Crete, Demetra in Volos, and several others. Another type was a family of lighter (500 kg – 1 tn payload) 4-wheel "jeep-type" trucks that were also supposed to be used as tractors. This type was produced by companies including Demetra in Volos, Diana in Athens (not to be confused with AutoDiana of Thessaloniki), Record in Herakleion, Crete, and others. Finally, another category included more advanced designs of heavier trucks, often with 4x4 chassis. This type was produced by a number of companies including (except for EBIAM), Agroamax in Arta, Agrocar in Athens, and others.

EBIAM produced between 1979 and 1984 two truck models on the same, robust 4x4 chassis it developed. Both models used a Land Rover 2300 cc 55 hp (41 kW) engine; payload was 1,500 kg (3,307 lb).
