= Candia =

The name Candia can refer to:

== People ==
- The House of Candia, a noble family from Savoy (14th-16th)
- Alfredo Ovando Candía, 56th president of Bolivia
- Antoinette Candia-Bailey, American academic administrator
- Cecilia Maria de Candia, British-Italian writer
- César di Candia, Uruguayan journalist and writer
- Christian di Candia, Uruguayan politician, Mayor of Montevideo
- Elia del Medigo de Candia (1458–1493), philosopher and Talmudist
- Giovanni Matteo Mario, opera singer, Italian marquis Giovanni de Candia
- Giulia Grisi, opera singer, Italian marchese Juliette de Candia
- José Pedro Montero de Candia, former president of Paraguay
- Joseph Solomon Delmedigo de Candia (1591–1655), scientist and philosopher
- Pedro de Candia, Greek explorer of the Americas

== Places ==
- The Venetian name for Heraklion, Crete, or the island itself, used until the 20th century in English
- Kingdom of Candia, the island of Crete as a colony of the Republic of Venice
- Candia Canavese, comune in Italy
- Candia Lomellina, comune in Italy
- Candia, New Hampshire, town in the United States

== Companies ==
- Candia (vehicles), a Greek agricultural machinery manufacturer
- Candia, a French dairy product brand owned by Liban Lait

== Other uses ==
- Candia (ship), a ship of the Dutch East India Company
