= 2024 French legislative election in Gard =

Following the first round of the 2024 French legislative election on 30 June 2024, runoff elections in each constituency where no candidate received a vote share greater than 50 percent were scheduled for 7 July. Candidates permitted to stand in the runoff elections needed to either come in first or second place in the first round or achieve more than 12.5 percent of the votes of the entire electorate (as opposed to 12.5 percent of the vote share due to low turnout).

== Gard ==
=== 1st constituency ===
Candidate	Party or alliance		First round		Second round	
Candidate	Party or alliance		Votes	%	Votes	%
Yoann Gillet	National Rally		24,894	43.91	28,259	54.22
Charles Menard	New Popular Front	La France Insoumise	16,747	29.54	23,856	45.78
Valérie Rouverand	Ensemble	Renaissance	11,394	20.10		
Loumy Bourghol	The Republicans		3,076	5.43		
Isabelle Leclerc	Far-left	Lutte Ouvrière	587	1.04		
Total			56,698	100.00	52,115	100.00
Valid votes			56,698	97.87	52,115	90.74
Invalid votes			364	0.63	1,299	2.26
Blank votes			870	1.50	4,021	7.00
Total votes			57,932	100.00	57,435	100.00
Registered voters/turnout			90,362	64.11	90,395	63.54

=== 2nd constituency ===
Candidate	Party or alliance		Votes	%
Nicolas Meizonnet	National Rally		34,427	52.79
Katy Guyot	New Popular Front	Socialist Party	15,727	24.11
Sophie Pellegrin-Ponsole	Ensemble	Horizons	9,300	14.26
Catherine Bolle	The Republicans		4,155	6.37
Véronique Jullian	Ecologists	Union of Democrats and Independents (Note: Dissident who ran without the backing of Ensemble)	1,130	1.73
Stéphane Manson	Far-left	Lutte Ouvrière	478	0.73
Total			65,217	100.00
Valid votes			65,217	97.86
Invalid votes			456	0.68
Blank votes			968	1.45
Total votes			66,641	100.00
Registered voters/turnout			96,319	69.19

=== 3rd constituency ===
Candidate	Party or alliance		First round		Second round	
Candidate	Party or alliance		Votes	%	Votes	%
Pascale Bordes	National Rally		31,465	47.48	35,685	58.68
Sabine Oromi	New Popular Front	Communist Party	15,246	23.01	25,133	41.32
Christian Baume	Ensemble	Horizons	12,727	19.21		
Florent Grau	The Republicans		5,988	9.04		
Valéry Fourmi	Far-left	Lutte Ouvrière	640	0.97		
Christophe Prévost	Regaionalists	Independent	199	0.30		
Daniel Jean	Miscellaneous right	Independent	0	0.00		
Total			66,265	100.00	60,818	100.00
Valid votes			66,265	97.39	60,818	90.27
Invalid votes			497	0.73	1,476	2.19
Blank votes			1,280	1.88	5,078	7.54
Total votes			68,042	100.00	67,372	100.00
Registered voters/turnout			95,926	70.93	95,973	70.20

=== 4th constituency ===
Candidate	Party or alliance		First round		Second round	
Candidate	Party or alliance		Votes	%	Votes	%
Pierre Meurin	National Rally		31,366	48.69	35,144	57.64
Manuel Bompard	New Popular Front	Socialist Party	17,639	27.38	25,832	42.36
Nadia El Okki	Ensemble	Renaissance	10,538	16.36		
Pierre Martin	The Republicans		3,930	6.10		
Jérôme Garcia	Far-left	Lutte Ouvrière	948	1.47		
Total			64,421	100.00	60,976	100.00
Valid votes			64,421	97.30	60,976	92.18
Invalid votes			555	0.84	1,340	2.03
Blank votes			1,230	1.86	3,835	5.80
Total votes			66,206	100.00	66,151	100.00
Registered voters/turnout			95,047	69.66	95,045	69.60

=== 5th constituency ===
Candidate	Party or alliance		First round		Second round	
Candidate	Party or alliance		Votes	%	Votes	%
Alexandre Allegret-Pilot	Union of the far right	The Republicans	27,602	41.01	32,629	51.58
Michel Sala	New Popular Front	La France Insoumise	22,228	33.03	30,635	48.42
Catherine Daufès-Roux	Ensemble	Renaissance	10,362	15.40		
Léa Boyer	The Republicans		5,399	8.02		
Agnès Olinet	Far-left	Lutte Ouvrière	961	1.43		
Pierre-Frédéric Zieba	Miscellaneous right	Independent	752	1.12		
Emmanuel Espanol	Far-right	Independent	1	0.00		
Total			67,305	100.00	63,264	100.00
Valid votes			67,305	96.70	63,264	91.17
Invalid votes			705	1.01	1,654	2.38
Blank votes			1,590	2.28	4,473	6.45
Total votes			69,600	100.00	69,391	100.00
Registered voters/turnout			98,971	70.32	98,963	70.12

=== 6th constituency ===
Candidate	Party or alliance		First round		Second round	
Candidate	Party or alliance		Votes	%	Votes	%
Sylvie Josserand	National Rally		23,382	42.07	26,838	51.40
Nicolas Cadène	New Popular Front	The Ecologists	15,992	28.77	25,381	48.60
Aurélien Colson	Ensemble	Democratic Movement	11,521	20.73		
Clément Stévant	The Republicans		3,202	5.76		
Laura Affortit	Regaionalists	Independent	1,110	2.00		
Aîcha Terbèche	Far-left	Lutte Ouvrière	377	0.68		
Total			55,584	100.00	52,219	100.00
Valid votes			55,584	98.02	52,219	92.39
Invalid votes			327	0.58	1,070	1.89
Blank votes			797	1.41	3,232	5.72
Total votes			56,708	100.00	56,521	100.00
Registered voters/turnout			85,573	66.27	85,592	66.04
