= Château de Sales =

Ruined castle in France

Coordinates: 45°59′40″N 6°15′30″E

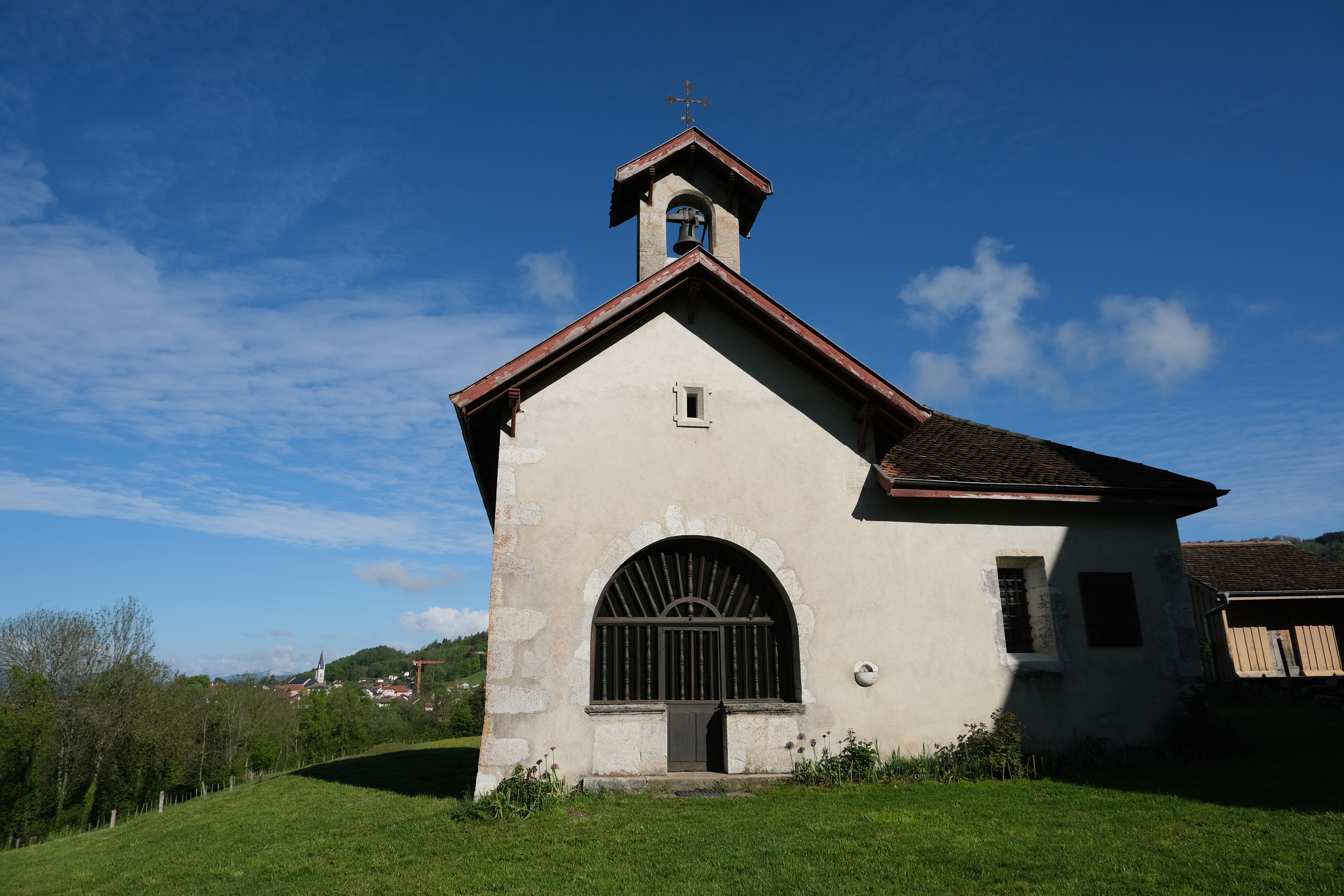
The chapel

The Château de Sales (French pronunciation: [ʃɑto d(ə) sal]) is a ruined castle in the commune of Thorens-Glières in the alpine Haute-Savoie department of France. It is often confused with the nearby Château de Thorens, also in Thorens-Glières.

== History ==
The Château de Sales was the home of the Sales family in Thorens until the beginning of the 17th century, when they built and moved to the Château de Thorens, a few hundred metres away, where they still reside.

The Château de Sales is known to have existed before 1249 and was remodelled in the 15th and 16th centuries. It was destroyed in 1630 on the orders of Louis XIII, during his invasion of Savoy. This was in reprisal for the resistance of Louis Sales, younger brother of Saint Francis de Sales, captain-governor of the Château d'Annecy. The latter had refused to surrender the Annecy castle to the King's troops, commanded by Gaspard III de Coligny, Maréchal de Châtillon.

In 1672, three nephews of Louis Sales, including Monseigneur Charles-Auguste de Sales, Prince-bishop of Geneva, built a chapel on the ruins of the Château de Sales, on the precise location of the room where Saint François de Sales had been born. In the 19th century, it was restored by the architect Ruphy for Count François de Roussy de Sales (1860–1943). A cellar was added in which were laid the ashes of his ancestors, until then buried in the church at Thorens (Saint Sébastien chapel).

This chapel has since been the necropolis of the Roussy de Sales family. The last count of Thorens, Jean-François de Roussy de Sales (1928-1999), grandson of count François, is buried there with the greater part of his ancestors.

Opposite the chapel, a cross shows visitors where Francis de Sales was inspired by God to create the Order of the Visitation of Holy Mary.

== See also ==
- Château de Thorens
- List of castles in France
