= Styl Kar =

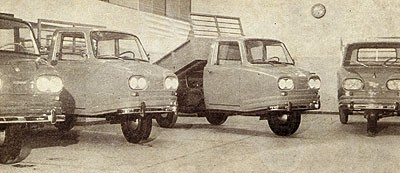
Styl Kar 1300 (1968 model) in a company showroom

STYL KAR (its logo written in Greek as ΣΤΥΛ ΚΑΡ) was named after its founder, the engineer Stylianos Karakatsanis. Its entire history is representative of many Greek companies who were engaged in the construction of simple utility vehicles.

== Evolution of the Greek three-wheel truck ==
The first transformations of motorcycles into "trucks" in the country probably took place in the early 1940s by workshops in Athens, when Greece was still under occupation by the Axis powers. Immediately after the war, many British (Norton, BSA), Italian (Moto Guzzi), and mostly German (Zündapp, BMW) motorcycles were left, along with destroyed U.S. Willys and other military vehicles. Involving a lot of engineering ingenuity, parts from different vehicles were joined together into contraptions being half-motorcycles, half-trucks, with remarkably efficient results. Soon, there was "production", with parts being more or less standardized. Progressively motorcycle parts were replaced by automobile parts, power most frequently being provided by Volkswagen air-cooled engines. By the late 1950s this process started evolving into complete development of three-wheeler trucks that had nothing to do with motorcycles (according to Greek law, though, three-wheelers did not fall into the same tax and other categories as four-wheel automobiles). STYL KAR is considered a pioneering company in the development of the Greek three-wheeler truck technology, adopted by other companies. It is also one of the few that evolved into a real industrial-scale manufacturer.

== The Styl Kar Story ==
Stylianos Karakatsanis started business in Thessaloniki after World War II repairing and selling ex-military motorcycles, and, soon transforming them into light trucks. During the 1950s he produced entire vehicles and by 1959 STYL KAR's first "classic" three-wheeler trucks were produced. In 1965 it moved to Athens, and new, more advanced designs were introduced. During the military dictatorship in Greece (1967–1974) laws for type certification were made more flexible, while three-wheelers enjoyed a favorable tax treatment. That resulted in the development of the industry, with companies (the smaller of which often using rebuilt engines and other parts) like STYL KAR, Alta, Ros, Apollon, Babis, Marz, SAM, MotorCar, Atlas, Motoemil, Pan-Car, Dinap, BIOMOT, Super Car, Mastraggelis, Simos, ETFA, Fall-Car, Ilion and others multiplying production, making this kind of vehicle common throughout the country. STYL KAR built a new, larger factory in 1967 and soon its most successful model, the 1300 (with Volkswagen air-cooled engine) was introduced. The company produced thousands of three-wheeler trucks, while in 1970 it developed a two-tonne four-wheel truck to replace the three-wheelers that were by that time becoming less appealing to the Greeks; this model, however, never reached production. Around the same time it developed a light sports car and worked on building a brand new factory in Thiva to produce it. However, a huge debt "discovered" by tax auditors (the company disputed it, claiming that it was due to an erroneous categorization of its activity) gave the final blow to a company that had progressively lost its basic market. All plans were abandoned and STYL KAR, the company that pioneered perhaps the most characteristic Greek vehicle, went out of business altogether.

== See also ==
- List of automobile manufacturers
- List of car brands
