= Château de Thorens =

Castle in Haute-Savoie, France

Coordinates: 45°59′37″N 6°15′20″E

The Château de Thorens is a castle in the commune of Thorens-Glières in the Haute-Savoie département of France. It is accessible from the north-east of Annecy by a road of about 20 km, going up to the plateau of Glières. It is often confused with the Château de Sales, which was formerly its neighbour of a few hundred metres but was destroyed on the order of King Louis XIII in 1630. Since the Liberation of France at the end of World War II, the castle has sometimes incorrectly been called Château de Thorens-Glières, based on the contemporary name of the commune, but it has always rightly been just de Thorens.

== History ==
At the exit of the village of Thorens-Glières, on the road of the famous plateau of Glières, the castle appears in proud silhouette in a beautiful mountainous setting. It is built on an ancient fort dating to 1060, built by the order of count Gérold de Genève, who bestowed it upon his faithful comrade in arms, Lord Odon de Compey.

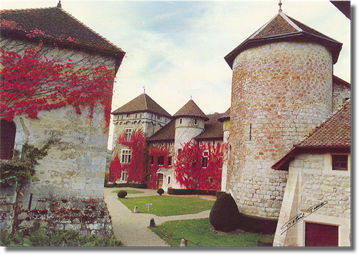
Main courtyard of the Château de Thorens

The castle was confiscated by the duke of Savoie in 1479. Many crimes, abuses and executions were reported to have been committed by the lords of Compey and so the castle was offered of Hélène de Luxembourg, the spouse of prince Janus de Savoie, duke of Genève. Hélène was, however, not interested in Thorens; her daughter Louise de Savoie, who married her cousin François de Luxembourg, inherited the Château de Thorens.

Later, in 1559, Thorens was sold to Sébastien II de Luxembourg and Lord François de Sales de Boisy, father of Saint François de Sales. The Lord de Sales already owned the Château de Sales, located a few hundred metres from the Château de Thorens. Pledged also to the lords of Compey, initially, the Château de Sales thus came to the keeping of the princes of Luxembourg. The Lord de Sales occupied the prestigious charge of maître d'hôtel of the residence of prince Sébastien II. In the 17th century, the very old family of Sales, originating from La Roche-sur-Foron, saw a fast rise, occupied the highest charges at the House of Savoy in Turin and went from the titles of baron to those of count and finally marquis.

Abused during the French invasion of Savoy in 1792, the Château de Thorens was restored in the 19th century by the marquise Alexandrine de Sales, helped by her grandson, count Eugène de Roussy de Sales. Today, the family of Roussy de Sales, headed by Félix-Léonard de Roussy de Sales, inhabits the castle year-round and undertakes its preservation.

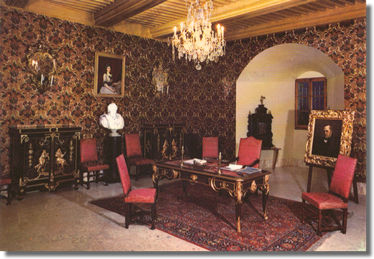
The desk of the prime minister Camille de Cavour. It bears the legend « C'est sur ce bureau que nous sommes devenus Français; c'est sur ce bureau qu'est née l'Italie unifiée » ("It is on this desk that we became French; it is on this desk that was born the unified Italy.")

The castle relates the life of Saint Francis de Sales and the family de Sales. Francis (1567–1622), prince-bishop of Geneva, was a multi-faceted character who was eminently famous for his humility. His life is illustrated by liturgical goldwork, seals, episcopal clothes, paintings, documents and rare books.

The count Camille Benso de Cavour (1810–1861) is another character who is inextricably linked with Thorens and stayed regularly in the castle with his cousins. When he was a prime minister for the Kingdom of Piémont-Sardaigne, Cavour concluded the risorgimento to the profit of the Savoy House, with the aid of his old friend, Emperor Napoleon III. Consequently, the county of Nice and the duchy of Savoy were annexed by France in the spring of 1860 by the Treaty of Annexation of March 24 (French: le traité d'Annexion du 24 mars). The Château de Thorens contains the personal effects of this statesman, his furniture, and his works of art; in particular, the sumptuous desk in the style of "Boulle Napoléon III" on which was signed the Treaty of Annexation.

Passing through the works of art; Flandres tapestries; masterpieces of paintings; and the furniture of the Italian Renaissance, the Baroque period and the Second French Empire, the visitor finally enters the heart of the castle. This residence of the nobility, illuminated with the golden light of a salon, shows the finesse of 17th century tastes. The arched kitchen (1632) gives a hint of the feasts that filled this period. The austere arched rooms of the inner fortifications evoke the life of men-at-arms, and the keep recalls the seigniorial justice system.

== Tourism ==
The Château de Thorens can be visited

- From April 1 to June 30: Saturdays, Sundays, and public holidays from 14:00 to 18:00 hours, for individual visitors;
- From September 1 to October 31: Saturdays and Sundays from 14:00 to 18:00 hours, for individual visitors;
- From July 1 to August 31: every day from 14:00 to 19:00 hours, for individual visitors;
- All the year for groups, excepted December 25 and January 1 (reservations needed).

The visit includes the keep, the staff waiting rooms of the 12th and 13th centuries, the kitchen with its imposing chimneys, the living rooms, the salons and the offices richly furnished and decorated with works gathered from the time of the Italian Renaissance to Napoleon III. The garden also forms a part of the protected monuments.

== See also ==
- List of castles in France
- History of Savoy
- Château de Sales
