= Candia (vehicles) =

Greek agricultural equipment company

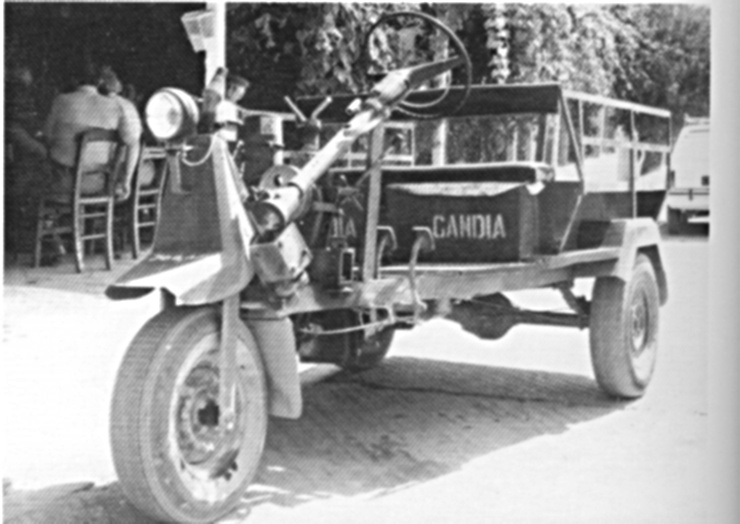
Candia Farm Vehicle

Candia is a Greek company producing Agricultural machinery and equipment, based in Herakleion, Crete. It is representative of many companies in this country (and especially on that island), that produced multi-purpose light farm vehicles.

A particular family of vehicles that seems to be a characteristic Greek development starting in the mid-1960s, was a light farm tractor-truck combination usually on three-wheel chassis, with or without cab. Some were constructed by smaller companies, or even small workshops, but a number of more significant companies evolved, especially in Crete (where they are called "skaftikies"), including (except for Candia) Record, Kronos, Knossos, Minos, Minotavros, Talos, Jupiter etc.; other companies included Demetra in Volos, Diana, Standard, Zeus Hellas in Athens, and many others. Engines used included Sachs, Ilo, local models by Mekmotors (Ruggerini licence), Petropoulos, Malkotsis etc. By the early 1980s this kind of vehicle was so widespread, that had become characteristic of the Greek countryside.

Candia was one of the few that became true industrial producers, turning out thousands of vehicles sold throughout the country, in addition to "classic" walking tractors. It built many models, usually with Sachs or Ilo engines, the most popular of which was a rugged three-wheel chassis combining truck and tractor functions.

This type of vehicle was considered obsolete by new buyers, already by the early 1990s, and most companies either closed down or (as in the case of Candia) diverted to other farm equipment.

== Related links ==
- History of Minotavros, a similar company in Crete
