= Alexandre Allegret-Pilot =

French politician (born 1989)

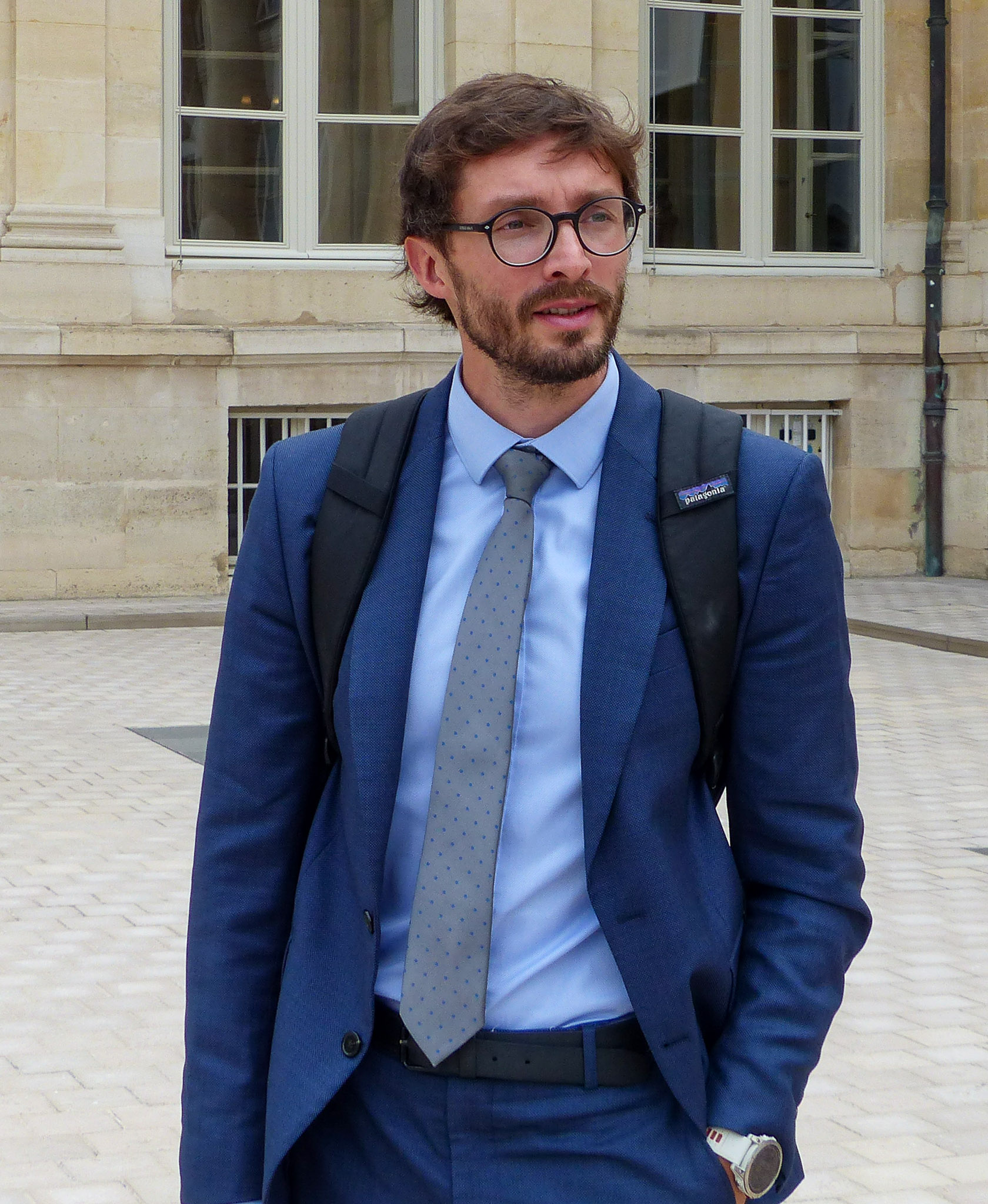

Member of the National Assembly for Gard's 5th constituency
- Incumbent
- Assumed office 8 July 2024
- Preceded by: Michel Sala

Personal details
- Born: 11 January 1989 (age 37) Évires, France
- Party: Union of the Right for the Republic (2024–present)
- Other political affiliations: The Republicans (2022–2024)
- Education: Aix-Marseille University; ESSEC Business School; Paris 1 Panthéon-Sorbonne University; École nationale d'administration
- Occupation: Civil servant

Alexandre Allegret-Pilot (French pronunciation: [alɛksɑ̃dʁ aleɡʁɛpilo]; born 11 January 1989) is a French politician and civil servant who has represented the 5th constituency of Gard in the National Assembly since 2024. He is a member of the Union of the Right for the Republic (UDR).

== Early life and career ==
Allegret-Pilot was born in Évires. He graduated from the École nationale d'administration and Aix-Marseille University, and was employed at the Ministry of Economics. He was elected municipal councillor of Fillière in 2020, and was a candidate for the 2020 Senate election and the 2021 departmental election in Haute-Savoie.
