= Bishopric of Geneva =

Bishopric of Geneva may refer to:

- Diocese of Geneva (400–1801), the spiritual jurisdiction of the Catholic bishops of Geneva
- Prince-Bishopric of Geneva, the secular jurisdiction of the bishops after 1154
