= Gard's 5th constituency =

Constituency of the National Assembly of France

5th constituency of Gard
- inline Constituency of the National Assembly of France

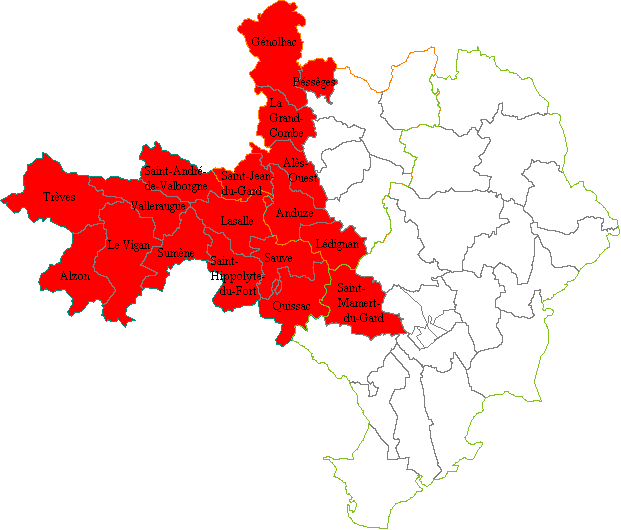
- Location of constituency in Department

- Deputy: Alexandre Allegret-Pilot; LR (UXD)
- Department: Gard

The 5th constituency of Gard is a French legislative constituency in the Gard département.

== Deputies ==
Election	Member	Party
2012	William Dumas	PS
2017	Olivier Gaillard	LREM
2021	Catherine Daufès-Roux	LREM
2022	Michel Sala	LFI
2024	Alexandre Allegret-Pilot	UXD

== Election results ==
=== 2024 ===
Candidate	Party	Alliance	First round			Second round		
Candidate	Party	Alliance	Votes	%	+/–	Votes	%	+/–
Alexandre Allegret-Pilot	LR-RN	UXD	27,602	41.02	new	32,629	51.58	new
Michel Sala	LFI	NFP	22,228	33.03	-0.45	30,635	48.42	-4.58
Catherine Daufès-Roux	RE	Ensemble	10,354	15.39	-5.77			
Léa Boyer	LR	UDC	5,399	8.02	+0.22			
Agnès Olinet	LO		961	1.43	-0.03			
Nordine Tria	DVD		752	1.12				
Emmanuel Espanol	EXD		1	0.00				
Votes			67,297	100.00		63,264	100.00	
Valid votes			67,297	96.68	-0.86	63,264	91.17	+4.54
Blank votes			1,546	2.22	+0.42	4,473	6.45	-3.64
Null votes			762	1.09	+0.43	1,654	2.38	-0.90
Turnout			69,605	70.33	+19.18	69,391	70.12	+19.26
Abstentions			29,366	39.67	-19.18	29,572	29.88	-19.26
Registered voters			98,971			98,963		
Result			UXD GAIN FROM LFI					

=== 2022 ===
Legislative Election 2022: Gard's 5th constituency
Party	Candidate	Votes	%	±%
LFI (NUPÉS)	Michel Sala	16,451	33.48	+1.04
RN	Jean-Marie Launay	11,582	23.57	+4.57
LREM (Ensemble)	Catherine Daufès-Roux	10,399	21.16	−11.60
LR (UDC)	Léa Boyer	3,834	7.80	−2.62
R!	Antoine Capaldi	1,977	4.02	N/A
REC	Frédérique Bozec	1,918	3.90	N/A
DVE	Catherine Rocco	1,181	2.40	N/A
Others	N/A	1,798	3.66	
Turnout		49,140	51.15	+0.04
2nd round result
LFI (NUPÉS)	Michel Sala	23,001	53.00	N/A
RN	Jean-Marie Launay	20,394	47.00	+10.57
Turnout		43,395	50.86	+6.57
LFI gain from LREM				

=== 2017 ===
Candidate	Label	First round		Second round	
Candidate	Label	Votes	%	Votes	%
Olivier Gaillard	REM	15,620	32.76	23,268	63.57
Daniela de Vido	FN	9,057	19.00	13,337	36.43
Guillaume Roiron	FI	6,204	13.01		
Léa Boyer	LR	4,968	10.42		
Jean-Michel Suau	PCF	4,516	9.47		
Nelly Frontanau	PS	2,743	5.75		
Benjamin Deceuninck	ECO	2,005	4.21		
André Baniol	DLF	778	1.63		
Didier Bonnet	ECO	484	1.02		
Agnès Olinet	EXG	462	0.97		
Sophie Prunier-Duparge	DIV	335	0.70		
Serge Gramond	DVG	254	0.53		
Bernard Vire	EXG	214	0.45		
Éric Muret	DVG	35	0.07		
Patrick Chevalier	DVD	0	0.00		
Vincent Rivet-Martel	ECO	0	0.00		
Votes		47,675	100.00	36,605	100.00
Valid votes		47,675	97.30	36,605	86.23
Blank votes		932	1.90	4,326	10.19
Null votes		389	0.79	1,518	3.58
Turnout		48,996	51.11	42,449	44.29
Abstentions		46,869	48.89	53,396	55.71
Registered voters		95,865		95,845	
Source: Ministry of the Interior

=== 2012 ===
2012 legislative election in Gard's 5th constituency
Candidate	Party	First round		Second round	
Candidate	Party	Votes	%	Votes	%
William Dumas	PS	18,287	31.85%	33,253	61.43%
Sybil Vergnes	FN	12,656	22.04%	20,882	38.57%
Jean-Charles Benezet	NC	10,459	18.22%		
Jean-Michel Suau	FG	9,446	16.45%		
Eric Doulcier	EELV	4,383	7.63%		
Henri Frances	MoDem	1,076	1.87%		
Sylvie Barbe		383	0.67%		
Richard Roudier		311	0.54%		
Olivier De Mauvaisin	LO	235	0.41%		
Alain Rivron	POI	162	0.28%		
Roselyne Dumas	AEI	17	0.03%		
Valid votes		57,415	98.21%	54,135	93.34%
Spoilt and null votes		1,045	1.79%	3,862	6.66%
Votes cast / turnout		58,460	62.56%	57,997	62.08%
Abstentions		34,980	37.44%	35,428	37.92%
Registered voters		93,440	100.00%	93,425	100.00%

=== 2007 ===
Legislative Election 2007: Gard's 5th constituency
Party	Candidate	Votes	%	±%
UMP	Christophe Ruas	22,593	38.50	
PS	William Dumas	15,275	26.03	
PCF	Jean-Michel Suau	5,542	9.44	
FN	Sylvie Sanchez	3,052	5.20	
MoDem	Michel Escatafal	2,418	4.12	
Far left	Michel Sala	1,876	3.20	
LV	Christine Jodra	1,617	2.76	
Far left	Roland Menard	1,419	2.42	
NM	Ariane Fournier	1,214	2.07	
Others	N/A	3,674		
Turnout		59,784	63.81	
2nd round result
PS	William Dumas	29,993	51.39	
UMP	Christophe Ruas	28,365	48.61	
Turnout		60,594	64.67	
PS hold				

=== 2002 ===
Legislative Election 2002: Gard's 5th constituency
Party	Candidate	Votes	%	±%
PS	Damien Alary	21,926	39.80	
UMP	Ariane Fournier	15,238	27.66	
FN	Henri Bunis	8,392	15.23	
CPNT	Jean-Bernard Ravel	1,736	3.15	
LV	Fayza Omar	1,153	2.09	
Others	N/A	6,645		
Turnout		56,731	67.19	
2nd round result
PS	Damien Alary	27,874	55.46	
UMP	Ariane Fournier	22,388	44.54	
Turnout		53,091	62.86	
PS hold				

=== 1997 ===
Legislative Election 1997: Gard's 5th constituency
Party	Candidate	Votes	%	±%
PS	Damien Alary	13,049	24.84	
RPR	Alain Danilet	12,137	23.10	
PCF	Jean-Michel Suau	9,429	17.95	
FN	Olivier Masson	8,718	16.60	
DVE	Georges Affortit	1,807	3.44	
LV	Roger Travier	1,602	3.05	
LO	Jean-Louis Estève	1,591	3.03	
DVD	Jean Bardot	1,195	2.27	
Others	N/A	3,005		
Turnout		55,503	71.13	
2nd round result
PS	Damien Alary	32,284	59.41	
RPR	Alain Danilet	22,053	40.59	
Turnout		58,759	75.32	
PS hold				
