= Olivier Gaillard =

French politician

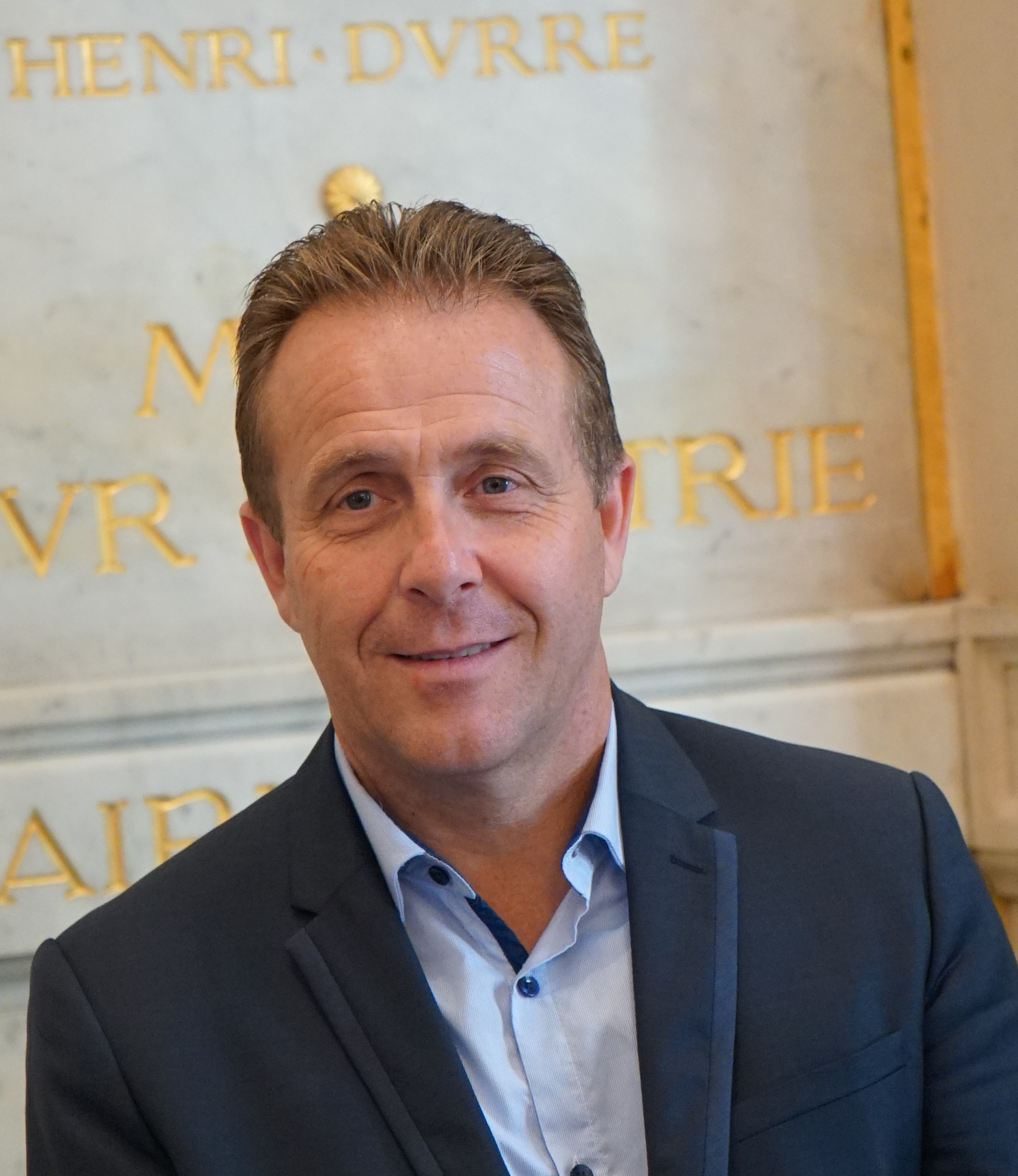

Member of the French National Assembly for Gard's 5th constituency
- In office 21 June 2017 – 26 June 2021
- Preceded by: William Dumas
- Succeeded by: Catherine Daufès-Roux

Personal details
- Born: 28 February 1967 (age 59) Nîmes, France
- Party: La République En Marche! (2017-2020)

Olivier Gaillard (born 28 February 1967 in Nîmes) is a French politician representing La République En Marche! (LREM). He was a member of the French National Assembly from 18 June 2017 to 26 June 2021, representing the 5th constituency of the department of Gard.

Having previously been an active member of the Socialist Party, Gaillard joined LREM in 2017.

In parliament, Gaillard served on the Finance Committee. In addition to his committee assignments, he was a member of the French-Ecuardorian Parliamentary Friendship Group.

In July 2019, Gaillard was one of nine LREM members who voted against his parliamentary group's majority and opposed the French ratification of the European Union’s Comprehensive Economic and Trade Agreement (CETA) with Canada. He left LREM in 2020.

Gaillard resigned from the Assembly to become mayor of Sauve.

== See also ==
- 2017 French legislative election
