= Balkania =

Balkania may refer to:

- Balkania (trade name), a trade name of a Greek industrial and trading company based in Athens
- Balkania (proposed state), a proposed new state in the Balkans
