= AutoDiana =

Greek truck manufacturer (1975–1984)

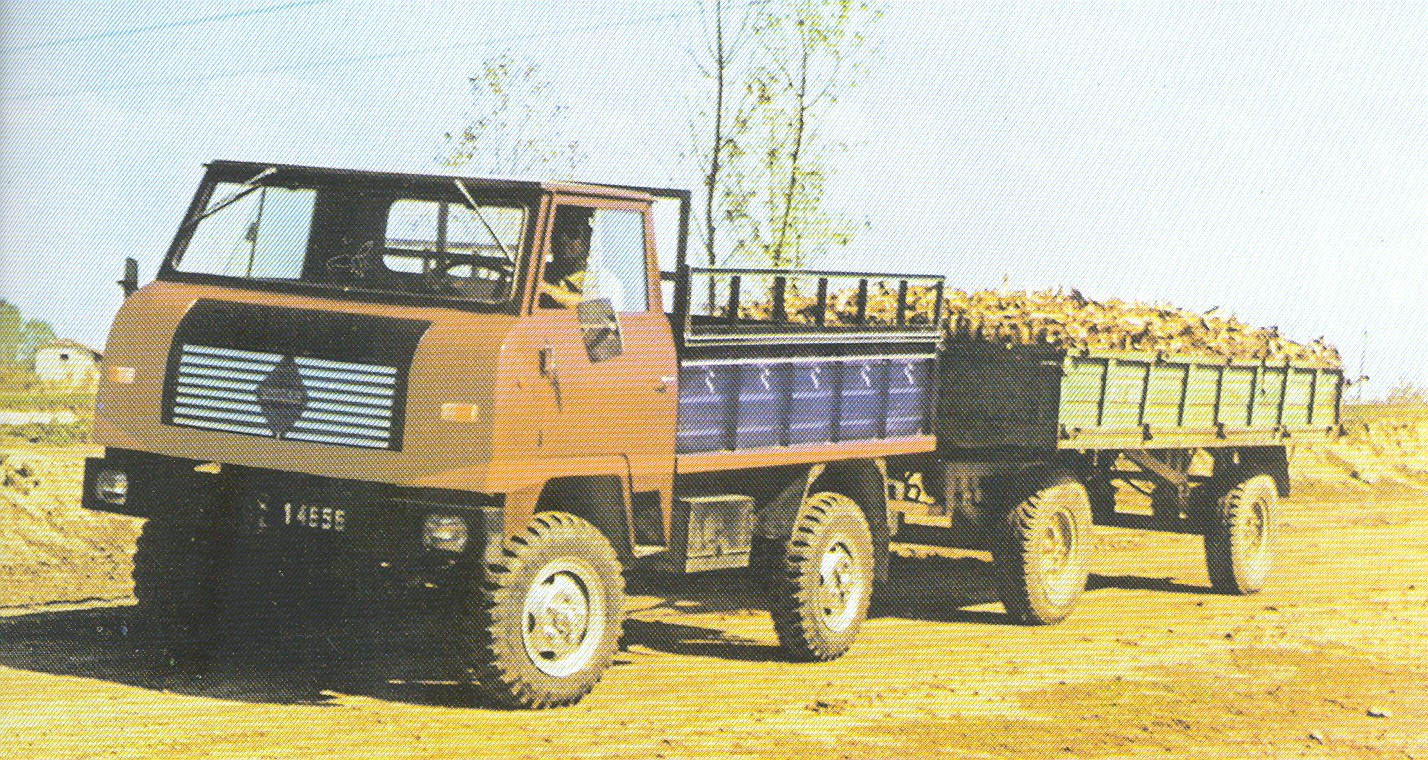
AutoDiana Unicar (1975)

AutoDiana was a Greek truck manufacturer based in Thessaloniki, in business between 1975 and 1984. Its main product was the 'Unicar' truck. This robust vehicle had a payload of 1500 kg and used a Mercedes-Benz Diesel engine and Dodge axles. Its fate, along with similar Greek multi-purpose trucks, such as Petropoulos Unitrak, the Agricola, the Motoemil Autofarma, the Balkania Autotractor, the Namco Agricar, was sealed when a change of Greek law in 1984 modified taxes and duties for such farm vehicles. Production was terminated the same year ending a career of reasonable sales among customers in the Greek countryside.
