= Saint-Martin-Bellevue =

Saint-Martin-Bellevue San-Martin (Savoyard)
- Part of Fillière
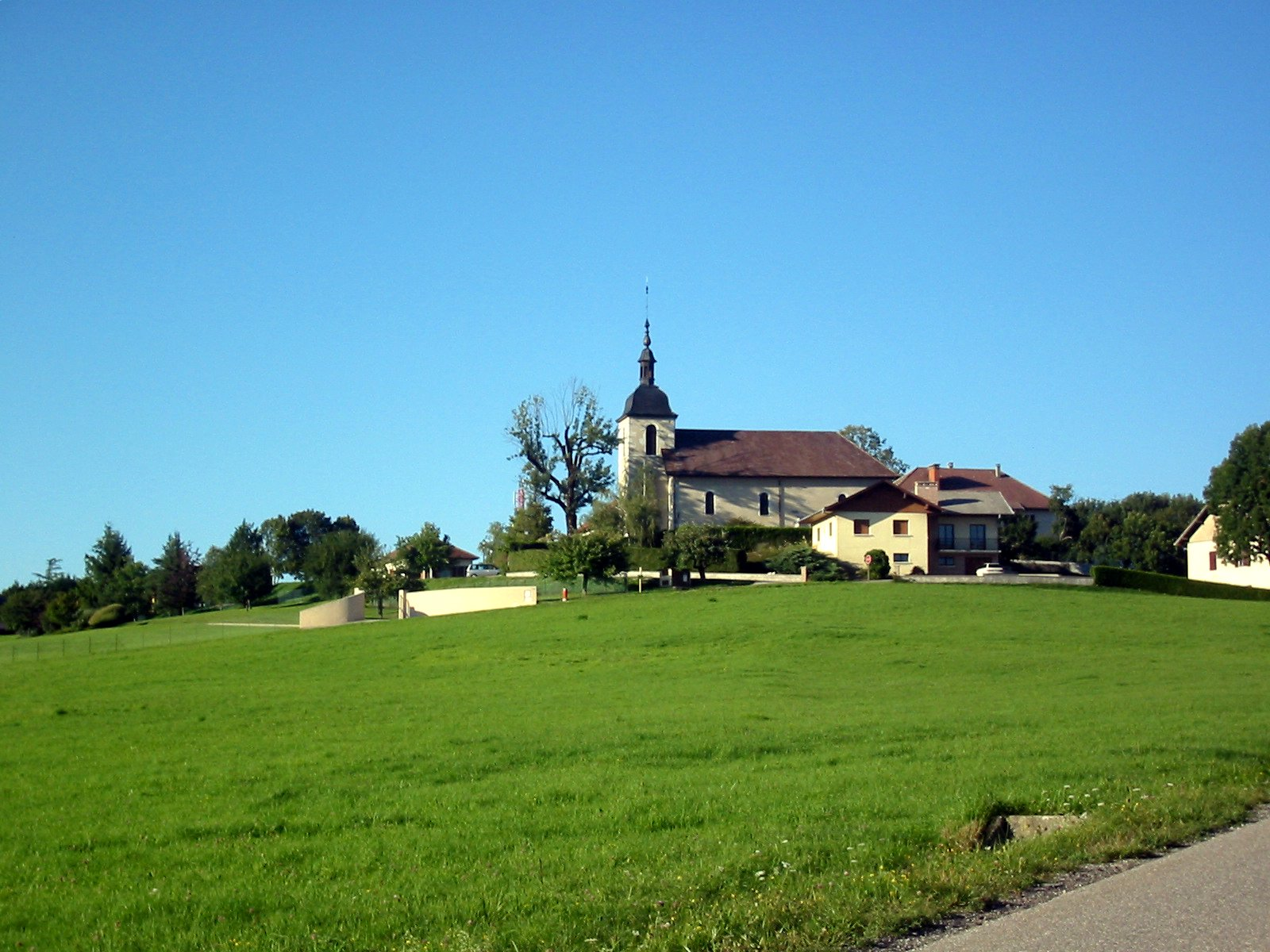
- A general view of Saint-Martin-Bellevue and the church

- Coat of arms
- Location of Saint-Martin-Bellevue
- Location within France Location within Auvergne-Rhône-Alpes
- Coordinates: 45°57′47″N 6°08′58″E
- Country: France
- Region: Auvergne-Rhône-Alpes
- Department: Haute-Savoie
- Arrondissement: Annecy
- Canton: Annecy-le-Vieux
- Commune: Fillière
- Area^{1}: 9.33 km^{2} (3.60 sq mi)
- Highest elevation: 764 m (2,507 ft)
- Lowest elevation: 489 m (1,604 ft)
- Population (2022): 3,151
  - Density: 338/km^{2} (875/sq mi)
- Time zone: UTC+01:00 (CET)
  - Summer (DST): UTC+02:00 (CEST)
- Postal code: 74370
- Website: Stmartin-bellevue.fr
- ^{1} French Land Register data, which excludes lakes, ponds, glaciers > 1 km^{2} (0.386 sq mi or 247 acres) and river estuaries.

Saint-Martin-Bellevue (French pronunciation: [sɛ̃ maʁtɛ̃ bɛlvy]; Savoyard: San-Martin) is a former commune in the Haute-Savoie department in the Auvergne-Rhône-Alpes region in southeastern France. On 1 January 2017, it merged with the new commune of Fillière.

== See also ==
- Communes of the Haute-Savoie department
