= Les Ollières =

Les Ollières Léz Olîre (Savoyard)
- Part of Fillière
- Coat of arms
- Location of Les Ollières
- Location within France Location within Auvergne-Rhône-Alpes
- Coordinates: 45°58′47″N 6°10′58″E
- Country: France
- Region: Auvergne-Rhône-Alpes
- Department: Haute-Savoie
- Arrondissement: Annecy
- Canton: Annecy-le-Vieux
- Commune: Fillière
- Area^{1}: 11.64 km^{2} (4.49 sq mi)
- Highest elevation: 794 m (2,605 ft)
- Lowest elevation: 489 m (1,604 ft)
- Population (2022): 1,043
  - Density: 89.60/km^{2} (232.1/sq mi)
- Time zone: UTC+01:00 (CET)
  - Summer (DST): UTC+02:00 (CEST)
- Postal code: 74370
- ^{1} French Land Register data, which excludes lakes, ponds, glaciers > 1 km^{2} (0.386 sq mi or 247 acres) and river estuaries.

Les Ollières (French pronunciation: [le.z‿ɔljɛʁ]; Savoyard: Léz Olîre) is a former commune in the Haute-Savoie department in the Auvergne-Rhône-Alpes region in south-eastern France. On 1 January 2017, it was merged into the new commune Fillière.

== See also ==
- Communes of the Haute-Savoie department
