= Aviernoz =

Aviernoz Avyêrno (Savoyard)
- Part of Fillière
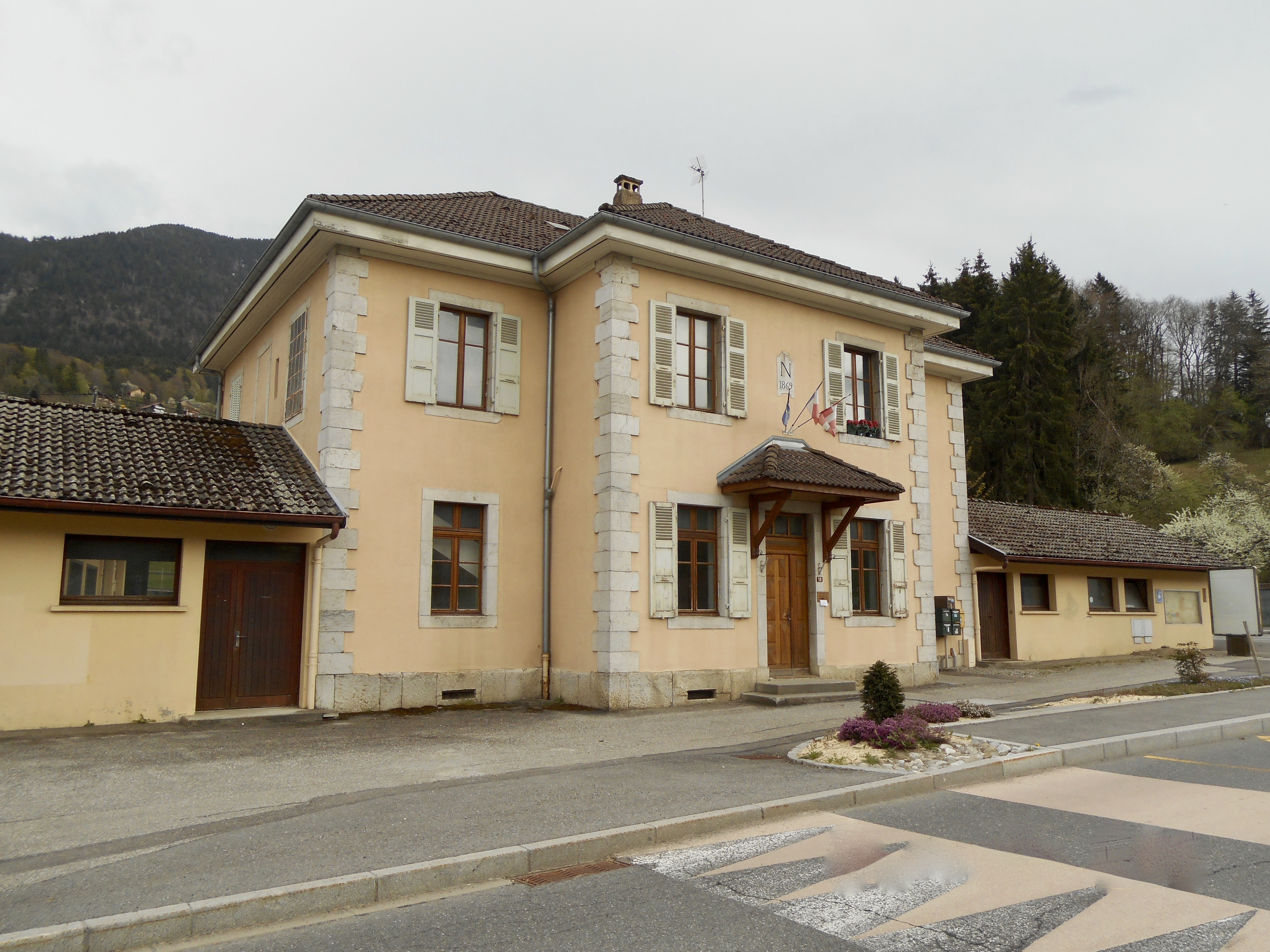
- Town hall
- Location of Aviernoz
- Location within France Location within Auvergne-Rhône-Alpes
- Coordinates: 45°58′44″N 6°13′25″E
- Country: France
- Region: Auvergne-Rhône-Alpes
- Department: Haute-Savoie
- Arrondissement: Annecy
- Canton: Annecy-le-Vieux
- Commune: Fillière
- Area^{1}: 15.90 km^{2} (6.14 sq mi)
- Highest elevation: 1,673 m (5,489 ft)
- Lowest elevation: 578 m (1,896 ft)
- Population (2022): 893
  - Density: 56.2/km^{2} (145/sq mi)
- Time zone: UTC+01:00 (CET)
  - Summer (DST): UTC+02:00 (CEST)
- Postal code: 74570
- ^{1} French Land Register data, which excludes lakes, ponds, glaciers > 1 km^{2} (0.386 sq mi or 247 acres) and river estuaries.

Aviernoz (French pronunciation: [avjɛʁno]; Savoyard: Avyêrno) is a former commune in the Haute-Savoie department in the Auvergne-Rhône-Alpes region in south-eastern France. On 1 January 2017, it was merged into the new commune Fillière.

== See also ==
- Communes of the Haute-Savoie department
