= Charvonnex =

Charvonnex Sharvoné (Savoyard)
- Commune
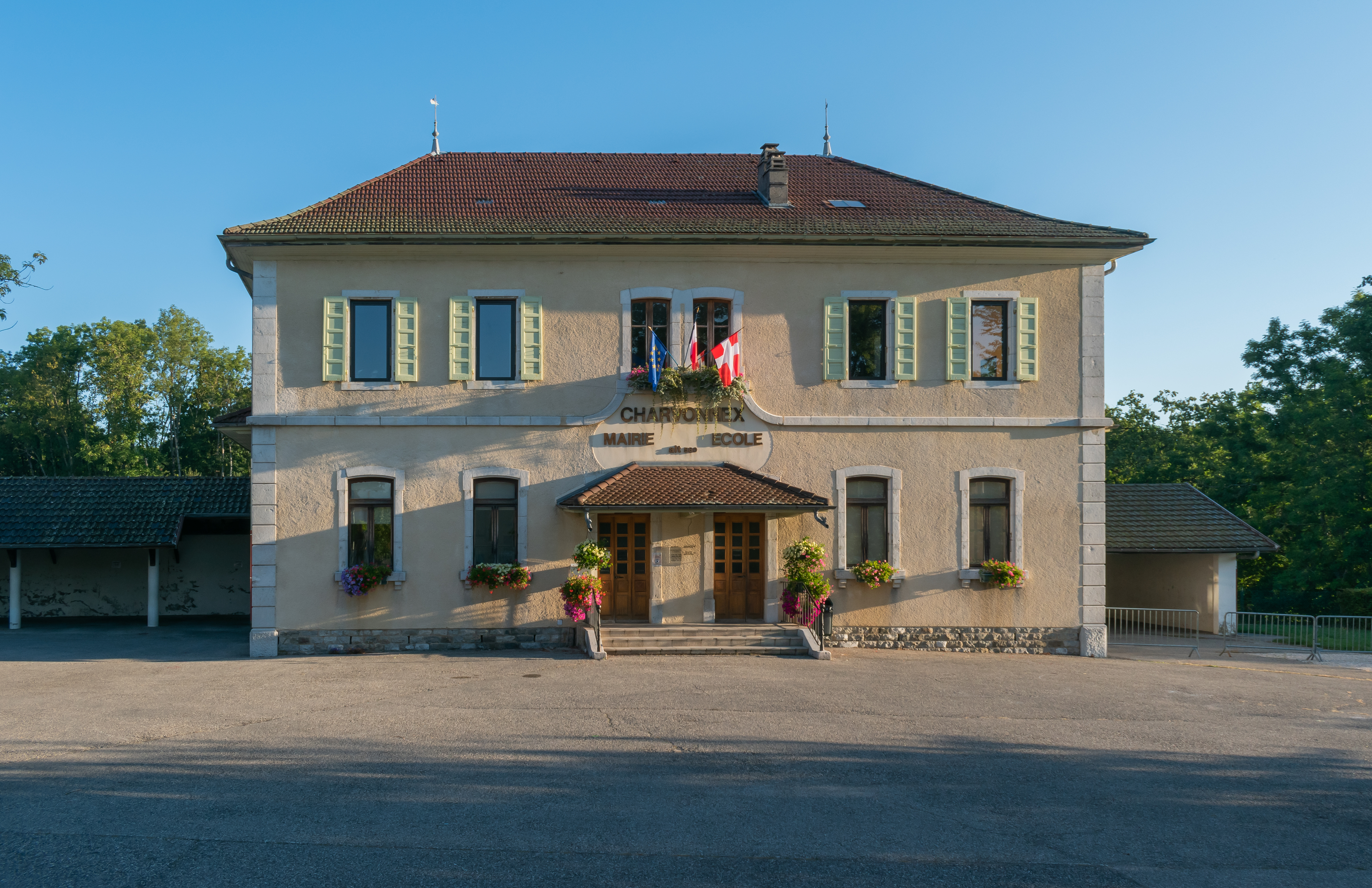
- Town hall

- Coat of arms
- Location of Charvonnex
- Location within France Location within Auvergne-Rhône-Alpes
- Coordinates: 45°58′40″N 6°09′28″E
- Country: France
- Region: Auvergne-Rhône-Alpes
- Department: Haute-Savoie
- Arrondissement: Annecy
- Canton: Annecy-3
- Intercommunality: CA Grand Annecy

Government
  - Mayor (2020–2026): Jean-François Gimbert
- Area^{1}: 4.71 km^{2} (1.82 sq mi)
- Highest elevation: 741 m (2,431 ft)
- Lowest elevation: 500 m (1,600 ft)
- Population (2023): 1,537
  - Density: 326/km^{2} (845/sq mi)
- Time zone: UTC+01:00 (CET)
  - Summer (DST): UTC+02:00 (CEST)
- INSEE/Postal code: 74062 /74370
- ^{1} French Land Register data, which excludes lakes, ponds, glaciers > 1 km^{2} (0.386 sq mi or 247 acres) and river estuaries.

Charvonnex (French pronunciation: [ʃaʁvɔne]; Savoyard: Sharvoné) is a commune in the Haute-Savoie department in the Auvergne-Rhône-Alpes region in south-eastern France.

== Toponymy ==
As with many polysyllabic Arpitan toponyms or anthroponyms, the final -x marks oxytonic stress (on the last syllable), whereas the final -z indicates paroxytonic stress (on the penultimate syllable) and should not be pronounced, although in French it is often mispronounced due to hypercorrection

== See also ==
- Communes of the Haute-Savoie department
