= Alain Danilet =

French politician

- Born: 3 June 1947; Noyon, France
- Died: 8 February 2012 (aged 64); Villevieille
- Occupation: Politician
- Known for: Mayor of Sommières

Alain Danilet (3 June 1947 – 8 February 2012) was a French politician who served as Mayor of Sommières from 2001 to 2005. He was previously Member of the Fifth District of the Gard from 1993 to 1997.

== Biography ==
Born in Noyon, Danilet was elected deputy of the fifth district of Gard in the colors of RPR for the Tenth Parliament (1993–1997). His deputy was Christian Burglé, Mayor CDS Euzet (1989–2001). He was close to the former deputy mayor of Beaucaire, Jean-Marie André. He represented the legislative elections of 1997, and failed the second round with 40.59% of the vote against Damien Alary. He also worked as a civil servant, and National Police officer.

Danilet was elected Mayor of Sommières in March 2001. He joined the ranks of the UMP upon its creation in 2002. In 2004, he tried to defeat Christian Valette (PS) of Sommières Township. In 2005, faced with the resignation of almost all of the city council, he lost his term as mayor and councilman. Guy Marotte succeeded him.

Danilet died in 2012 in Villevieille.
