= Ros (vehicles) =

1970 Ros 1500 truck

Ros (its badge was only in Greek, the brand spelled 'ΡΩΣ') was the trade name of vehicles produced by the Greek company 'Stavros Konstantinides O.E.', based in Athens. The Ros three-wheeler trucks were the most successful of its kind in Greece, having been produced by the thousands. Ros surpassed in sales even "Greek classics" like Alta and Styl Kar, and the characteristic shape of its trucks could be seen for several years in every corner of the country. And for good reason: The 'Rosaki' (meaning 'little Ros', as was fondly referred as by its owners) was one of the most robust and reliable vehicles ever used in Greece. In 2006, 30 years after the end of three-wheeler production, several Ros were still in use in excellent condition, more than any other three-wheeler type.

The company roots go back to imports of used German motorcycles after World War II by S. Konstantinides and transformation of motorcycles into crude trucks. The Alfa-Ros brand was introduced in 1966 when S. Konstantinides cooperated with A. Apostolopoulos, designing and producing 'proper' (unrelated to motorcycles) three-wheeler trucks. In 1968 A. Apostolopoulos made his own company (producing the Apollon truck, similar in appearance and almost as reliable) and thus S. Konstantinides continued with a new brand, Ros. The Ros trucks featured metal cabins and 1000cc and 1500cc engines. They were all front engined in contrast to most other rear-engined Greek three-wheelers. A relative of the company founder, Ilias Konstantinides also made his own Ilion brand producing Ros designs. Ros terminated production in 1976 when the type could no longer suit the needs of Greek professionals and competition from imported trucks became stiffer.
