= Groisy =

- Commune
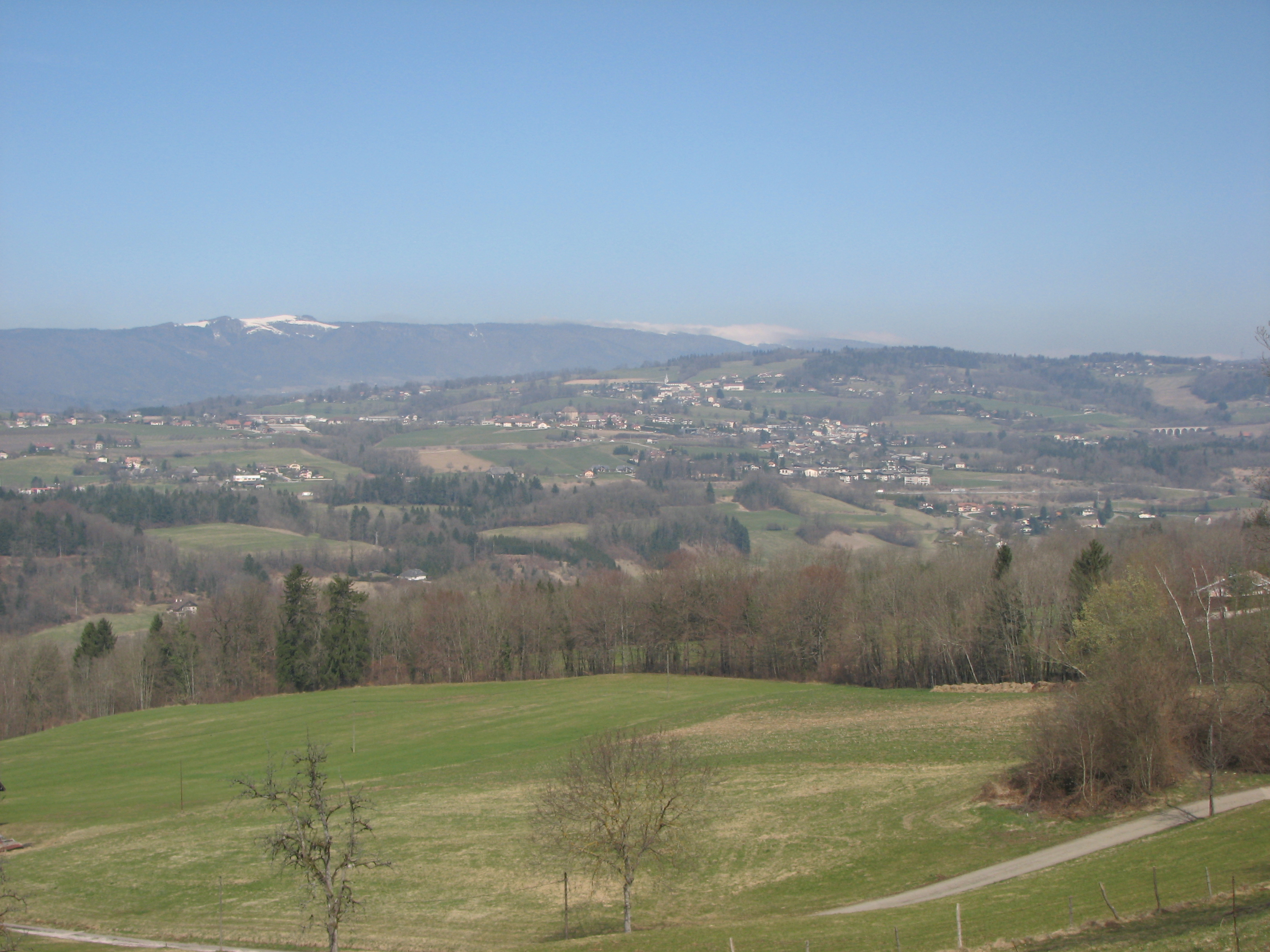
- Groisy seen from Les Ollières, with Mont Salève in the background

- Coat of arms
- Location of Groisy
- Location within France Location within Auvergne-Rhône-Alpes
- Coordinates: 46°01′09″N 6°10′20″E
- Country: France
- Region: Auvergne-Rhône-Alpes
- Department: Haute-Savoie
- Arrondissement: Annecy
- Canton: Annecy-3
- Intercommunality: CA Grand Annecy

Government
  - Mayor (2020–2026): Henri Chaumontet
- Area^{1}: 21.44 km^{2} (8.28 sq mi)
- Highest elevation: 874 m (2,867 ft)
- Lowest elevation: 529 m (1,736 ft)
- Population (2023): 4,082
  - Density: 190.4/km^{2} (493.1/sq mi)
- Demonym: Groisiliens / Groisiliennes
- Time zone: UTC+01:00 (CET)
  - Summer (DST): UTC+02:00 (CEST)
- INSEE/Postal code: 74137 /74570
- Website: Groisy.org
- ^{1} French Land Register data, which excludes lakes, ponds, glaciers > 1 km^{2} (0.386 sq mi or 247 acres) and river estuaries.

Groisy (French pronunciation: [ɡʁwazi]) is a commune in the Haute-Savoie department in the Auvergne-Rhône-Alpes region in south-eastern France.

== Population ==
Historical population
Year	Pop.	±% p.a.
1968	1,044	—
1975	1,207	+2.09%
1982	1,659	+4.65%
1990	2,190	+3.53%
1999	2,605	+1.95%
2007	2,906	+1.38%
2012	3,243	+2.22%
2017	3,629	+2.27%
2023	4,082	+1.98%
Source: INSEE

== See also ==
- Communes of the Haute-Savoie department
