= Dinap =

Dinap (ΔΗΝΑΠ, D. Apostolopoulos O.E.) was one of the smaller Greek machine and truck manufacturers with its factory on Liosion St., in Athens. The Dinap 1200 was a three-wheel truck produced in the second half of the 1960s. It was powered by a 1200cc, 34 hp (25 kW) air-cooled Volkswagen engine and could legally carry 1,000 kg (2,205 lb). This load was higher than the equivalent for most other three-wheel trucks, but this made little difference since those vehicles were frequently loaded with up to 3 tons.

== See also ==
- Styl Kar (overview of the three-wheeler era in Greece)
- Greek three wheelers including photo of a Dinap truck
