= Catherine Daufès-Roux =

French politician

Member of the National Assembly for Gard's 5th constituency
- In office 18 June 2021 – 21 June 2022
- Preceded by: Olivier Gaillard
- Succeeded by: Michel Sala

Personal details
- Born: Catherine Roux; 24 April 1963 (age 62) Alès, Gard, France
- Party: En Marche!

Catherine Daufès-Roux (née Roux; born 24 April 1963) is a French LREM politician who was Member of Parliament for Gard's 5th constituency from 28 June 2021 to June 2022.

== Biography ==
Daufès-Roux was born in Alès and worked as an assistant headteacher.

In the 2017 French legislative election she was the substitute candidate of Olivier Gaillard. She replaced him in Parliament when he became Mayor of Sauve.

She lost her seat in the first round of the 2022 French legislative election. The seat was won by Michel Sala of La France Insoumise (NUPES) in the second round.
