= Mastraggelis =

Mastraggelis three-wheeled truck (1968 model)

Mastraggelis was the brand name of the company founded by the Mastraggelis Brothers in Aigaleo (Athens), Greece. Mastraggelis became mostly known for its production of bus bodies, as well as other metal structures, but it also produced complete three-wheeled trucks between 1968 and 1974. The trucks, not particularly successful compared to other Greek three wheelers, could be distinguished by their characteristic cab design.
