= Fillière =

- Commune
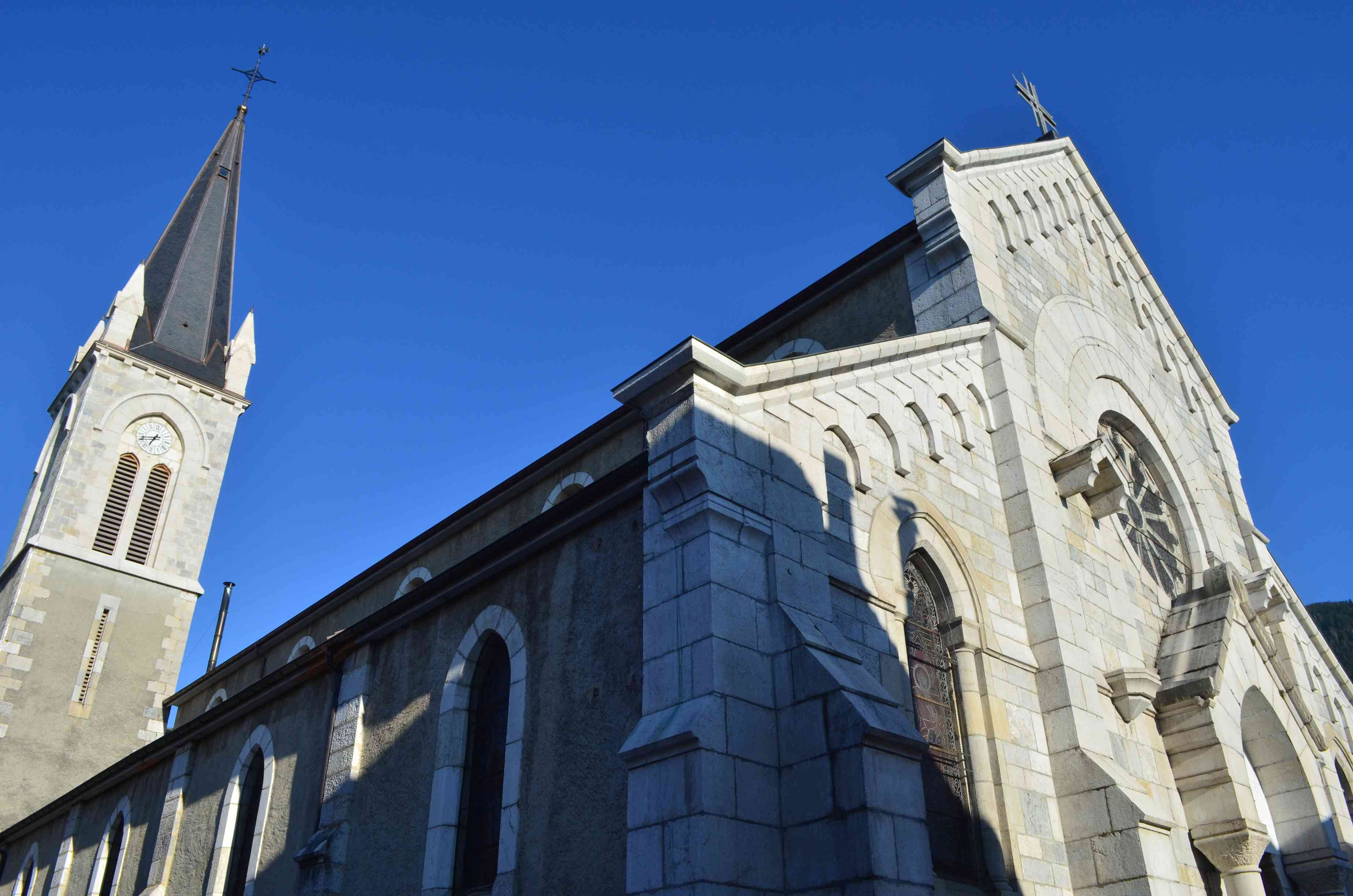
- The church of Thorens-Glières
- Location of Fillière
- Location within France Location within Auvergne-Rhône-Alpes
- Coordinates: 45°59′53″N 6°14′53″E
- Country: France
- Region: Auvergne-Rhône-Alpes
- Department: Haute-Savoie
- Arrondissement: Annecy
- Canton: Annecy-3
- Intercommunality: Grand Annecy

Government
  - Mayor (2020–2026): Christian Anselme
- Area^{1}: 119.41 km^{2} (46.10 sq mi)
- Population (2023): 10,075
  - Density: 84.373/km^{2} (218.53/sq mi)
- Time zone: UTC+01:00 (CET)
  - Summer (DST): UTC+02:00 (CEST)
- INSEE/Postal code: 74282 /74370, 74570
- ^{1} French Land Register data, which excludes lakes, ponds, glaciers > 1 km^{2} (0.386 sq mi or 247 acres) and river estuaries.

Fillière (French pronunciation: [filjɛʁ]) is a commune in the department of Haute-Savoie, southeastern France. The municipality was established on 1 January 2017 by merger of the former communes of Thorens-Glières (the seat), Aviernoz, Évires, Les Ollières and Saint-Martin-Bellevue.

== Population ==
Population data refer to the area corresponding with the commune as of January 2025.

Historical population
Year	Pop.	±% p.a.
1968	2,947	—
1975	3,489	+2.44%
1982	4,447	+3.53%
1990	5,492	+2.67%
1999	6,711	+2.25%
2007	8,142	+2.45%
2012	8,701	+1.34%
2017	9,255	+1.24%
2023	10,075	+1.42%
Source: INSEE

== See also ==
- Communes of the Haute-Savoie department
