= François de Candie =

Arms of de Candie family

François de Candie was a savoyard nobleman named Vidame of Geneva from 1377 to 1385 and captain of the castle of l'Ile sur le Rhône in 1377. In 1368, he received from princess Mathide of Savoy the lordship on the castles of Salagine in Bloye and Rumilly, Haute-Savoie.

== See also ==
- House of Candia
