= Candia (ship) =

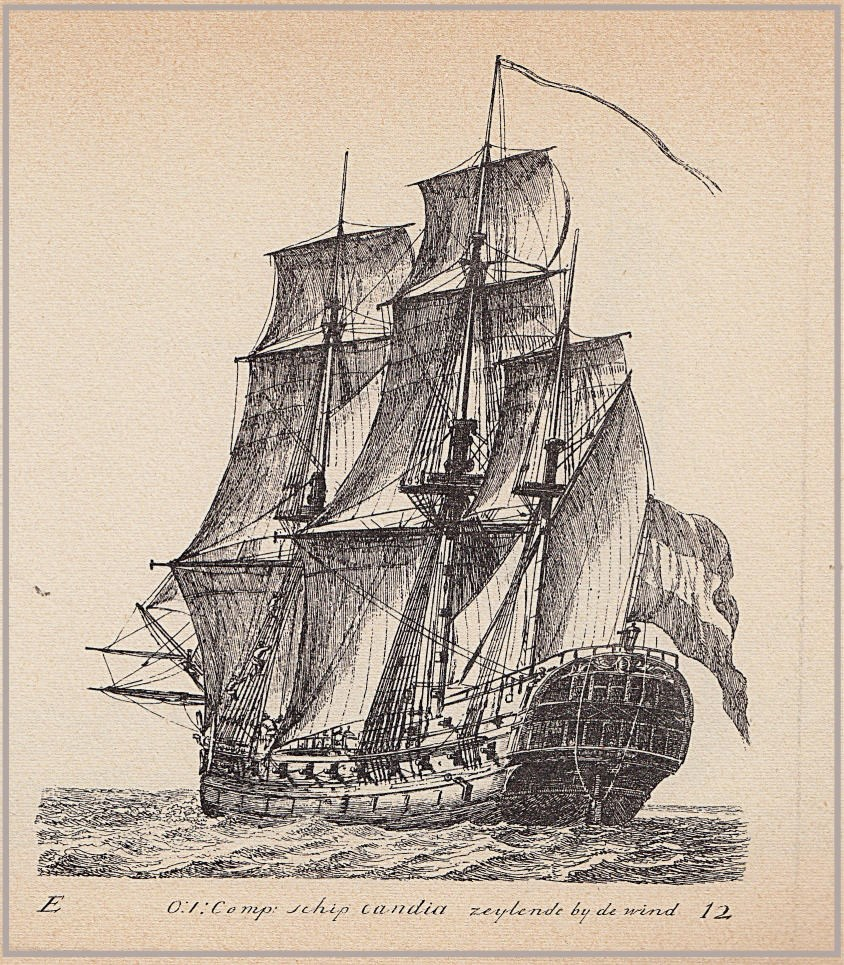
- VOC ship Candia, engraving by G. Groenewegen 1789

History

Dutch Republic
- Name: Candia
- Owner: Dutch East India Company
- Builder: Rotterdam Dockyard
- Launched: 1788
- Maiden voyage: 26 October 1790
- Out of service: 1796
- Fate: Dismantled, 1796

General characteristics
- Type: Spiegelretourschip
- Tons burthen: 1150 tons
- Length: 45.73 m (150 ft 0 in)
- Sail plan: Full-rigged ship

Candia was a ship of the Dutch East India Company (Dutch: Vereenigde Oost-Indische Compagnie; VOC) which only once traveled for Asia in 1790 and never returned to the Netherlands.

== Construction ==
Candia was an East Indiaman ship built for the Chamber of Rotterdam of the Dutch East India Company in 1788 in the Rotterdam shipyards, as a 1150-ton ship with a length of 45.73 metres (150.0 ft).

== History ==
On 26 October 1790 the Candia left Europe from the island of Goeree for its travel to Batavia under the command of captain Dirk Dirksz Varkevisser (1758-1805), who previously had command over the VOC ship Middelwijk in 1786 and 1787. The ship left with 186 people on board. It arrived for a stop at Cape Town on 13 February 1791, disembarking 20 persons. On the passage to Cape Town 3 persons had perished. Departing on 23 March 1791, it finally arrived in Batavia on 15 June 1791, where it was sold in 1796 and broken up.

== Visible remainder ==
The Dutch maritime painter Gerrit Groenewegen (1754-1826) created a depiction of the Candia in 1789, while still in Dutch waters near Rotterdam, giving a good impression of the appearance of the Dutch Spiegelretourschip in those days.

== Citations ==
- Bruijn, Jaap R. (2011). Commanders of Dutch East India ships in the eighteenth century. Boydell Prress. ISBN 978-1-84383-622-3. OCLC 768529539.
