= Balkania (brand) =

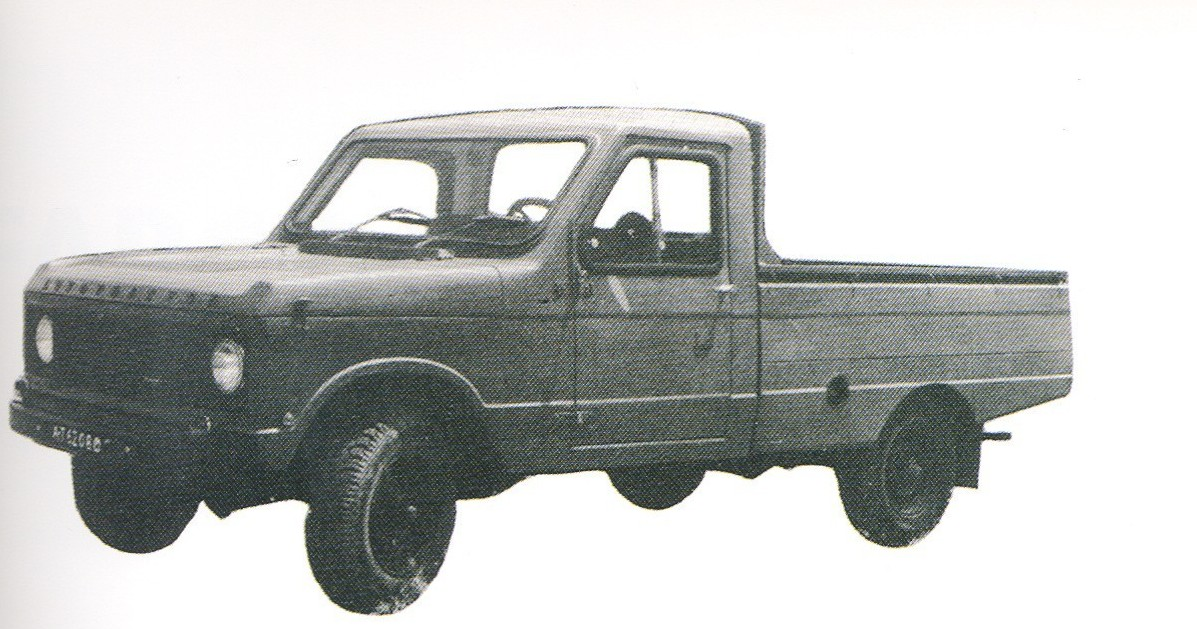
Balkania Autotractor 4x4 truck (Balkania-own development)

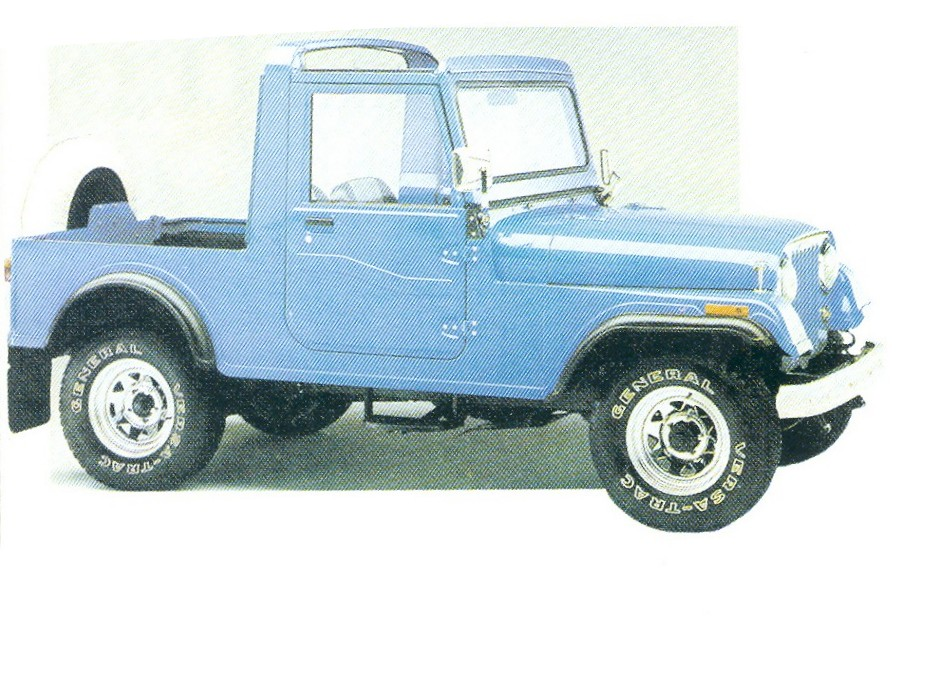
Balkania Autotractor KZ (based on Mahindra model)

Balkania was the trade name of 'K. Zacharopoulos A.B.E.E.' a Greek industrial and trading company based in Athens that produced 4x4 jeep-type vehicles and 4x4 trucks. Since 1945, K. Zacharopoulos had been involved in vehicle repair and rebuilding. The Balkania company was founded in 1954 and since 1972 it imported Romanian and Indian vehicles. In 1975 it designed and introduced its own Autotractor model, a 4x4 multi-purpose truck with a Mercedes-Benz 3200 cc Diesel engine, metal cabin and a payload of 1,500 kg (3,307 lb). In 1979 the model was redesigned, with a modern synthetic (glass-fiber reinforced composite) cabin. It was produced, as some similar Greek vehicles, until a change of a favorable categorization for agricultural vehicles in 1984 limited its prospects (see also AutoDiana, Petropoulos). The vehicle was modestly successful, as it exhibited certain quality problems.

In 1975 Balkania also introduced a lighter Autotractor series of Jeep-type 4x4 vehicles. These were not of own design, but were actually modified Indian Mahindra models (in turn based on older U.S. Jeep models), using a Peugeot 2100 cc 62 hp (46 kW) Diesel engine. The more modern-looking Autotractor KZ (from the founder's name initials) was available with the aforementioned engine, as well as a Peugeot 2500 cc 103 hp (77 kW) gasoline engine. In 1984 the company was partially acquired by Mahindra & Mahindra, the factory was modernized and its name was changed to Mahindra Hellas A.E.. The model name Autotractor was dropped and all vehicles produced were Mahindra models sold with that name, although in somewhat modified versions. Most of this production was exported. The company went out of business in 1995.
