= William Dumas =

French politician

William Dumas (born 23 January 1942 in Nîmes) was a member of the National Assembly of France from 2004 to 2017. He represented the 5th constituency of the Gard department, and is a member of the Socialiste, radical, citoyen et divers gauche.
