= Dimadis-Kanakis =

Greek engine manufacturer

Dimadis-Kanakis (since 1986 Kanakis E.P.E.) is a historic Greek engine and metal products manufacturer, based in Volos. It was founded in 1920 by Pavlos Dimadis and Ioannis Kanakis, initially focusing on engine repair and rebuilding. In 1926 the company developed and produced its first semi-diesel engines (10-60 hp, mostly for boat power). Soon an extended range of engine models, up to 120 hp, was developed and the company became one of the best known Greek engine makers, mostly remembered for the reliability of its products. Some exports were also made.

Since 1952 focus shifted to metal products and in 1986 Dimadis-Kanakis was reorganized as Kanakis E.P.E. As of 2010 the company, one of the few historic mechanical engineering companies of Volos that had survived the crisis of the 1970s and 1980s, faced severe financial problems.
