= Agrocar (trucks) =

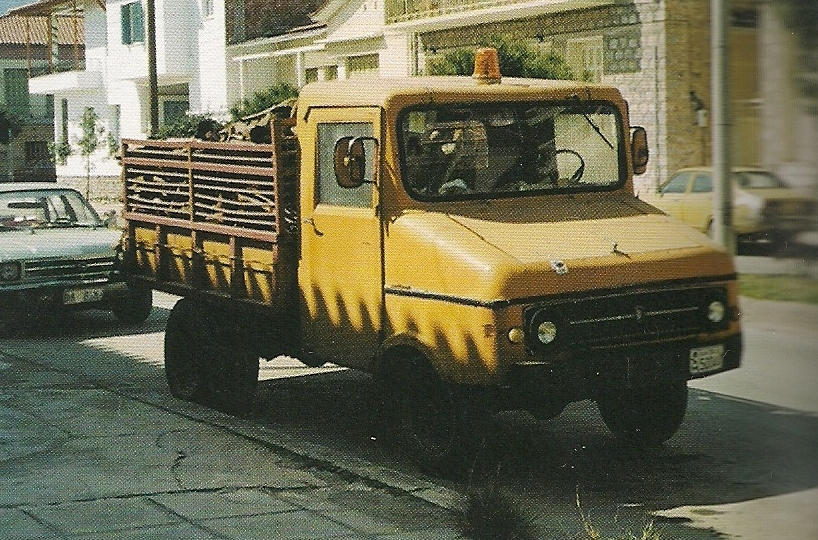
Agrocar truck (1973 model)

Agrocar (ΑΓΡΟΚΑΡ) was the brand name used by Athens-based G. Makris – E. Ladopoulos O.E., a small company producing agricultural equipment; trucks, mostly used by farmers around Greece, were also produced for a few years. The trucks, classified in Greece as “agricultural machinery”, were introduced in the early 1970s, and used Mercedes-Benz engines and certain mechanical parts by Jeep.

== References/External links ==
- L.S. Skartsis and G.A. Avramidis, "Made in Greece", Typorama, Patras, Greece (2003) ISBN 960-7620-30-5 (republished by the University of Patras Science Park, 2007)
- L.S. Skartsis, "Modern Greece's Machines: A Comprehensive Guide to Greek Vehicle & Machine Manufacturers (1700 to Present)" (2026) ISBN 978-618-00-6734-7 (open access eBook)
- Agrocar Trucks in Dutch Auto Catalog
