= Villevieille =

- Commune
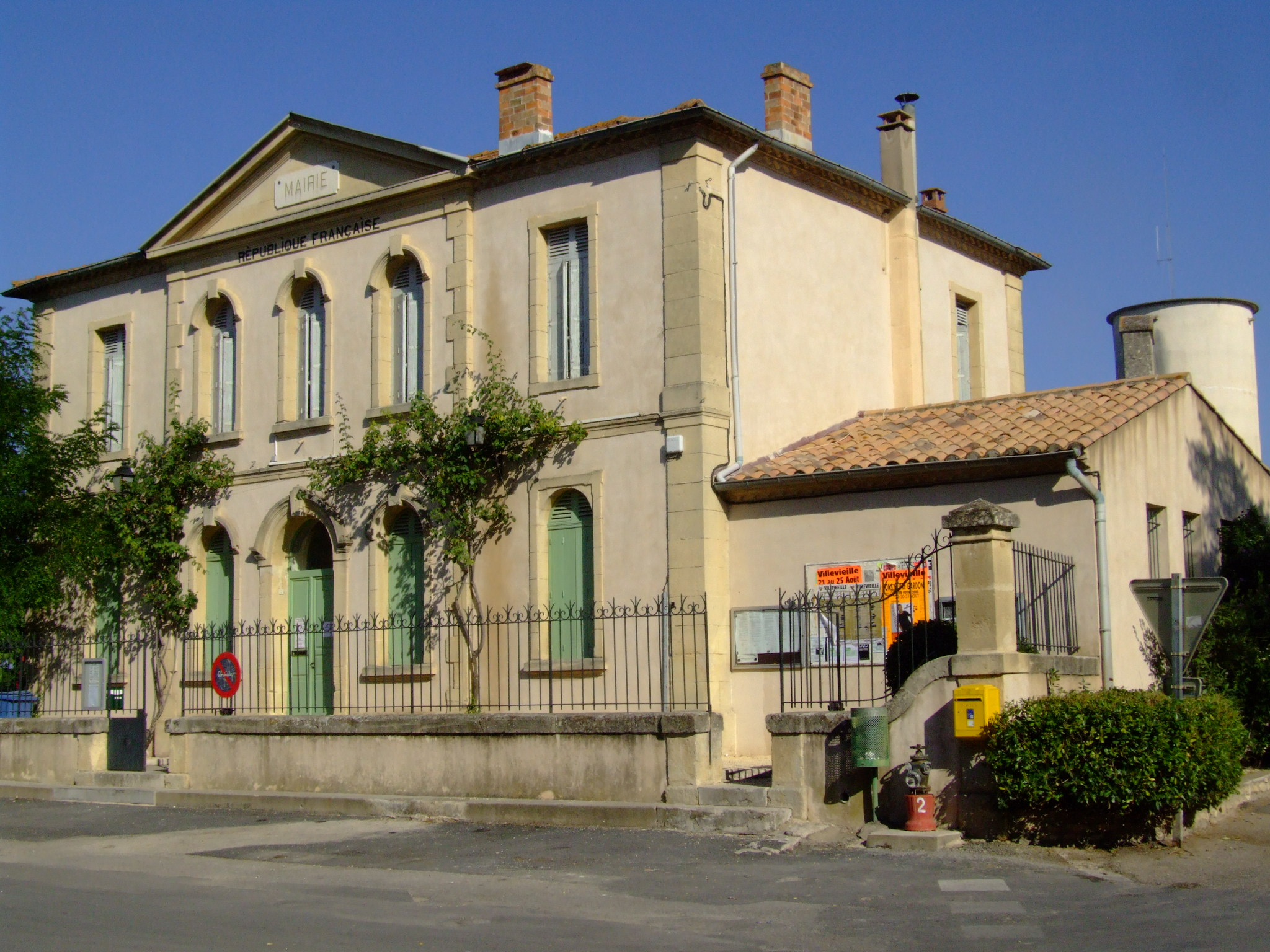
- The town hall in Villevieille

- Coat of arms
- Location of Villevieille
- Location within France Location within Occitanie
- Coordinates: 43°47′22″N 4°05′50″E
- Country: France
- Region: Occitania
- Department: Gard
- Arrondissement: Nîmes
- Canton: Calvisson
- Intercommunality: Pays de Sommières

Government
  - Mayor (2020–2026): Cécile Marquier
- Area^{1}: 8.28 km^{2} (3.20 sq mi)
- Elevation: 61 m (200 ft)
- Highest elevation: 106 m (348 ft)
- Lowest elevation: 23 m (75 ft)
- Population (2023): 1,889
  - Density: 228/km^{2} (591/sq mi)
- Time zone: UTC+01:00 (CET)
  - Summer (DST): UTC+02:00 (CEST)
- INSEE/Postal code: 30352 /30250
- ^{1} French Land Register data, which excludes lakes, ponds, glaciers > 1 km^{2} (0.386 sq mi or 247 acres) and river estuaries.

Villevieille (French pronunciation: [vil.vjɛj]; Occitan: Vilavièlha) is a commune in the Gard department in southern France.

== Geography ==
The village is located on the banks of the Vidourle.

=== Climate ===
The climate is hot-summer Mediterranean (Köppen: Csa). On 28 June 2019, during the June 2019 European heat wave, the temperature reached 45.4 °C (113.7 °F) in Villevieille, briefly the highest in French meteorological history, before being surpassed by Gallargues-le-Montueux later the same day.

Climate data for Villevieille (1991−2020 normals, extremes 1970−present)
Month	Jan	Feb	Mar	Apr	May	Jun	Jul	Aug	Sep	Oct	Nov	Dec	Year
Record high °C (°F)	22.4 (72.3)	24.5 (76.1)	28.7 (83.7)	31.4 (88.5)	35.5 (95.9)	45.4 (113.7)	41.6 (106.9)	40.9 (105.6)	36.0 (96.8)	33.1 (91.6)	26.3 (79.3)	22.1 (71.8)	45.4 (113.7)
Mean daily maximum °C (°F)	11.9 (53.4)	13.3 (55.9)	16.9 (62.4)	19.5 (67.1)	23.7 (74.7)	28.4 (83.1)	31.5 (88.7)	31.2 (88.2)	26.3 (79.3)	21.0 (69.8)	15.6 (60.1)	12.3 (54.1)	21.0 (69.8)
Daily mean °C (°F)	6.8 (44.2)	7.5 (45.5)	10.7 (51.3)	13.4 (56.1)	17.2 (63.0)	21.3 (70.3)	24.1 (75.4)	23.9 (75.0)	19.6 (67.3)	15.6 (60.1)	10.6 (51.1)	7.4 (45.3)	14.8 (58.6)
Mean daily minimum °C (°F)	1.8 (35.2)	1.7 (35.1)	4.4 (39.9)	7.2 (45.0)	10.8 (51.4)	14.3 (57.7)	16.6 (61.9)	16.5 (61.7)	12.9 (55.2)	10.2 (50.4)	5.6 (42.1)	2.5 (36.5)	8.7 (47.7)
Record low °C (°F)	−13.9 (7.0)	−10.1 (13.8)	−10.7 (12.7)	−2.7 (27.1)	0.9 (33.6)	5.1 (41.2)	7.5 (45.5)	5.5 (41.9)	2.2 (36.0)	−2.2 (28.0)	−7.9 (17.8)	−9.7 (14.5)	−13.9 (7.0)
Average precipitation mm (inches)	62.2 (2.45)	42.5 (1.67)	47.0 (1.85)	71.2 (2.80)	53.1 (2.09)	39.3 (1.55)	21.6 (0.85)	48.8 (1.92)	107.6 (4.24)	103.7 (4.08)	97.8 (3.85)	66.3 (2.61)	761.1 (29.96)
Average precipitation days (≥ 1.0 mm)	6.0	4.6	4.8	6.5	6.0	4.6	3.1	4.3	5.1	6.7	7.6	5.9	65.4
Source: Météo-France

== Demography ==
Historical population
Year	Pop.	±% p.a.
1968	507	—
1975	650	+3.61%
1982	936	+5.35%
1990	1,030	+1.20%
1999	1,196	+1.67%
2007	1,582	+3.56%
2012	1,638	+0.70%
2017	1,709	+0.85%
2023	1,889	+1.68%
Source: INSEE

== See also ==
- Communes of the Gard department
