= Thorens-Glières =

Thorens-Glières Torin (Savoyard)
- Part of Fillière
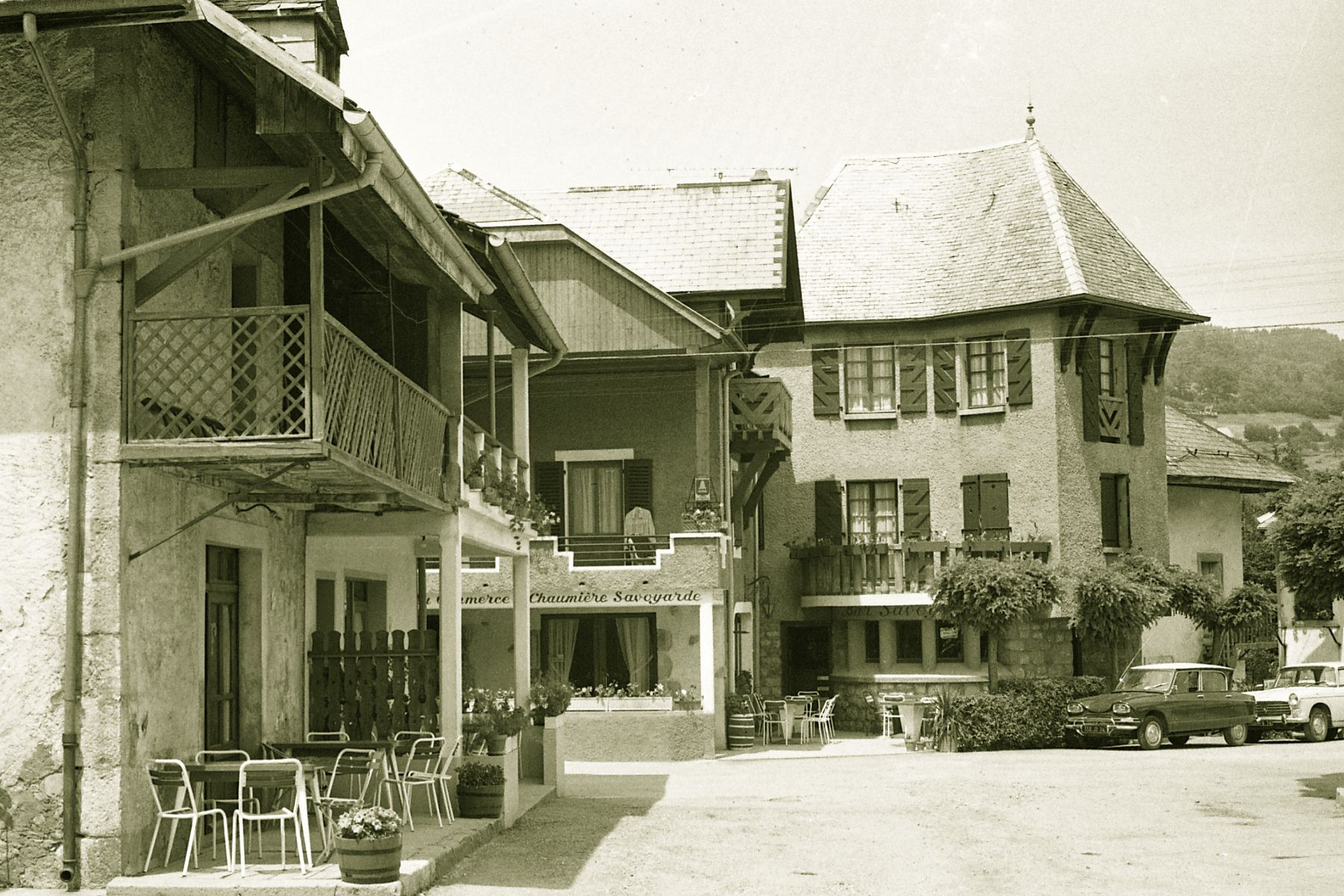
- The village in 1969
- Location of Thorens-Glières
- Location within France Location within Auvergne-Rhône-Alpes
- Coordinates: 45°59′52″N 6°14′52″E
- Country: France
- Region: Auvergne-Rhône-Alpes
- Department: Haute-Savoie
- Arrondissement: Annecy
- Canton: Annecy-le-Vieux
- Commune: Fillière
- Area^{1}: 63.05 km^{2} (24.34 sq mi)
- Highest elevation: 2,004 m (6,575 ft)
- Lowest elevation: 565 m (1,854 ft)
- Population (2022): 3,315
  - Density: 52.58/km^{2} (136.2/sq mi)
- Time zone: UTC+01:00 (CET)
  - Summer (DST): UTC+02:00 (CEST)
- Postal code: 74570
- ^{1} French Land Register data, which excludes lakes, ponds, glaciers > 1 km^{2} (0.386 sq mi or 247 acres) and river estuaries.

Thorens-Glières (French pronunciation: [tɔʁɑ̃ ɡlijɛʁ]; Savoyard: Torin) is a former commune in the Haute-Savoie department in the Auvergne-Rhône-Alpes region in south-eastern France. On 1 January 2017, it was merged into the new commune Fillière. It is the birthplace of St. Francis de Sales.

== Notable people ==
- Nedd Willard

== See also ==
- Communes of the Haute-Savoie department
