= MotorCar (trucks) =

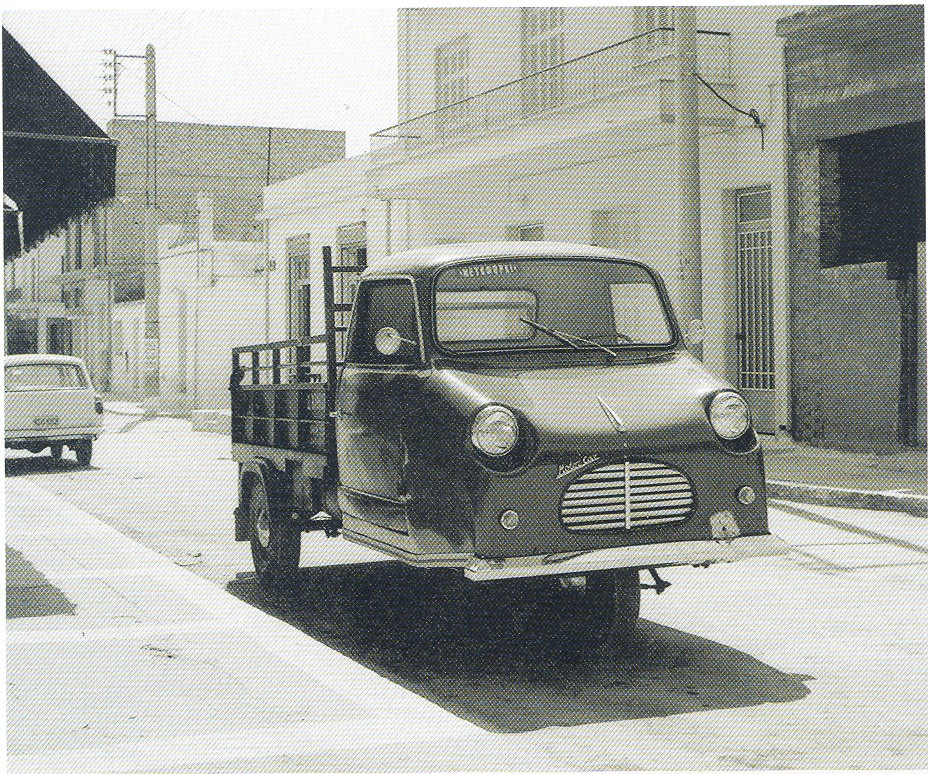
MotorCar truck, featuring typical Greek cab design of the late 1960s

MotorCar was a Greek three-wheeler truck manufacturer, in business between 1967 and 1971. It was one of the smaller in its category, although rather "professional" in its quality of design and construction. Its models (all tipper) used a chassis developed by MotorCar, in two versions using Volkswagen and German Ford engines, respectively. According to their classification, both models could legally carry only 350 kg, although in practice they were loaded with up to 2 tonnes by their users.
