= Michel Sala =

French politician

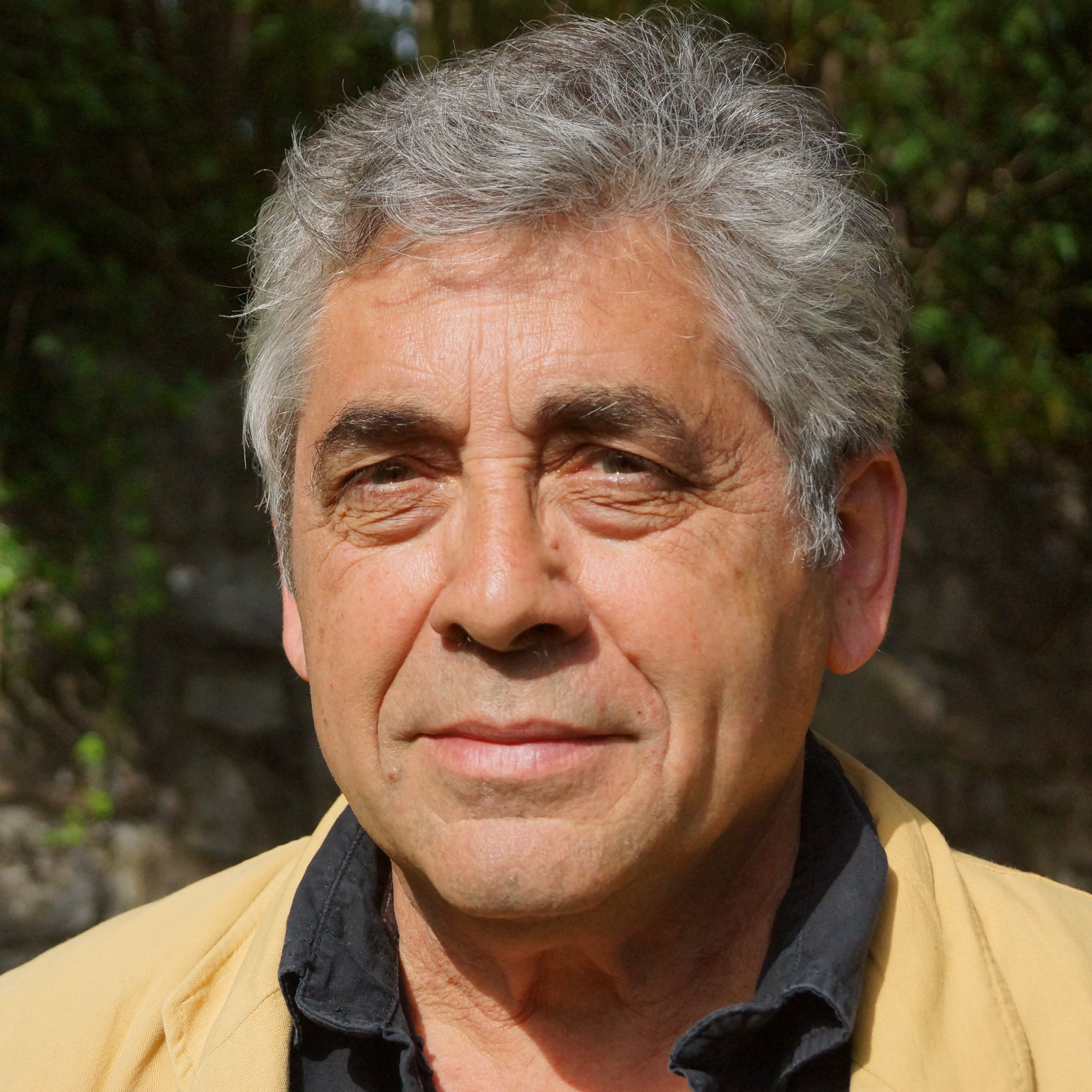
- Sala in 2022

Member of the National Assembly for Gard's 5th constituency
- In office 22 June 2022 – 9 June 2024
- Preceded by: Catherine Daufès-Roux
- Succeeded by: Alexandre Allegret-Pilot

Personal details
- Born: 13 May 1954 (age 71) Oran, French Algeria
- Party: La France Insoumise (2016–present)
- Other political affiliations: Revolutionary Communist League (1974–2009); New Anticapitalist Party (2009–2013); Ensemble! (2013–2023); Ecosocialist Left (2022–present)

Michel Sala (born 13 May 1954) is an Algerian-born French trade unionist and politician of La France Insoumise who has been representing Gard's 5th constituency in the National Assembly since 2022.

== See also ==
- List of deputies of the 16th National Assembly of France
