= Malkotsis =

Greek tractor manufacturer

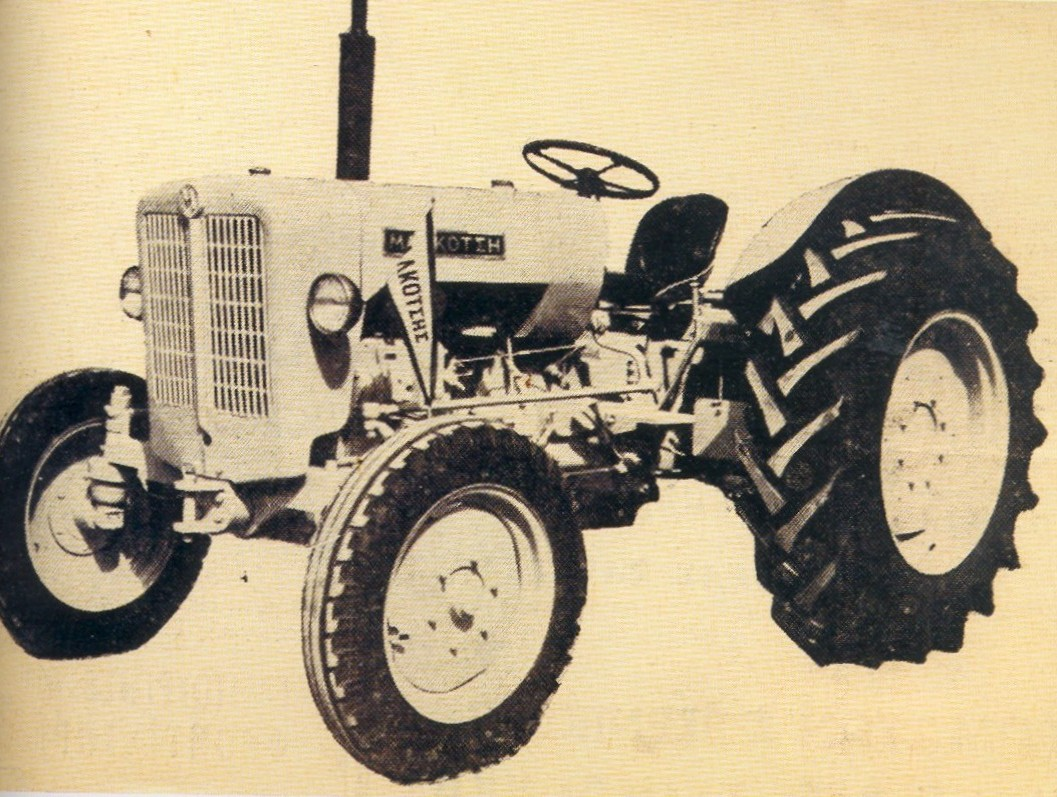
Malkotsis EM-4 tractor (1962 version of original 1959 model)

Malkotsis was the trade name for Technica S. Malkotsis A.E., which has historically been the most important Greek engine manufacturer, surpassing several engine (mostly diesel and semi-diesel) manufacturers that flourished in Greece in the 1920s and (mostly) 1930s, like Dimadis-Kanakis in Volos, Peteinaris in Kalamata, Sideris, BIO, and others in Athens, etc. Located in Piraeus, before World War II Malkotsis produced various types of industrial machinery. After the war it produced industrial machinery for several Greek companies, but it progressively focused almost entirely on diesel engines, soon becoming the largest company in its field. Malkotsis engines found use in a variety of industrial applications, while its boat engine models became legendary for their reliability. A series of electric motors was produced as well. Its EM Diesel series (designed in collaboration with a British consulting firm) included engines specifically designed for powering of vehicles and was employed in Malkotsis's own farm tractor models (Malkotsis EM-2 and EM-4) introduced in 1959. The tractors were produced for only a few years, due to lack of funding and other problems related to a complete lack of state support. The company faced financial problems later, due to competition from cheaper imports, and was acquired in 1991 by Drakos-Polemis A.E., a pump manufacturing company which used all Malkotsis infrastructure for its production purposes.

== See also ==
- List of former tractor manufacturers
- List of tractor manufacturers
