= Prince-bishop of Geneva =

Prince-Bishop of Geneva of Bishopric of Geneva
- Flag of Geneva (15th century), showing both the imperial eagle and a key of St. Peter, reflecting its dual status as free city and Prince-Bishopric
- Residence: St. Pierre Cathedral, Geneva
- Appointer: Archbishop of Vienne (spiritual); Holy Roman Emperor / cathedral chapter (temporal)
- Formation: 1154 (raised to prince-bishopric)
- First holder: Saint Isaac (c. 400, as bishop; princely status from 1154)
- Final holder: Pierre de La Baume (1522–1536)
- Abolished: 1536 (Genevan Reformation)

The Prince-Bishop of Geneva was the ecclesiastical and secular ruler of Geneva from the early Middle Ages until the Reformation. As a suffragan of the Archbishopric of Vienne, the bishop held spiritual authority, but from 1154 he also enjoyed the status of prince of the Holy Roman Empire, exercising temporal power in and around the city of Geneva. The prince-bishops often struggled to maintain their independence against the Counts of Geneva and later the House of Savoy, who sought to dominate the see by appointing relatives to the episcopal office.

By the late fifteenth century, the city’s communal institutions had largely curtailed episcopal authority, paving the way for Geneva’s eventual transformation into a free imperial city and a center of the Protestant Reformation. The original Diocese of Geneva keeps its name in the Diocese of Lausanne, Geneva and Fribourg.

== Early Appointment ==
From the beginning, the bishopric of Geneva operated as a suffragan of the Archbishopric of Vienne. On 17 January 1154, the Emperor Frederick Barbarossa received Bishop Ardicius at his court at Speyer, and appointed and invested him as a Prince of the Holy Roman Empire. But they had to maintain a long struggle for their independence against the guardians (advocati) of the archbishop, the counts of Geneva and later the counts of the House of Savoy.

At some time around 1219 that the Counts of Geneva completely quit the city and moved their capital to Annecy.

Bishop Guillaume de Conflans and Count Amadeus V of Savoy were in continual conflict on many matters during the entire period of the bishop's administration, 1287 to 1295. On 30 December 1287, the bishop laid an interdict on all the lands of the count in his diocese. On 19 September 1290, they signed a treaty, by which the Counts of Savoy obtained the right to appoint the bishop's lieutenant, or Vidame, as a fief, and the diocese had returned rights and properties along the Rhone which had been appropriated by the Count. This was granted to the counts of the House of Candia under count François de Candie of Chambéry-Le-Vieux a Chatellaine of the Savoy, this official exercised minor jurisdiction in the town in the bishop's absence.

== Rise of Genevan Self Government ==
In 1387, Bishop Adhémar Fabry granted the town its great charter, the basis of its communal self-government, which every bishop on his accession was expected to confirm. The line of the counts of Geneva ended in 1394, and the House of Savoy came into possession of their territory, assuming after 1416 the title of Duke. The new dynasty sought to bring the city of Geneva under their power, particularly by elevating members of their own family to the episcopal see. In 1447 Antipope Felix V, who was also Duke of Savoy, appointed himself as bishop of Geneva, and the Savoy dynasty ruled the episcopal see until 1490, when popular pressure compelled the dynasty to renounce the title of bishop.

In 1394, the Counts of Geneva's line went extinct with the House of Savoy seeking to take its place. On 19 February 1416, King Sigismund of Germany granted the counts of Savoy the title "Duke". The counts repeatedly maneuvered to elevate their family members to the Bishop of Geneva's diocesan staff. Their most notable success came when the former Duke Amadeus VIII, who had been elected Pope Felix V by the Council of Basel, became Administrator of the diocese of Geneva in March 1444, and held the office until his death in 1451.

In 1457 the Grand Council was established in Geneva elected by the citizens of Geneva and after 1490 elected the bishops of Geneva, after the House of Savoy had renounced that right. This same council gradually became estranged from the Duke of Savoy.

=== The Protestant Reformation ===
The City of Geneva responded to the successes of the House of Savoy by making an alliance with the Old Swiss Confederacy, an Eidgenossenschaft. In 1526, Geneva aligned with Bern and Fribourg.

On 2 August 1527, Bishop Pierre de la Baume, harassed both by the people of Geneva and by the Duke of Savoy, fled the city for some property in Burgundy.

During the Reformation, the City of Bern supported the Protestant Reformers at the time led by William Farel. The City of Fribourg remained loyal to the Catholic Church and in 1531, renounced its alliance with Geneva.

On 2 July 1533, he returned to Geneva, but on 14 July he fled again. He and the cathedral Chapter of Geneva established his see in Annecy in 1535, and, despite encouragement from Pope Clement VII, they were unable to persuade the Genevans to allow a return. The Emperor Charles V issued a golden bull suspending all authority in Geneva except that of the emperor and the bishop. The Church imposed an interdict.

In 1536, John Calvin went to Geneva making the city a stronghold of Reformed Christianity.
