= Record (agricultural vehicles) =

Defunct Greek vehicle manufacturer

Record GS 2000 truck (1980)

Record GS 2000 truck (back view)

Record A.E.B.E. (brand also spelled in Greek as Ρεκόρ) was the name of a Greek company producing agricultural machinery and vehicles, founded in Heraklion, Crete in 1957 and dissolved in 1999. Its products included walking tractors (introduced in 1958), a family of characteristic Greek three-wheel vehicles that combined truck and tractor functions (introduced in 1966), "proper" tractors (introduced in 1970), and four-wheel trucks (introduced in 1978); mechanical equipment such as clutches and gearboxes for use in its vehicles were also produced. The main market was Greece, although some of its walking tractors were exported. Annual vehicle production in the late 1970s and early 1980s averaged 500 units.

The most advanced models were the 1970 ΓΣ 7 tractor, which used 18-26 hp Ruggerini Diesel engines, and the 1980 GS 2000 truck, which used a 1,400 cc, 55 hp Peugeot Diesel engine. This fibreglass-bodied truck could carry two tonnes and featured a cab design clearly influenced by those of contemporary Japanese models, in particular the first generation Mitsubishi Delica.
