= House of Candia =

Noble family in Savoy, France

STEMMA CANDIÆArms of Candia from the Savoyard Heraldry Registry, Château de Candie, Chambéry-Le-Vieux, France

The House of Candia was a noble family from Savoy (14th–16th). It held a castle at Chambéry-Le-Vieux under the name "Château de Candie".

== Members ==
François de Candie was Viscount of Geneva (Latin:Vice Dominus Genevarum) and Captain of the castle on the island of the Rhône in 1377.

== Sources ==
- Comte Amédée de Foras, Armorial et nobiliaire de l'ancien duché de Savoie, vol. 1, Grenoble, Allier Frères, 1863-1966 (archive), pp. 299 à 301, « Candie (de) »
- Annuaire de la noblesse de France (1861), on line
- Chateau de Candie
