= Diana (agricultural machinery) =

Brand of Greek agricultural machinery

Diana V3 12 hp light tractor with truck bed

Diana (Διάνα) is the brand name for agricultural machinery produced by Irene Chrissadakou A.E. a company located in Tavros (Athens), Greece. Founded in 1976, it is one of the most successful light tractor manufacturers in Greece, also managing to survive the crisis in Greek manufacturing industry of the 1980s and 1990s.

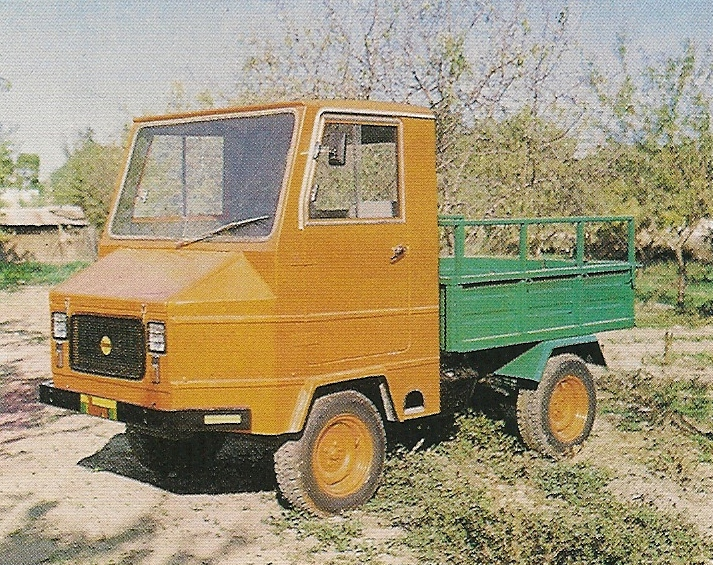
Diana light truck with cross-country capability (1979)

Diana has produced a wide range of machinery and accessories. Between 1979 and 1984 it developed and produced a type of light truck in "open" and "closed" cab versions, 18 hp Ruggerini Diesel engine (license produced by Mekmotors Hellas), max speed 67 km/h, 1 ton payload and cross-country capability, as well as a number of light tractor models.
