= Agricola (vehicles) =

Greek auto company

- Industry: Automotive
- Headquarters: Thessaloniki, Greece
- Products: 4x4 multi-purpose vehicles and farm marchinery

Agricola (G. Tsolakidis & Co. O.E.) was a Greek maker of 4x4 multi-purpose trucks and other farm machinery based in Thessaloniki. The Agricola 25 GT 4x4 truck was a fairly advanced design introduced in 1975, with enhanced all-terrain capabilities, a metal cab and Mercedes-Benz 180D Diesel engine. It was a typical Greek multi-purpose truck with a payload of 1,650 kg (3,638 lb) and a maximum speed 80 km/h (50 mph). The cab was designed by Georgios Michael, designer of other Greek vehicles including the Neorion Chicago and the MAVA-Renault Farma. The vehicle was produced until 1984.

== Sources ==
- L.S. Skartsis and G.A. Avramidis, 'Made in Greece', Typorama, Patras, Greece (2003).
- G.N. Georgano (Ed.), 'The Complete Encyclopedia of Commercial Vehicles', Krause Publication, Iola, Wisconsin (1979).
