= Petropoulos =

Greek vehicle and heavy machinery distributor

petropoulos logo

Petropoulos Π-55 tractor (1960)

Petropoulos (the full name of the company is Petros Petropoulos A.E.B.E.) is today a major importer and distributor of vehicles and heavy machinery, having been, at the same time, one of the historic Greek tractor, vehicle and engine manufacturers.

== History ==
Petropoulos Π-35 tractor (1956)

=== Early steps ===
The Petropoulos family has been involved in metal constructions for generations. Konstantinos Petropoulos was a well known manufacturer of church bells and metal products in the late 19th century, based in Amfissa and, later, in Lamia. According to tradition, there was a supposed well-kept "secret" behind the sound quality of the Petropoulos bells – the bell being today the recognizable company logo.

The company in its present form was founded by Petros Petropoulos in Thessaloniki in 1922. Early activities included sales of commercial vehicles as well as rebuilding of engines and vehicle assembly. This early construction activity involved assembly of Ford (1920s) and Willys-Overland (1930s) passenger cars, and Diamond T and International trucks (1930s). The Petropoulos factory was put under German control during the Axis occupation of Greece in World War II. The company resumed business after the war, and in 1948 it moved its headquarters to Athens, where it already had created a subsidiary.

Petropoulos-assembled Willys (1936)

=== Post-WWII Development ===
Petropoulos Unitrak 4x4 (1976 model)

Rebuilding of engines remained a major activity until 1953, when Petropoulos greatly expanded the popularity of the diesel engine in Greece, thanks to its cooperation with British F. Perkins Limited. In 1956 Petropoulos made a bold move, investing in farm tractor production. Model Π-35 introduced in 1956, as well as the more powerful Π-55 that followed shortly, were based on International Harvester designs (powered, though, by Perkins engines). Competitively priced and robust, these tractors became immediate success stories; however, in the early 1960s the company was engaged in a legal dispute over market (competition) rules with Malkotsis, another Greek tractor manufacturer claiming a share in the fast developing tractor market, resulting in production delays that almost bankrupted the company.

Petropoulos Dynalift forklift truck (part of a 1990 advertisement). In this year, Dynalift was the best-selling forklift truck in Greece.

The company eventually abandoned production of its own tractor series and focused on engine production and truck and tractor assembly (Petropoulos-assembled trucks and tractors were exported to Europe and the Middle East). In 1974 it engaged into its boldest project, development and production of a new "smart" 4X4 truck family (Unitrak/Polytrak/Militrak models). The trucks sold fairly well to farmers, but the Greek Army ordered only small numbers of the Militrak version. This, and a 1984 change of a law that had made "farm vehicles" economically attractive, lead to termination of production. Once more the company, after heavily investing in an industrial project, was found in a dire financial state.

=== Decline of the Industrial Division and New Ventures ===
Petropoulos has developed a variety of other industrial products, including power generators and forklift trucks (most notably the successful Dynalift family of Diesel- and Electric-powered forklifts). It even made an effort in 1994 to resume truck production, introducing a Swiss (Bucher) – designed vehicle as the Militrak II Duro; however again, the vehicle was not adopted by the Greek Army.

Since the late 1990s Petropoulos has decisively shifted to imports, trading and services retaining only a limited industrial activity. The company maintains a small museum within its facilities, with exhibits including a restored Π-35 tractor and a fully restored Polytrak truck.

Ecoshift (Petropoulos Group) NOOS electric scooter (2024)

In 2024, the production of a series of energy storage systems and electric scooters in a new factory in Athens was announced by Ecoshift, a company created by the Petropoulos Group.
