= Canton of Annecy-3 =

Coordinates: 45.91°N 6.15°E

The canton of Annecy-3 (before March 2020: canton of Annecy-le-Vieux) is an administrative division of the Haute-Savoie department, southeastern France. Its borders were modified at the French canton reorganisation which came into effect in March 2015. Its seat is in Annecy.

It consists of the following communes:

1. Annecy (partly)
2. Argonay
3. Charvonnex
4. Épagny Metz-Tessy
5. Fillière
6. Groisy
7. Nâves-Parmelan
8. Villaz
