= Air data boom =

Externally mounted aircraft sensors for measuring outside air

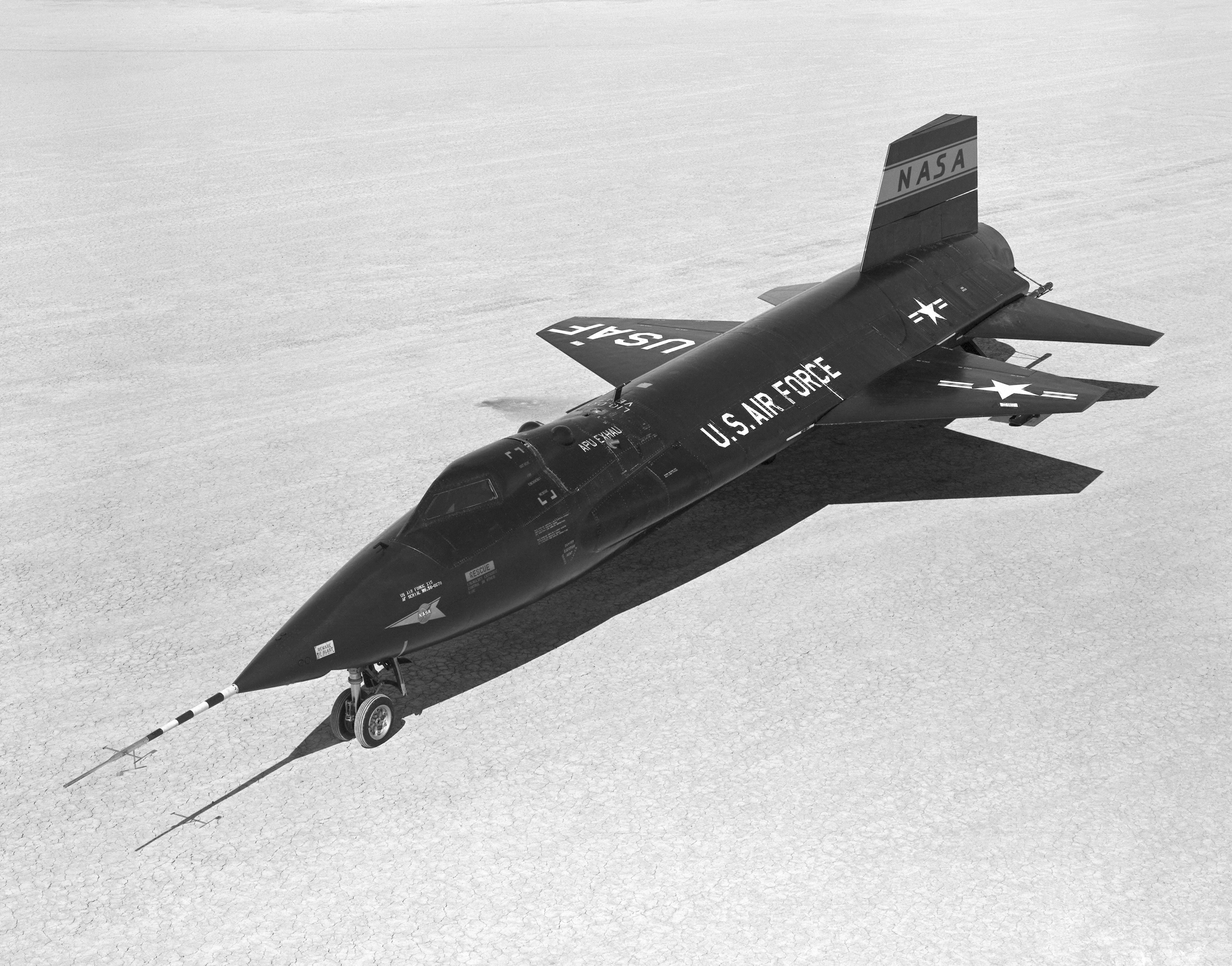
X-15 rocket-powered research aircraft, with nose air data boom

An air data boom provides air pressure, temperature, and airflow direction data to data acquisition systems for the computation of air, ground, and water vehicle orientation, speed, altitude/depth, and related information. Air data booms can be used as primary sensors or as a "measurement standard" of which primary sensors and instruments are compared to.

== Purpose and overview ==
An air data boom is used to collect source data during the testing of air vehicles, ground vehicles, and water-borne vessels. The air data boom is mounted on the vehicle in a location that allows for relatively undisturbed air to be measured. To attain such undisturbed air, mounting is usually done on the nose, wing, or upper horizontal stabilizer of the vehicle.

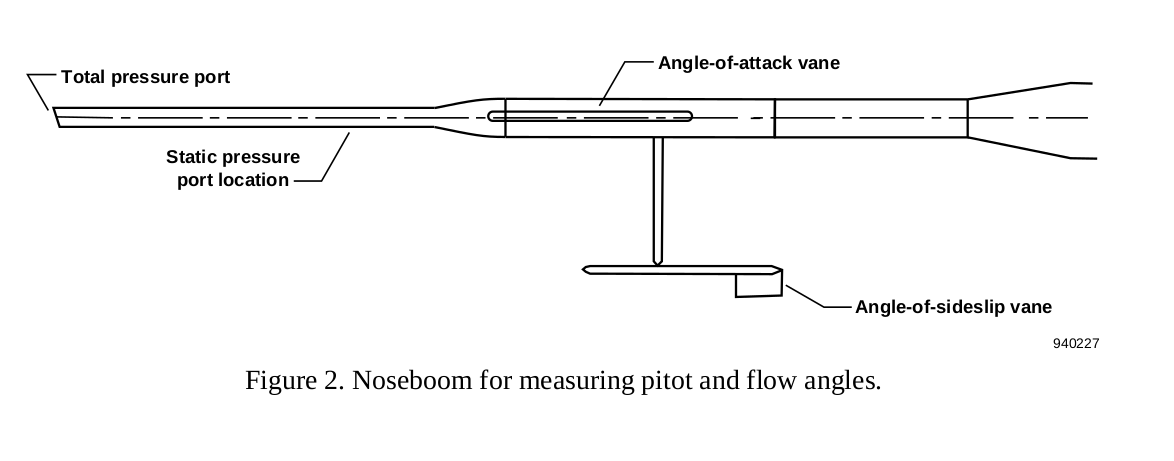
Diagram of 100600-style air data boom.

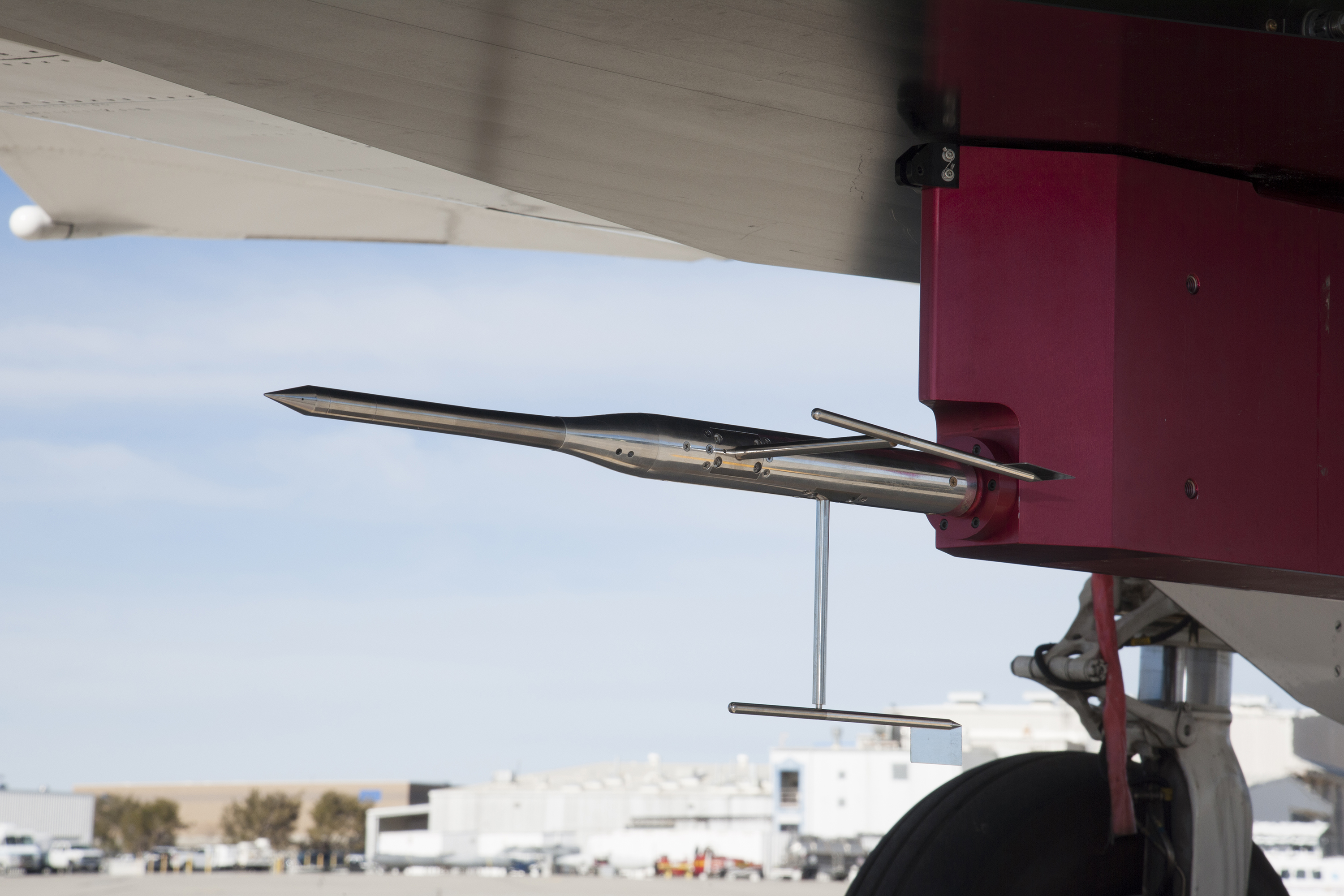
High-speed air data boom mounted on F-15 derivative aircraft.

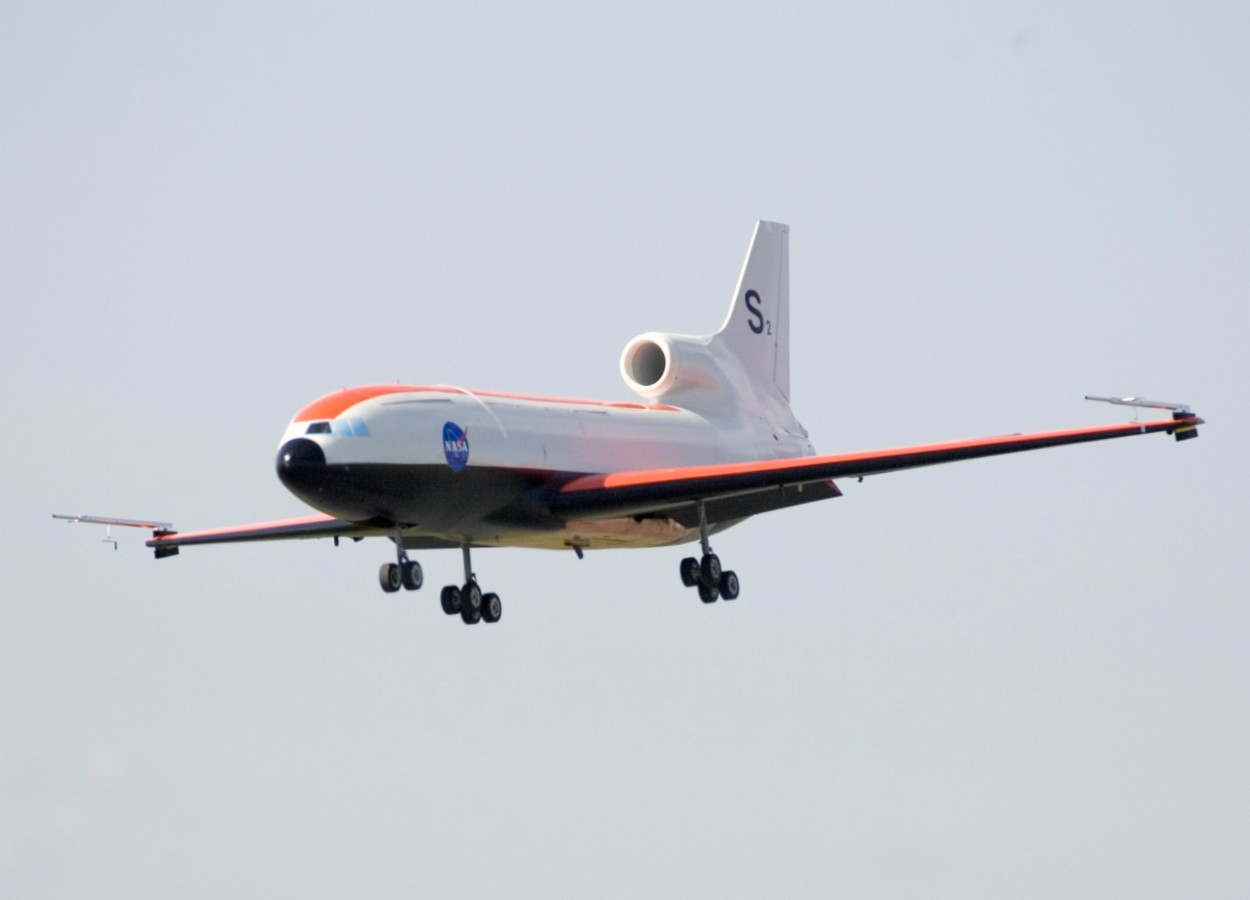
Two wing-mounted subminiature air data booms on NASA S2 1/24-scale L-1011 model aircraft.

== Typical components ==
Air data booms may measure one, some, or all of these capabilities:

- angle of attack (AoA, alpha)
- angle of sideslip (AoS, beta)
- static pressure (Ps)
- total pressure (Pt, pitot pressure)
- outside air temperature (OAT)
- total air temperature (TAT)

Specialized air data booms may also contain mission-specific sensors such as humidity sensors, ice detectors, accelerometers, strain gages, and the like.

== Synonyms ==
An air data boom may be referred to by a variety of names, including:

- flight test boom
- vehicle test boom
- nose boom
- wing boom
- YAPS head (for Yaw, Angle of Attack, Pitot, Static head)

== Manufacturers ==
Most air data booms are either procured from niche manufacturers such as SpaceAge Control, Goodrich, (Note: Since 2012, part of UTC Aerospace Systems) or created by vehicle manufacturers, R&D facilities, and test organizations.

== See also ==
- Angle of attack
- Flight test
- Flight test instrumentation
- Index of aviation articles
- Pitot-static system
- Pitot tube
- Synthetic air data system
- Total air temperature
