= IAT =

Iat is a minor ancient Egyptian goddess.

The abbreviation IAT may refer to:

== Organisations ==
- Immigration Appeal Tribunal
- Indonesia Air Transport, an Indonesian airline
- Institut aérotechnique, a French research Institute in aerodynamics
- Institute for Affordable Transportation, an American organization
- Institute of Armament Technology, now the Defence Institute of Advanced Technology, an Indian defense institution
- International Association of Trichologists
- Institute of Agricultural Technology, the former name of Kelappaji College of Agricultural Engineering and Technology

== Science and technology ==
- Implicit-association test, a measure within social psychology
- Import Address Table, in computer programming
- Indicated air temperature
- Indirect antiglobulin test, a clinical blood test
- Information access technology
- Intake air temperature
- International Atomic Time
- Information Assurance Technical, a category for Certified Information Systems Security Professional

== Other uses ==
- Indigenous Aryan Theory
- International ACH Transaction, a code used by the Automated Clearing House
- International Appalachian Trail, a hiking trail in the United States
- IISER Aptitude Test, an annual academic examination in India
- Iwate Asahi Television, a television station in Iwate Prefecture, Japan
- International Air Tattoo, the former name of a British air show
