= Moringa =

Moringa may refer to:

- Moringa (genus), a genus of plants
- Moringa oleifera, or just moringa, a plant species native to the Indian subcontinent
- Moringa stenopetala, a species in that genus commonly known as the African moringa

== See also ==
- Morinda (disambiguation)
- Morenga (disambiguation)
- Morina (disambiguation)
