= Murina (disambiguation) =

Murina is a genus of bats. It may also refer to:

- Murina (film), a 2021 film by Antoneta Alamat Kusijanović

== See also ==
- Morina (disambiguation)
