= Morina (disambiguation) =

Morina is a genus of the angiosperm family Morinaceae.

Morina may also refer to:

- Morina (surname)
- Morina, a Basic Transportation Vehicle developed by GM and built in Indonesia in the late 1970s
- Mořina, a municipality and village in the Beroun District of the Czech Republic
- Morina (moth), a genus of moth
- Rhinophis or Morina, a genus of nonvenomous shield tail snakes found in southern India and Sri Lanka
- Morina (region), a region of the Gjakova Highlands in Kosovo
- Morina (tribe), an Albanian tribe
- Morinë, definite Albanian: Morina, a village of Albania at the border with Kosovo

== See also ==
- Igoris Morinas (born 1976), Lithuanian international footballer
- Morin
- Morini
