= Morenga =

Morenga may refer to:

- Jacob Morenga (c. 1875–1907), Namibian chief leader in the insurrection against Germany
- Morenga (novel), German novel by Uwe Timm from 1978
- Morenga (film), German drama film by Egon Günther from 1985

== See also ==
- Moringa (disambiguation)
