= SpaceAge Control =

SpaceAge Control, Inc.
- Type: Private
- Industry: Manufacturing Sensor
- Founded: 1968
- Headquarters: Palmdale, California
- Products: 3D Displacement Sensors
- Website: https://spaceagecontrol.com/

SpaceAge Control is a design, development, and sourcing services firm. The firm focuses on sensing and measurement devices and systems to include:

- air data (ground, air, space) probes and sensors
- displacement/position transducers and sensors
- planar and hemispherical coordinate sensors (measurement in two and three dimensions (2D, 3D))
- other devices dealing with pressure, airflow, temperature, and displacement

The company has supplied precision displacement sensors to industries worldwide since 1969. During its history, the company created ongoing displacement sensing innovations starting with miniature and subminiature string potentiometers (1968) and 2D and 3D cable-actuated displacement sensors (1974).

SpaceAge Control facility in Palmdale, California, US

== History ==
SpaceAge Control was established in 1968 to design, develop, and manufacture pilot protection devices in support of space-based and high-performance test aircraft programs. In 1970, the company was awarded a NASA contract to produce precision, small-format position transducers for aircraft flight control testing. The successful completion of this contract led to the development and production of a complete line of innovative, small-size position transducers.

In 1974, the company was tasked with producing a multi-dimensional "swivel head" air data probe to enhance total and static pressure accuracy at the high angles of attack associated with rotary wing aircraft. The resulting product, the 100510 air data boom, is used for flight test air data sensing requirements to include STOL, VSTOL, rotary wing, business jet, military transport, and general aviation aircraft.

Through the 1970s, 1980s, and 1990s, significantly all U.S., Canadian, and European aerospace companies used the company's air data products and position transducers in their research, development, and test activities. Often, these products were designed and manufactured to custom specifications.

In 1989, the company began its focus on unmanned aerial vehicles (UAVs) with the development and introduction of the 100400 miniature air data boom. That product use led to the adoption of SpaceAge Control air data products on a broad range of unmanned aircraft to include aerial targets, autonomous vehicles, and experimental vehicles.

== Businesses ==
=== 3D Displacement Measurement ===
- OEM displacement sensors
- MMI (man-machine-interface) sensors
- CMM (coordinate measurement machine) sensors
