= Basic utility vehicle =

A basic utility vehicle (BUV) is a simple rugged vehicle designed for use in the developing world. A slew of such vehicles were developed in the late 1960s and early 1970s; most only reached limited production and market penetration, as used Western vehicles often proved cheaper. In Southeast Asia, these are often referred to as Asian utility vehicles (AUV). They have also been called basic transportation vehicles (BTV).

== 1960s ==
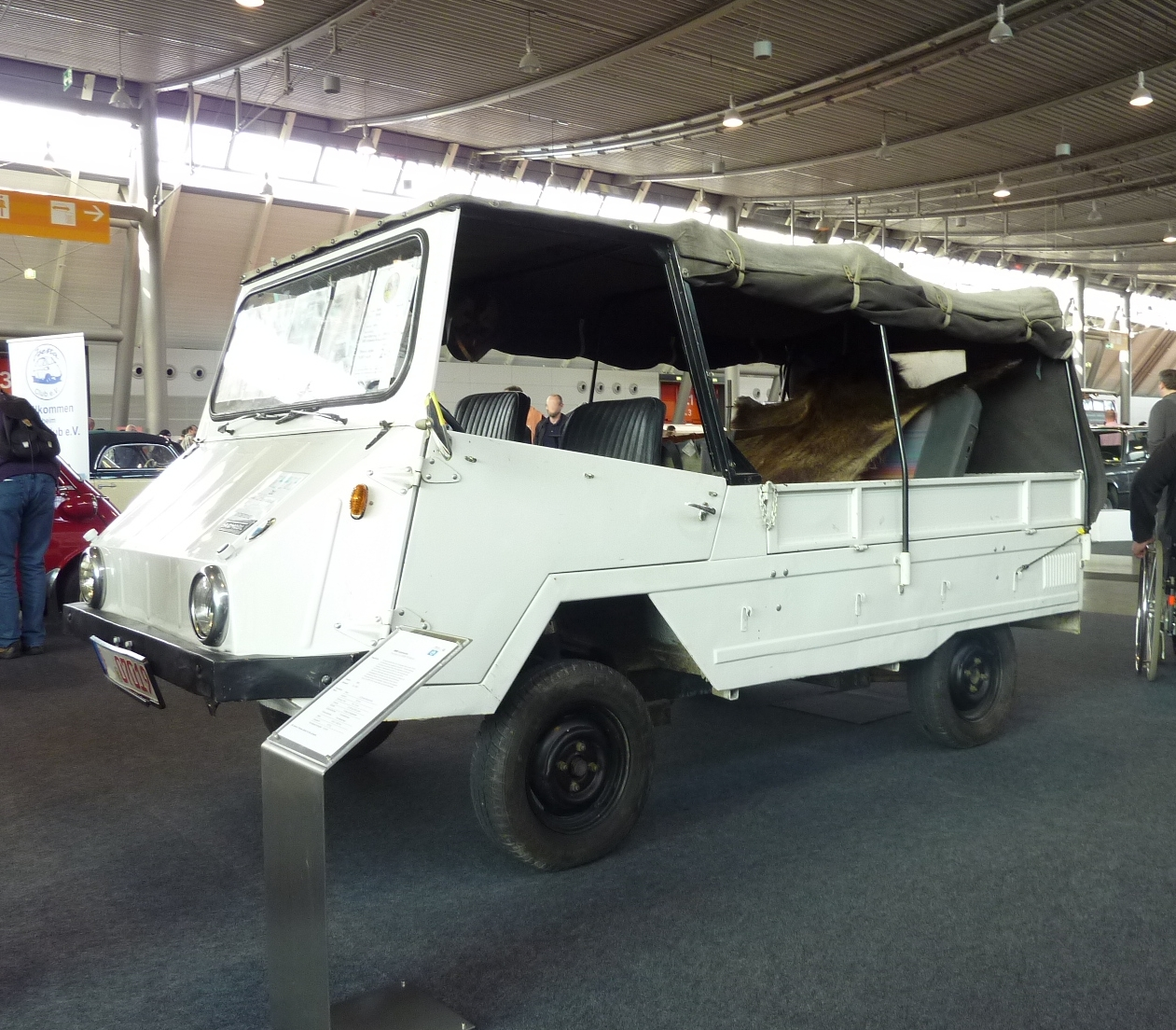
Farmobil

Greek financier Peter Kondorgouris began producing a small utility vehicle called the Farmobil, based on a 1957 design by Wilfried Fahr of Switzerland. Using BMW engines, about 1000 were built between 1962 and 1966. The Farco company was taken over by Chrysler in the mid-sixties and they took over distribution in many markets.

== 1970s ==
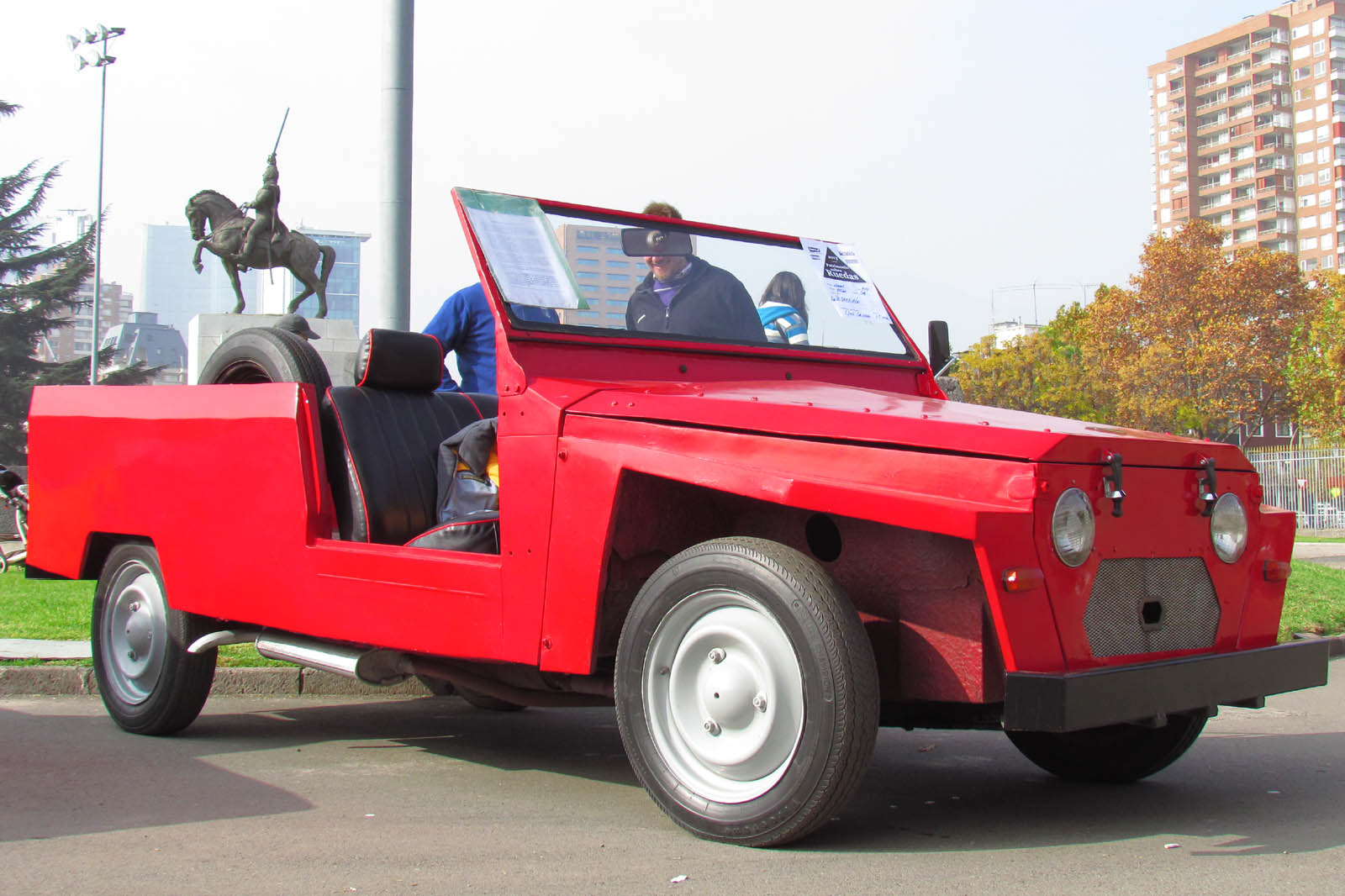
Chile's Citroën Yagán, a version of the Baby Brousse

Basic utility vehicles were developed by Ford and GM specifically for sale in East Asia, with the intent of opening new markets there and in Africa. Volkswagen also developed a vehicle, the EA489 Basistransporter which was built from 1975 until 1979. Dutch DAF developed a stillborn competitor for this field, the 1972 BATU (Basic Automotive Transport Unit) General Motors' BTV effort was sold under a variety of different names and used the Vauxhall Viva's underpinnings and 1256 cc inline-four engine. It was built in Ecuador, El Salvador, Honduras, Guatemala, Malaysia, Costa Rica, Paraguay, Portugal, and the Philippines. It was marketed as the GM Amigo, Andino (Ecuador), Chato (Guatemala), Cherito (El Salvador), Compadre (Honduras), Mitaí (Paraguay), and Bedford Harimau ("Tiger", Malaysia).

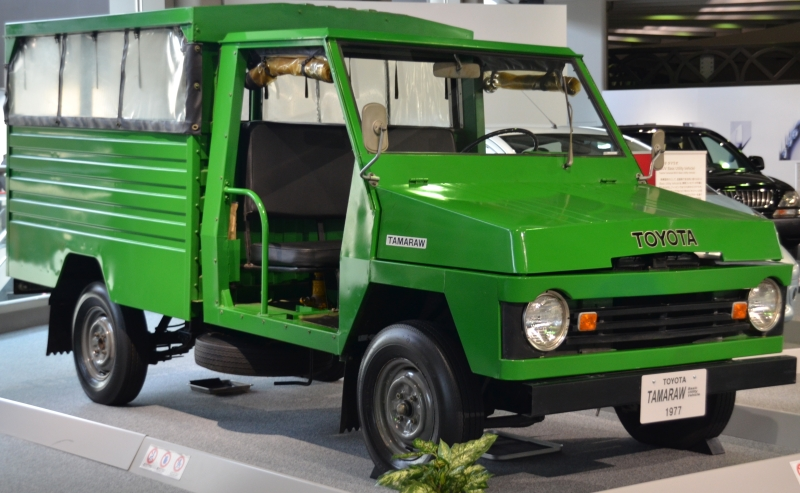
The 1977 Toyota Tamaraw

Citroën's FAF and Baby Brousse also fit this mold, with the acronym FAF standing for "Easy to Finance, Easy to Build." The FAF and related versions entered production in ten countries, most of them in the developing world. Over 30,000 were built from 1973 until the 1980s. Nissan called their Datsun 1200 AX a "BTV", it was introduced in June 1977 and received their 1171 cc A12 engine. Nissan/Datsun built it in Thailand (Siam Motors) and in Portugal, where it was called the Datsun Sado. The most successful BUV is arguably the Toyota Kijang, which entered production in Indonesia and the Philippines (as the Tamaraw) in 1977 and 1976. The Kijang/Tamaraw has, over five generations, morphed into a fairly luxurious Compact MPV called the Toyota Innova. It even spawned rivals in the Philippine market. Those include the Ford Fiera (later known as Nissan Bida), Isuzu KC 20, Mitsubishi Cimarron, and the GM Harabas (made by General Motors).

One thing that unites the various Basic Utility Vehicles of this era is that they used almost exclusively flat, welded sheetmetal, giving them a certain uniformity of appearance. Later yet, the independent, wood-bodied Africar project again tried to target developing markets, Africa in particular. Only six were built from 1986 until the company folded in 1988.

== 2000s ==
With the steady supply of lightly used vehicles from Western markets proving more desirable than the spartan BUVs, the BUV idea largely faded during the 1980s.

BUV Design Competition

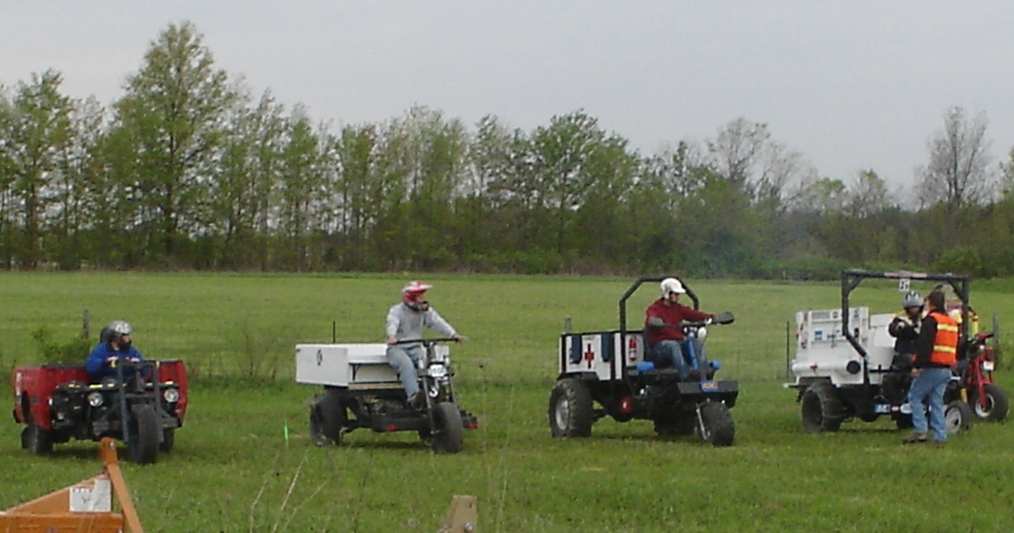
Basic Utility Vehicle competition

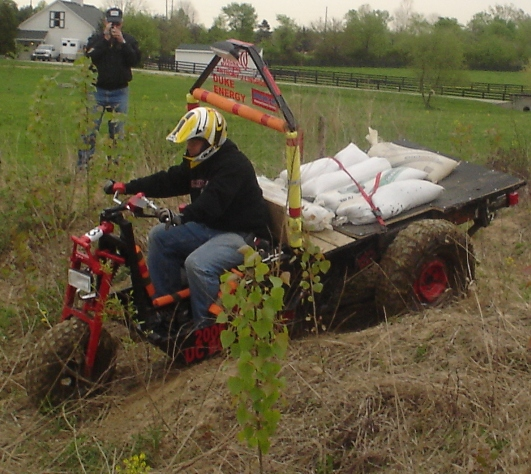
A three-wheeled BUV on a mogul run

The Institute for Affordable Transportation sponsors an annual BUV Design Competition where engineering students bring their vehicles for judging and performance evaluation (including cost) and contribute to IAT's research and development efforts. This is an effort to develop a simple, low-cost utility vehicle that can benefit low-income people in rural areas of developing countries.

Student teams design and build these vehicles to compete in a series of tests and events to determine the best design. Each team also plans an oral report aimed towards the judges and spectators. In the reports, students discuss the planning, building, and testing processes that each BUV went through prior to the competition. Because the BUV must account for a lack of infrastructure, the vehicles must pass a variety of tests during the competition including an obstacle course, mud pit, mogul field, and endurance track. Many of the students work on the BUV as a senior capstone project at the end of their engineering degree.

== See also ==
- Institute for Affordable Transportation
- Student Design Competition
- Formula SAE
