= Morina (surname) =

Morina is an Albanian surname. Notable people with the surname include:

- Durim Morina, real name of Mirud (singer) (born 1994), American singer-songwriter of Albanian descent
- Geldona Morina (born 1993), German association football player
- Gëzim Morina (born 1992), Slovene basketball player
- Giulio Morina (1550–1609), Italian painter
- Mario Morina (born 1992), Albanian footballer
- Rrahman Morina (1943–1990), Yugoslav (Kosovan Albanian) police officer and political figure
- Sally Sussman Morina (born 1956), American television soap opera writer and producer, wife of Anthony
