= Bedford Beagle =

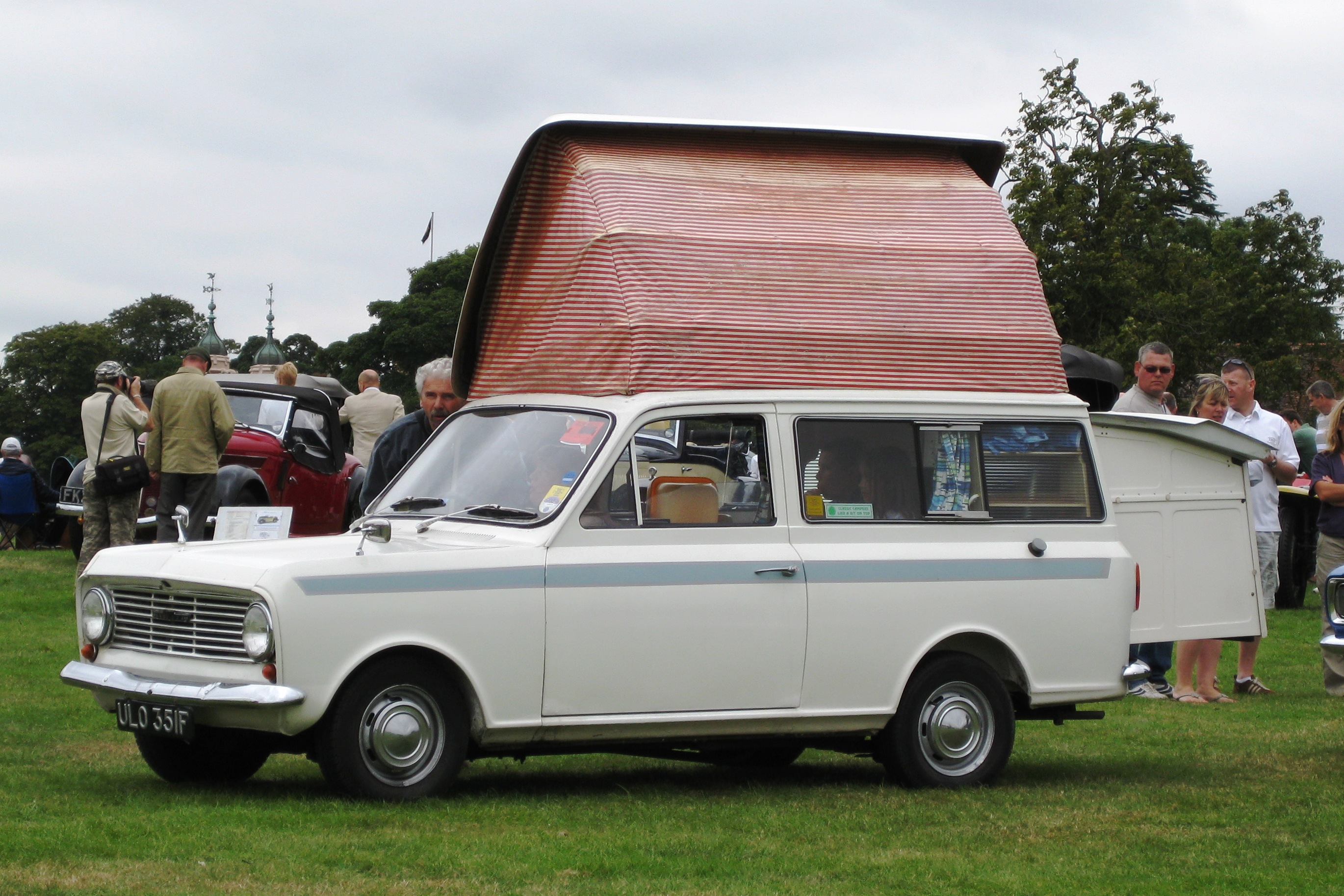
- The Beagle-based Bedford Roma motorhome

Overview
- Manufacturer: Bedford Vehicles
- Production: 1964-1973

Body and chassis
- Class: Estate car
- Layout: Longitudinal front engine, rear-wheel drive
- Related: Bedford HA

Chronology
- Successor: Viva HC estate versions

The Bedford Beagle is an estate car conversion of the Bedford HA 8cwt van, which itself was based on the Vauxhall Viva HA. It was launched at the 1964 London Motor Show.

The conversions were undertaken by Martin Walter Ltd in Folkestone, Kent, most famous for Dormobile campers based upon the larger Bedford CA commercial vans. Whilst the vans were very common at one time, the Beagle was altogether rarer and there are very few left today.

The Beagle formed the basis of the Roma, a camper van that was marketed in standard and deluxe forms, both featuring standing headroom of 77 in (200 cm) and a full-length 72 in (180 cm) double bed. A third bunk, fitted into the canopy of the elevated roof, is a feature of the deluxe version of the Roma.

Introduced in 1964, originally with the 1057 cc engine mated to a 4-speed gearbox, the Beagle was basic, with drum brakes all round and minimal interior trim. Later engine upgrades arrived in 1967 (1159 cc) and 1972 (1256 cc), bringing the top speed up from 72 mph (116 km/h) to about 80 mph (129 km/h), but the Beagle was finally discontinued in 1973. It was more or less replaced by the superior Viva HC estate cars.
