= El Compadre (car) =

Honduran pickup truck

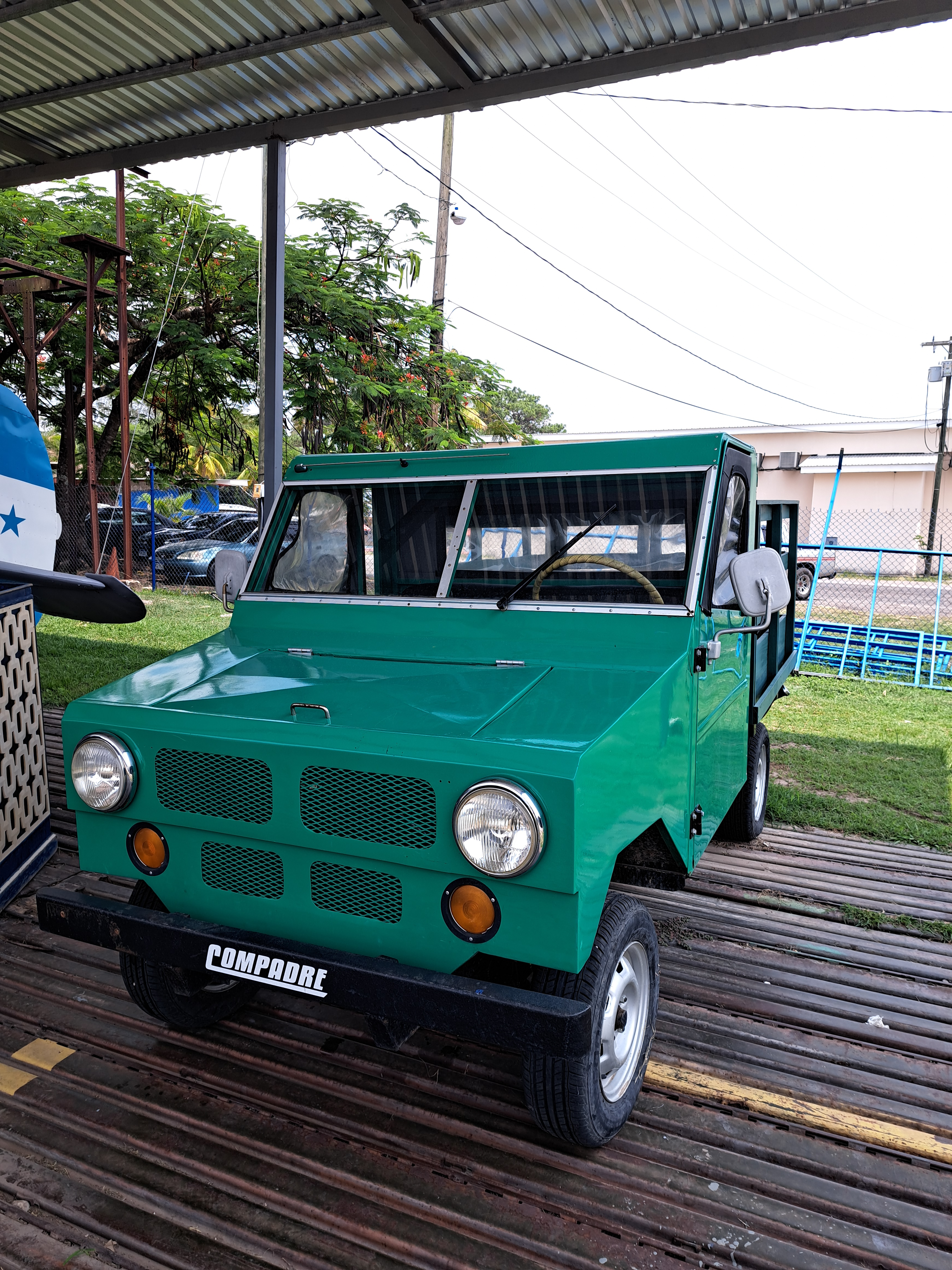
El Compadre

El Compadre (The Buddy) was a pickup truck of Honduran origin manufactured during the 1970s and 1980s.

== History ==
In 1970, Honduras experienced a military dictatorship led by Oswaldo Lopez Arellano. He took power via a coup that kept the country in relative calm. Honduras had one the lowest crime rates in the Americas. Under Arellano he country maintained economic stability and infrastructure projects were carried out. At the beginning of the decade, and with the help of General Motors, the local manufacture of a truck began. While less advanced than imported trucks, it was useful in rural areas and was affordable.

The engine was from Bedford Vehicles, imported from the United Kingdom. The truck was assembled by Centroamericana de Ensamblaje y Fabricación, near Toncontín airport. Sales were light because the design did not appeal to buyers.

== Characteristics ==
It was a small and efficient truck. It was rated to carry half a ton, but in practice it carried three times as much. It had a two-person cabin and a cargo bed and could reach 120 km/h.

=== Variants ===
Other Central American countries began to imitate the vehicle. Similar models were sold in Nicaragua, El Salvador, Guatemala and Costa Rica under the names "Pinolero", "Cherito", "Chato" and "Amigo", respectively.

== See also ==
- Bedford HA
- Basic utility vehicle
- History of Honduras
