= Freezing air temperature =

Air temperature below the freezing point of water

Freezing or frost occurs when the air temperature falls below the freezing point of water (0 °C, 32 °F, 273 K). This is usually measured at the height of 1.2 metres above the ground surface.

There exist some scales defining several degrees of frost severity (from "slight" to "very severe") but they depend on location thus the usual temperatures occurring in winter. The primary symptom of frost weather is that water freezes. If the temperature is low for sufficiently long time, freezing will occur with some delay in lakes, rivers, and the sea. It can occur even in water supply networks, although this is highly undesirable and efforts are made to prevent this from happening.

== Terminology ==
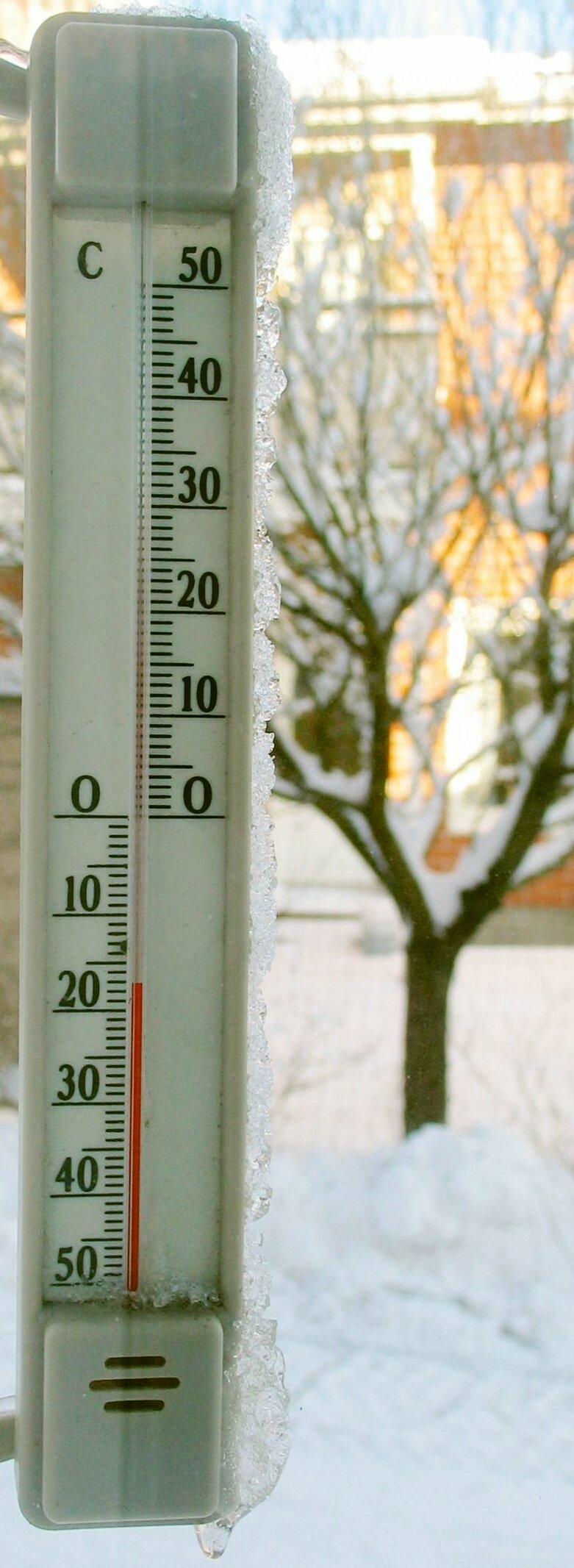
In the southern part of Finland, -15 °C (5 °F) is considered the limit of severe frost. The thermometer in the picture shows -17 °C (1.4 °F).

The English word "frost" has 2 base meanings that are related to each other but nevertheless sufficiently different:

- temperature of air below the freezing point of water (ca 273 K)
- deposit of ice on cold surfaces

The WMO avoids the word "frost" alone and uses

- "freezing" for temperature of air below the freezing point of water
- "hoar frost" and "ground frost" for deposit of ice on cold surfaces (see Hoar frost)

== Relation between freezing and hoar frost or ground frost ==
A temperature at or below freezing is not absolutely necessary to get ground frost or hoar frost; they can form even if air temperature is marginally above freezing point if the sky is clear. This is because the ground loses heat due to radiation. It radiates its heat to the sky/space. The amount of heat that radiates is proportional to the difference of the fourth power of the temperatures between the two objects. At night, the atmosphere is not being warmed by the sun and the sky/space can approach 2.7 K (the blackbody temperature of the cosmic microwave background radiation). On a clear night the ground can become colder than the air because it radiates its heat to the sky, and ground frost can form. On the other hand, a temperature below the freezing point of water does not mean that hoar frost must occur.

== See also ==
- Freezing (the physical aspect)
- Permafrost (permanently frozen ground)
- Frost and Rime (deposit of ice on cold surfaces)
