= Morinë =

- Village
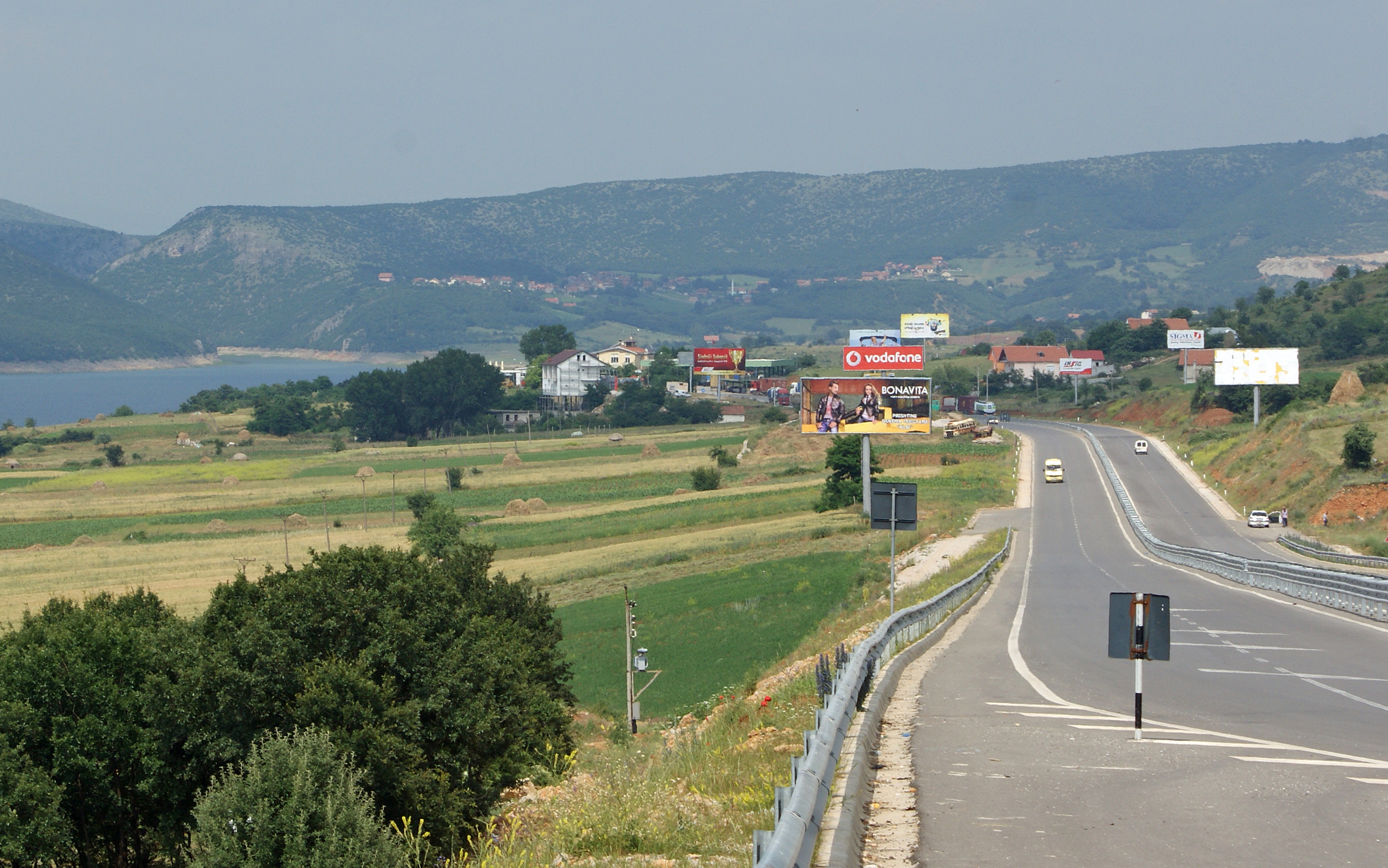
- Morinë village

- Location within Albania
- Coordinates: 42°8′55″N 20°32′22″E
- Country: Albania
- County: Kukës
- Municipality: Kukës
- Administrative unit: Tërthore
- Time zone: UTC+1 (CET)
  - Summer (DST): UTC+2 (CEST)

Morinë is a settlement in eastern Albania, on the border with Kosovo. The Kosovo side of the border is Vërmica. At the 2015 local government reform it became part of the municipality Kukës.

Morinë is an important stop on the highway that connects the Kosovan capital of Pristina to Albania and thus to the Adriatic Sea.

== See also ==
- Morina (disambiguation)
