= Volkswagen EA489 Basistransporter =

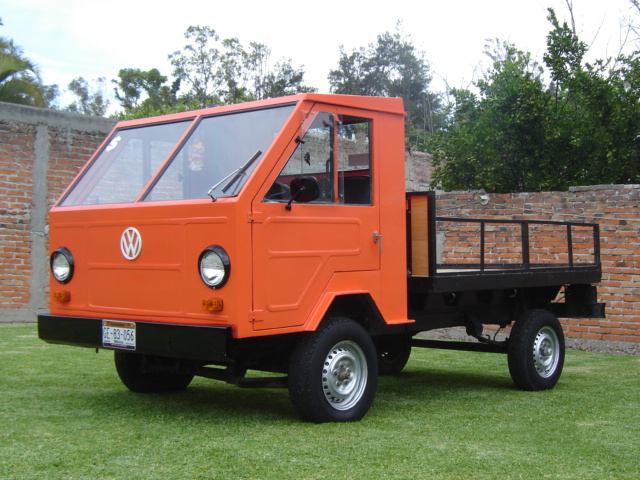

Overview
- Manufacturer: Volkswagen AG
- Also called: Volkswagen Hormiga (Mexico); Volkswagen EA489 (Turkey); Volkswagen Mitra (Indonesia); Volkswagen Trakbayan (Philippines)
- Production: 1976–1978 (Germany); 1977–1979 (Mexico)
- Assembly: West Germany: Hannover; Indonesia: Jakarta (P.T. Garuda Mataram); Mexico: Puebla; Philippines: Manila (DMG Inc.)

Body and chassis
- Class: Basic utility vehicle
- Body style: two-door platform truck
- Layout: Front engine, front-wheel drive
- Related: Teijo (Finland)

Powertrain
- Engine: 1.6 L Volkswagen air-cooled
- Transmission: 4-speed manual

Dimensions
- Wheelbase: 2,395 mm (94.3 in)
- Length: 4,064 mm (160.0 in)
- Width: 1,684 mm (66.3 in) at cab
- Height: 1,988 mm (78.3 in)
- Kerb weight: 1,290 kg (2,844 lb)

The Volkswagen EA489 Basistransporter is a small front-wheel drive platform truck with a front-mounted Volkswagen air-cooled engine. Created by Volkswagen AG, it is about the size of a modern-day Volkswagen Polo and is perhaps one of the rarest Volkswagens in the world because it was never sold in a developed market.

== History ==
It was built between 1976 and 1978, with only 2,600 units produced in completely knocked down kits in Hanover, Germany; and 3,600 units were produced in Puebla, Mexico, between 1977 and 1979 for the Mexican market where it was known as the Hormiga. The car was developed to compete with recent very basic utility vehicles developed by Ford and GM specifically for sale in East Asia, with the intent of opening new markets there and in Africa.

In Finland a truck called the Teijo, closely related to the EA-489, was built by the Wihuri Group from 1975 until 1976. About 200 were made, with some sent to Africa as foreign aid.

It was evaluated for production in the following countries: Australia, New Zealand, Papua New Guinea, Philippines, Pakistan, Indonesia, Turkey and Mexico. It was built and sold in Turkey as the EA489, in the Philippines as the Trakbayan ("Country Truck" in Filipino), in Indonesia as the Mitra ("Partner"), and in Mexico as the Hormiga ("Ant" in Spanish).

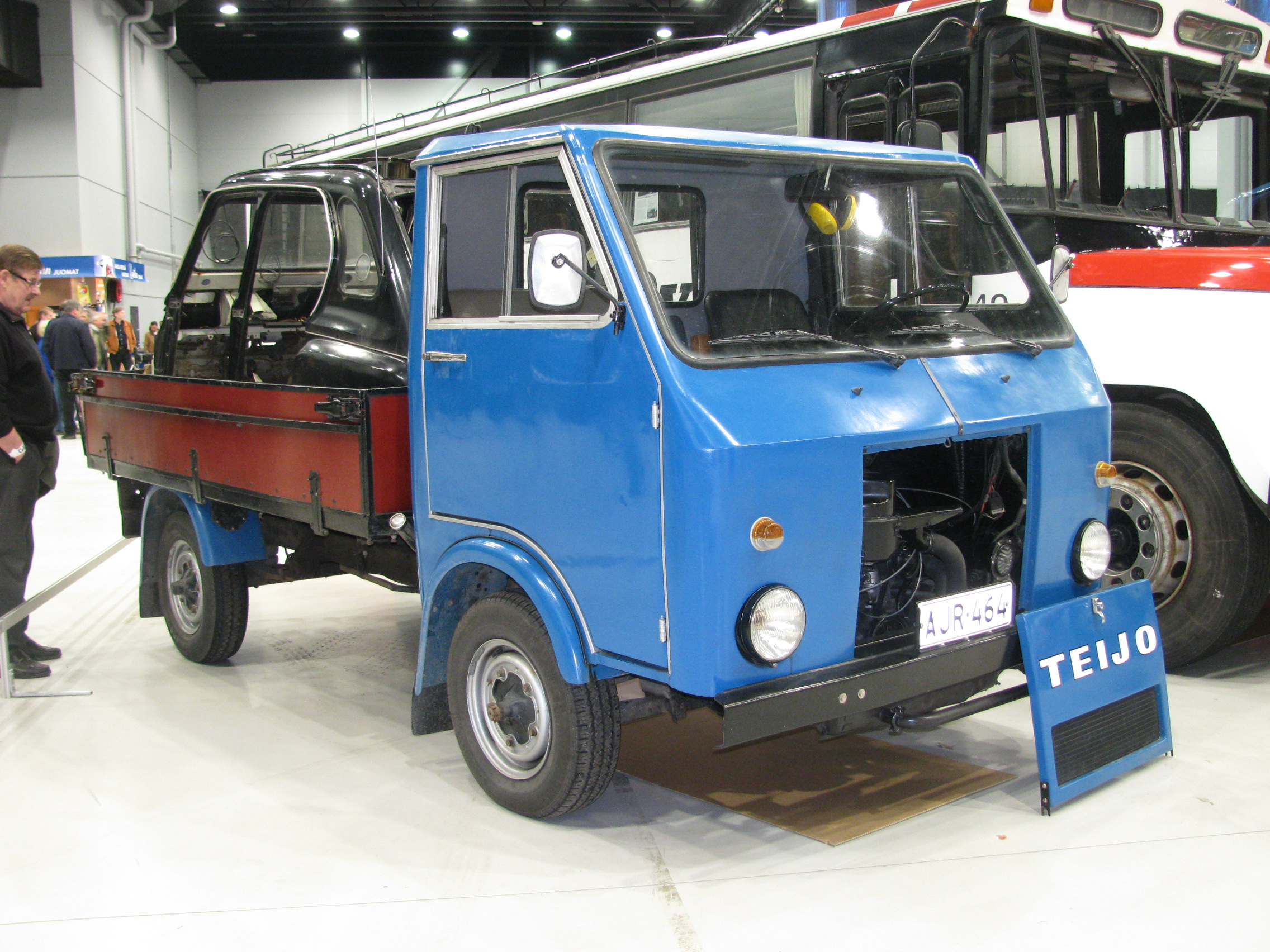
The Finnish Teijo truck

The Indonesian Mitra, built by P.T. Garuda Mataram Motor Company in Jakarta, featured the cowl of a Volkswagen Type 2 (T2b). A number of bodystyles, ranging from a naked cowl to an ambulance, were available. The Mitra's T2b body featured a front-mounted grille, and the pickup variations featured a bed more distinctly separated than the beds of its T2 cousins. A 93 km/h (58 mph) top speed was promised.

In the Philippines, the Trakbayan was built by DMG Inc. It had variations like the low-side and high-side pickups, van, and jeepney.

== Specifications ==
- Chassis: simple ladder frame
- Engine configuration: air-cooled flat four-cylinder 'boxer', overhead valve (OHV) with pushrods
- Engine displacement: 1,584 cubic centimetres (96.7 cu in)
- Motive DIN power: 33 kilowatts (45 PS; 44 bhp) at 4,000 revolutions per minute, 37 kW (50 PS; 50 bhp)
- Powertrain layout: front-mounted engine (under the cab), front-wheel drive
- Suspension
  - Front – independent, longitudinal torsion bars and wishbones
  - Rear – rigid unpowered solid axle with leaf springs
- Roadwheels: 4.5J × 14-inch
- Maximum speed: 85 kilometres per hour (52.8 mph)
- Payload: 1,000 kilograms (2,205 lb)

Italics indicate Mexican-specified Hormiga
