= Datsun Sado =

Overview
- Manufacturer: Nissan
- Also called: Datsun 1200 AX
- Production: 1977–198x
- Assembly: Portugal (Entreposto Comercial); Thailand: Samut Prakan (Siam Motors and Nissan Co.)

Body and chassis
- Class: Basic utility vehicle
- Body style: 2-door pickup; Station wagon; Van
- Layout: Front-engine, rear-wheel-drive
- Chassis: Body-on-frame

Powertrain
- Engine: 1.2 L A12 OHV I4

Dimensions
- Wheelbase: 2,370 mm (93.3 in)
- Length: 3,800 mm (149.6 in)
- Width: 1,600 mm (63.0 in)
- Curb weight: 865–1,050 kg (1,907–2,315 lb)

The Datsun Sado is a small Basic Transportation Vehicle, developed to be built in developing nations and requiring minimal up front investments. The overall layout and design was extremely minimal and simple, with flat, welded sheet metal bodywork and a simple chassis derived from the Datsun Sunny Cab/Nissan Cherry Cab. The engine was the same A12, pushrod four-cylinder unit as was used in the Sunny. Power was 69 PS (51 kW), one horsepower more than in the Japanese model, presumably the result of no emissions control equipment having been installed. Maximum load capacity was 750 kg (1,653 lb) and the Sado truck could seat three people abreast in the cabin.

The Sado was designed for various levels of knocked-down production, maximizing local parts content, albeit typically with mechanicals imported from Japan. It was first presented in Thailand in June 1977, where it was assembled by Siam Motors as the Datsun AX 1200. It was also built by Entreposto in Portugal, where it was sold as the Sado.
