= Synthetic air data system =

Type of air data system

A synthetic air data system (SADS) is an alternative air data system that can produce synthetic air data quantities without directly measuring the air data. It uses other information such as GPS, wind information, the aircraft's attitude, and aerodynamic properties to estimate or infer the air data quantities. Though air data includes altitude, airspeed, pressures, air temperature, Mach number, and flow angles (e.g., angle of attack and angle of sideslip), existing known SADS primarily focuses on estimating airspeed, angle of attack, and angle of sideslip. SADS is used to monitor the primary air data system if there is an anomaly due to sensor faults or system faults. It can also be potentially used as a backup to provide air data estimates for any aerial vehicle.

== Functionality ==
Synthetic air data systems can potentially reduce risk by creating an extra layer of redundancy (analytical redundancy) to the mechanical air data system such as the pitot-static systems and angle vanes. It can also be used to detect failures of other subsystems through data compatibility checks.

== History ==
The idea of SADS has been around since the 1980s. The basic idea is to use non air data sensors such as inertial measurement unit (IMU) and GPS fused with vehicle dynamics models to estimate air data triplet airspeed, angle of attack, and angle of sideslip (either separately or combined). Most of the earlier work used vehicle dynamics models to estimate air data in both aircraft and spacecraft applications. This approach is sometimes referred to as the aerodynamic model-based SADS. However, the aerodynamic model-based SADS is challenging to implement because it is difficult to obtain accurate vehicle dynamics models possessing the fidelity needed to yield the required accuracy in the air data estimates. To address this issue, model-free SADS has been proposed recently. The model-free SADS does not require the vehicle dynamics models. Instead, it relies on the accuracy of the Inertial navigation system (INS) and Three-Dimensional (3D) wind estimates.

SADS has gained a lot of renewed interest after the Air France Flight 447 accident in 2009. Several universities and government agencies such as the University of Minnesota, Delft University of Technology, NASA Langley Research Center, and the Institute of Flight Mechanics and Flight Control at the Technical University of Munich, have been researching the SADS related topics. Recent patents related to SADS have been filed by the leading air data system producers such as Collins Aerospace and Honeywell. Moreover, the recent two Boeing 737 MAX accidents (Lion Air Flight 610 (2018) and Ethiopian Airlines Flight 302 (2019)) have brought SADS into the spotlight again, which is detailed by the report. In particular, synthetic airspeed has become a focal point to improve Boeing aircraft's safety.

=== Commercial Aircraft ===
SADS has been implemented in some of the most advanced modern commercial aircraft such as the Boeing 787. The ADS on Boeing 787 calculates a synthetic airspeed from the angle of attack measurement, inertial data, accurate lift coefficient, and aircraft mass (validated after takeoff). The synthetic airspeed has helped the Boeing 787 recover from the erroneous airspeed measurement.

=== Unmanned Aerial Vehicles ===
SADS has also been implemented for unmanned aerial vehicles (UAVs). The motivation of SADS for UAVs is that most of the low-cost air data systems on the small Unmanned Aircraft System (UAS) are not reliable. Also, having multiple air data sensors (e.g., pitot tubes) on small UAVs is not feasible due to stringent size, weight, and power constraints. SADS can significantly increase drones' overall reliability in both line-of-sight and beyond visual line-of-sight (BVLOS) drone operations. Recent academic research has focused on improving SADS's accuracy, fault detectability, and reliability of the ADS used on small UAS by leveraging SADS.

== Air Data Triplet ==
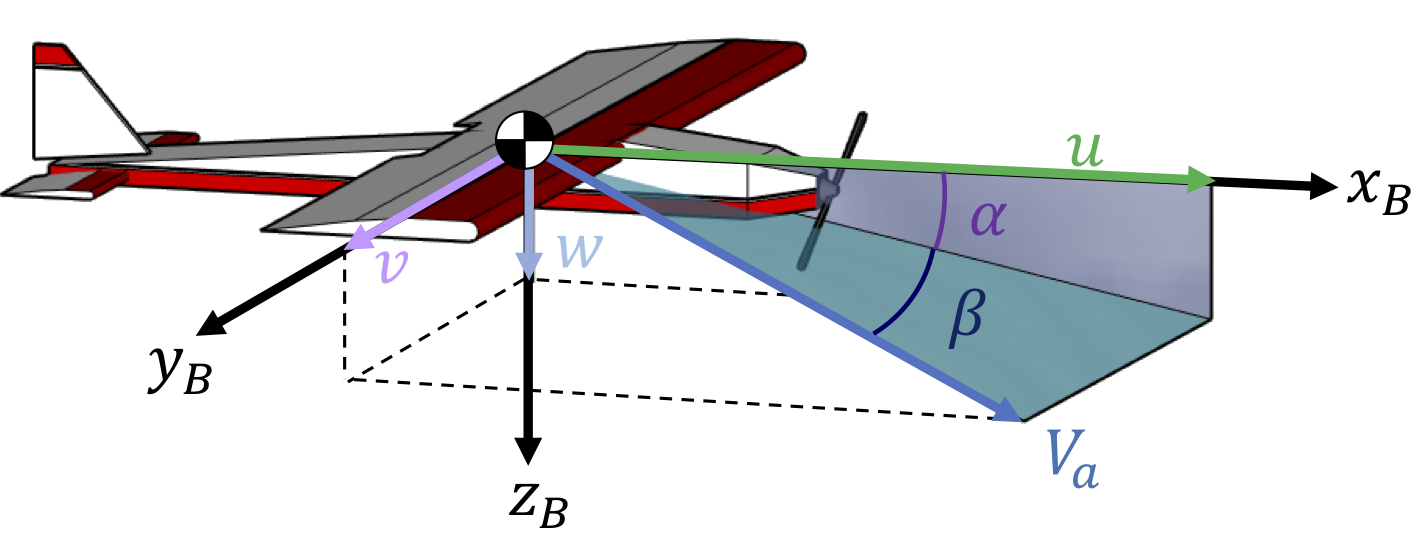
Definition of airspeed $V_a$, angle of attack $\alpha$ and angle of sideslip $\beta$ on a small Unmanned aerial vehicle.

The airspeed $V_a$, angle of attack $\alpha$, and angle of sideslip $\beta$ represents the air data triplet, and the current state of the art of SADS is to estimate these three quantities either together or separately. One way to estimate the air data triplet is use the wind triangle relationship. Mathematically, the wind triangle equation is shown below:

$$\big[\begin{array}{ccc} u & v & w \end{array} \big]^T = {\bf C}_n^b( \boldsymbol{\psi}^n_{nb} )\left[{\bf v}^n - {\bf W}^n\right]$$
where $u$, $v$, and $w$ are the translation velocity components expressed in the body frame, ${\bf C}_n^b( \boldsymbol{\psi}^n_{nb})$ is the coordinate transformation from North-East-Down (NED) frame to the body frame. The vector $\boldsymbol{\psi}^n_{nb} = \big[\phi ~\theta ~\psi \big]^T$ represents the attitude vector in roll, pitch, and yaw. The ${\bf v}^n$ and ${\bf W}^n$ represent the ground velocity and wind vector in the NED frame respectively.

If the $u$, $v$, and $w$ are known, the airspeed $V_a$, angle of attack $\alpha$ and angle of sideslip $\beta$ can be calculated as the following:

$$V_a = \sqrt{u^2 + v^2 + w^2}$$
$$\alpha  = \tan^{-1}\left(\dfrac{u}{v}\right)$$
$$\beta = \sin^{-1} \left(\dfrac{v}{\sqrt{u^2 + v^2 + w^2}}\right)$$

== Method ==
There are various methods to estimate or "synthesize" airspeed, angle of attack, and angle of sideslip without directly using the measured air data. For example, synthetic airspeed can be computed by using the ground velocity, angle of attack, wind velocity, airplane's pitch attitude and heading. The ground velocity is usually provided by GPS. The angle of attack measurements can come from the angle vanes. The wind velocity can be obtained by the airborne weather radar. The attitude of the airplane can be computed from the inertial navigation system. The exact computation of the synthetic airspeed can vary (e.g., small-angle approximation can be made to simplify the computation), but it is primarily based on the kinematic wind triangle equation. This method is sometimes referred to as the model-free SADS method; there is no vehicle model dynamics involved.

The model-based SADS leverages the vehicle dynamics model to help estimate the air data quantities. In particular, the aerodynamic coefficients are used to compute synthetic air data. For example, angle of attack $\alpha$ can be synthesized if the lift coefficient $C_L$, Mach number $M$, and altitude $h$ are known. Mathematically,

$$\alpha  = f(C_L,~M,~h)$$

The function $f(\cdot)$ that relates $C_L$ to $\alpha$ can be empirically determined by curve fitting the aerodynamic data. The accuracy of the model-based SADS depends on the accuracy of the aerodynamic coefficient. This accuracy constraint might not an issue for high performance aircraft such as F-15, but it can be quite difficult for low-cost UAVs.

Many model-based and model-free SADS utilize classical estimation methods such as Kalman filtering and least squares extensively to estimate air data when sensor fusion and real-time computing are required. Other non-conventional methods such as data-driven learning or machine learning based air data estimation algorithms have emerged in the last decade, but they are difficult to be certified due to the complexity of the algorithms.

== See also ==
- Air data computer
- Inertial navigation system
- Redundancy (engineering)
- Kalman filter
- Acronyms and abbreviations in avionics
- Central Air Data Computer, used on the F-14, the first microprocessor-based ADC
