= Giulio Morina =

Italian painter

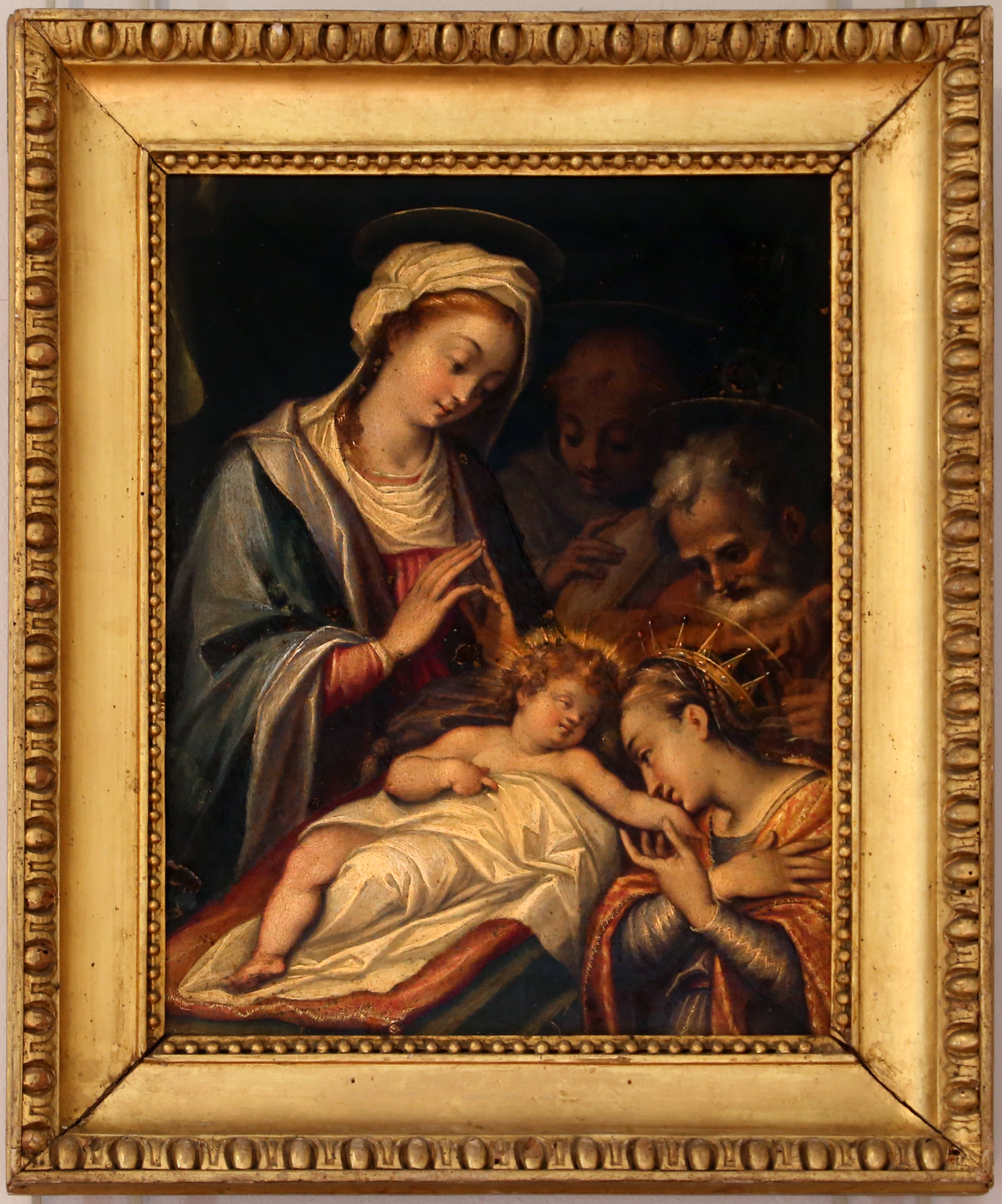
Madonna col Bambino e santi, Ajaccio, Musée Fesch

Giulio Morina (1550 in Bologna – 1609 in Mirandola) was an Italian painter active between 1570 and 1609 in Italy.

He was a pupil of Nicola Sabbatini. His works are preserved in the churches of Bologna.
