= Bedford HA =

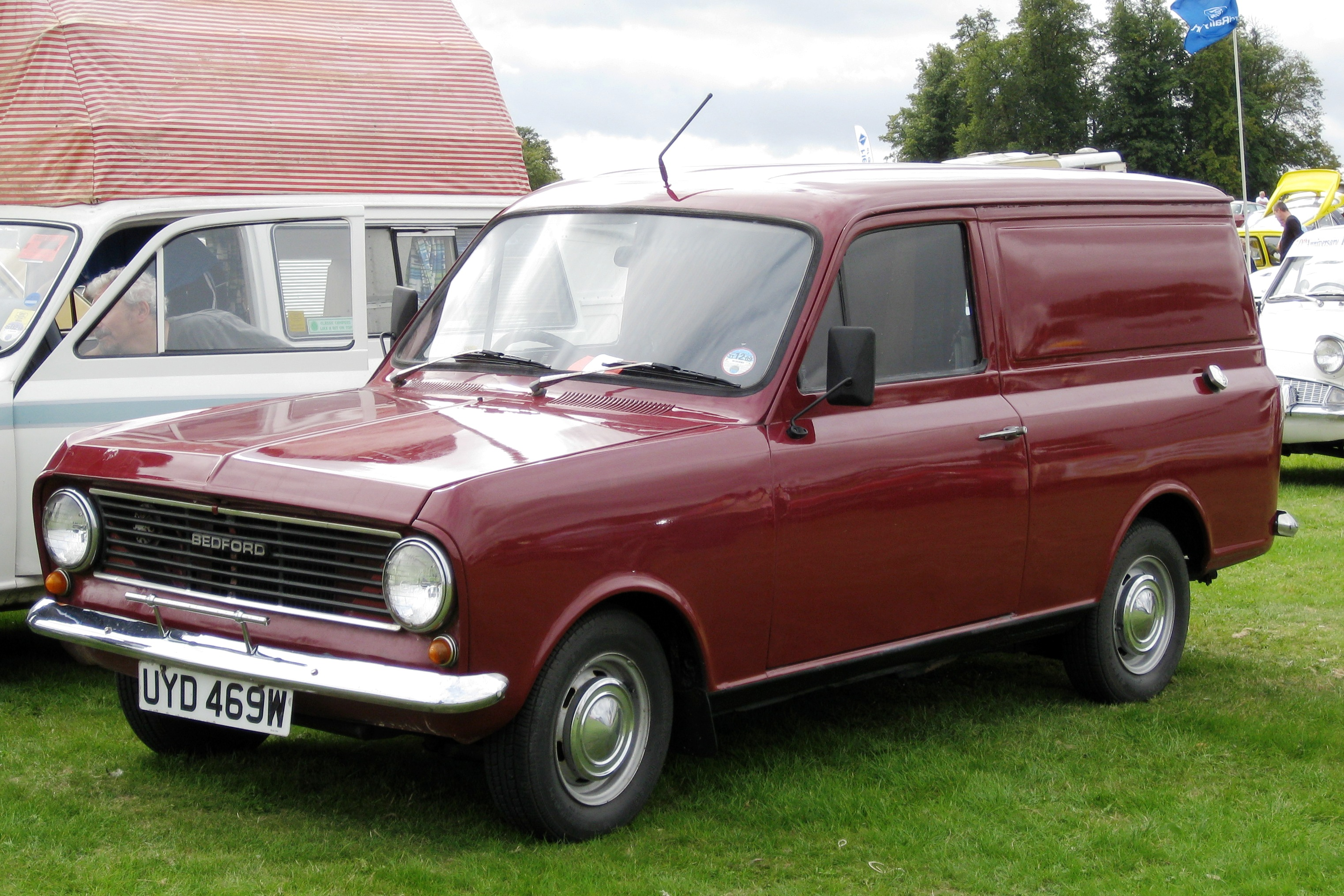
- 1981 Bedford HA

Overview
- Manufacturer: Bedford (Vauxhall Motors)
- Also called: Bedford Handi-Van (Australia)
- Production: 1964–1983
- Assembly: Luton, Bedfordshire, UK

Body and chassis
- Class: Light commercial vehicle
- Body style: Car derived van
- Layout: Longitudinal front engine, rear-wheel drive
- Related: Vauxhall Viva (HA); Bedford Beagle; General Motors BTV

Powertrain
- Engine: 1,057 cc OHV I4; 1,159 cc OHV I4; 1,256 cc OHV I4
- Transmission: 4-speed manual

Dimensions
- Wheelbase: 91.5 in (2,324 mm)
- Length: 150.2 in (3,815 mm)
- Width: 59.4 in (1,509 mm)
- Height: 59.5 in (1,511 mm)
- Kerb weight: 1,540–1,575 lb (699–714 kg) (1965); 1,651–1,706 lb (749–774 kg) (1977)

Chronology
- Predecessor: Bedford HC
- Successor: Bedford Astra Van; Bedford/Vauxhall Astramax

The Bedford HA was a car derived van introduced in August 1964 by Bedford, based on the Vauxhall Viva (HA) family car. It was also known as the Bedford Beagle in estate form and Bedford Roma in small campervan form. The Beagle was an officially sanctioned conversion based on the 8 cwt van, carried out by Martin Walter of Folkestone, Kent. The Beagle received rear side windows and a fold-down rear seat; leaving 28 inches (710 mm) of luggage space with the seat in use.

== History ==
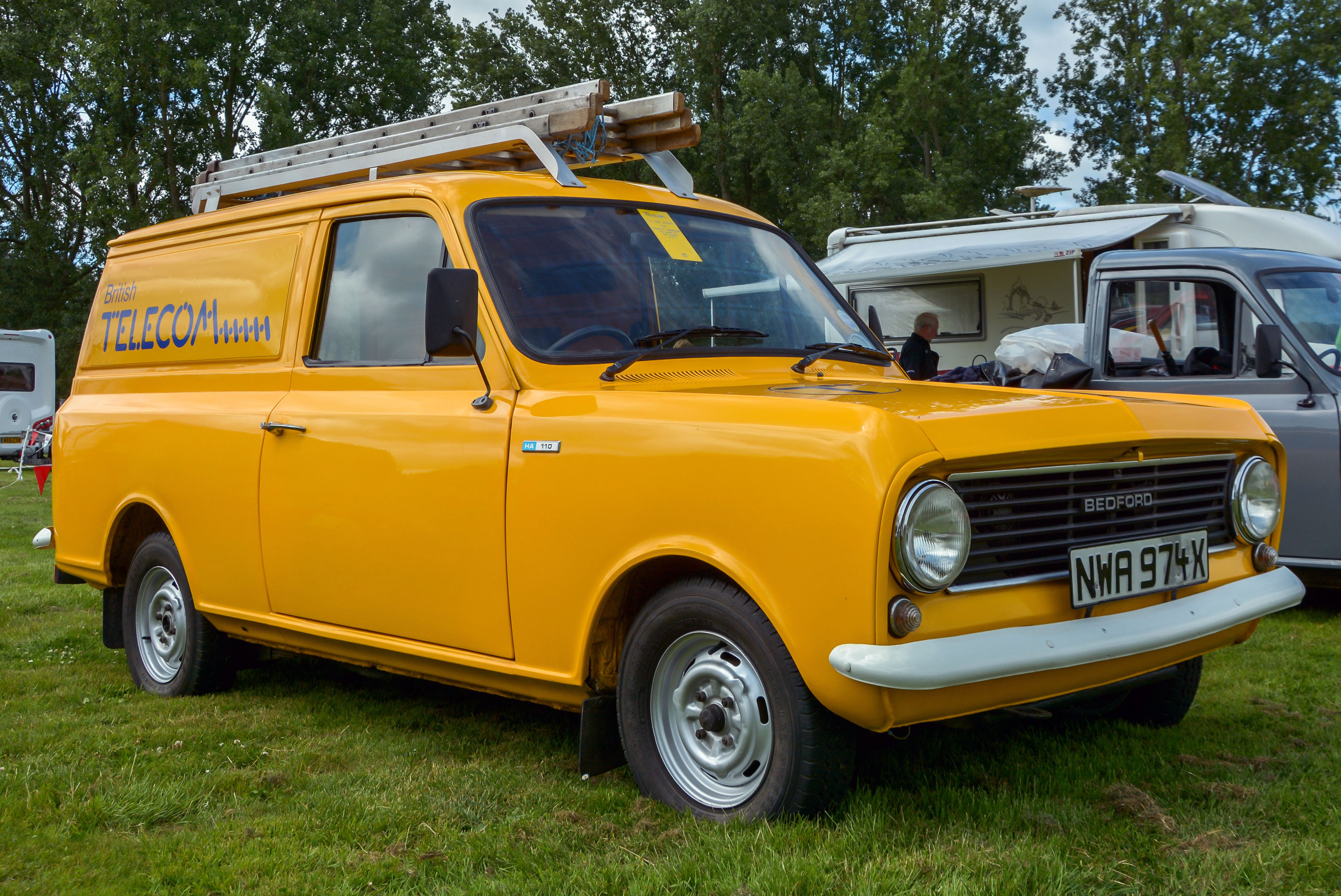
1981 British Telecom Bedford HA

The Bedford HA was extremely popular with utility companies in the United Kingdom, particularly the Royal Mail, British Rail, electricity boards, the GPO (later British Telecom (BT)), and British Gas. Many other firms such as British European Airways and Meals on Wheels services had large fleets as well. It was the inspiration for Postman Pat's original van. It was originally available in 6 cwt and heavier duty 8 cwt models (payloads of 670 or 900 lb; 300 or 410 kg), with the chassis codes HAE and HAV respectively. Gross vehicle weights were 2,400 and 2,615 lb (1,090 and 1,185 kg) respectively. The 8 cwt had a heavier rear axle, bigger tyres, and a sixth leaf in the rear springs. The 8 cwt was generally better equipped, offering a number of chromed trim parts (bumpers, mirrors, etcetera) and slightly plusher interior fittings. By 1971 the 6 cwt had been downgraded further yet, and now only came with a driver's seat as standard. A fold-down rear seat was available as an option.

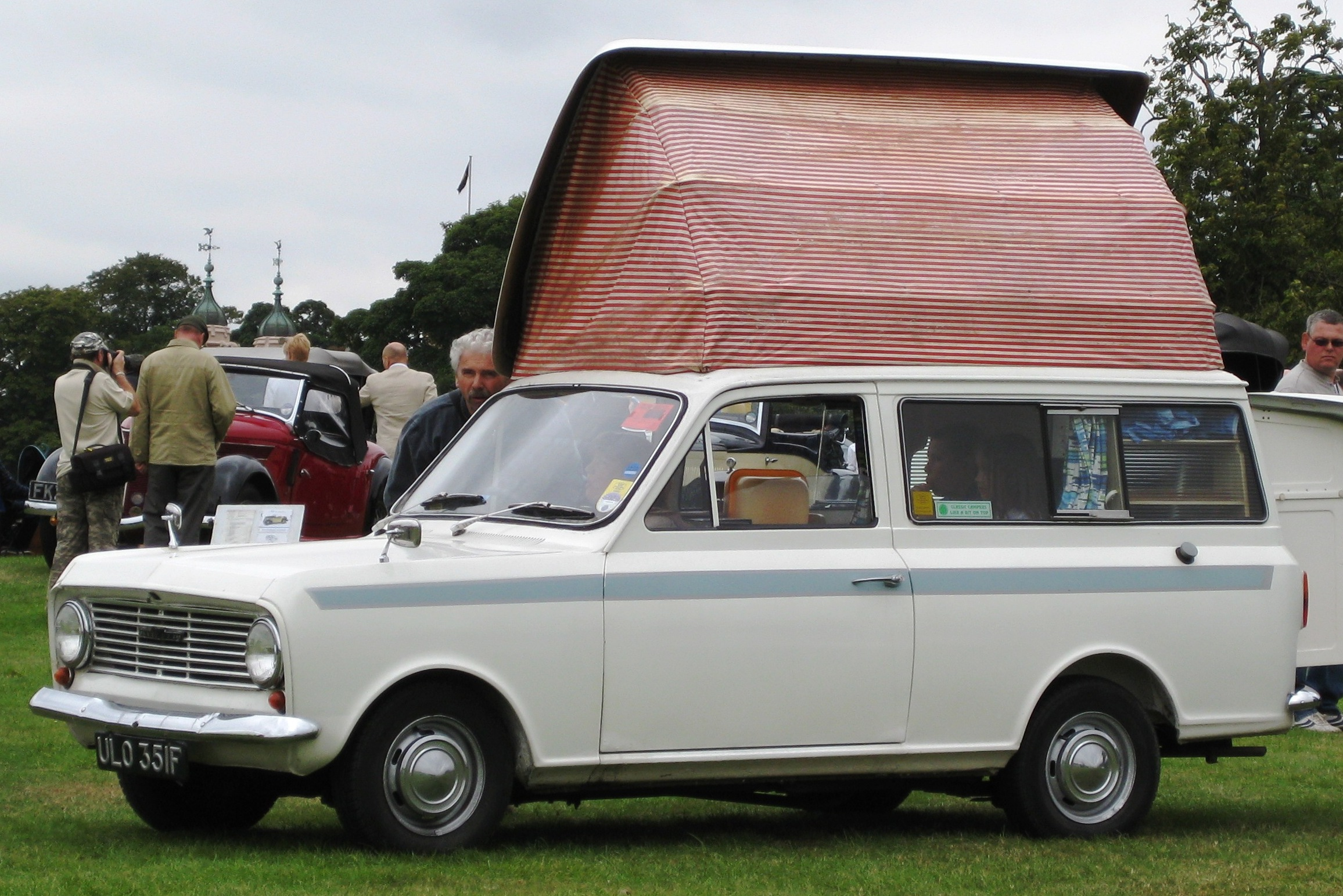
1968 Bedford Roma Mark I Deluxe

The Bedford Roma, a three-berth campervan with a sideways opening clamshell roof with canvas walls, was produced from October 1967 until 1973.

By the late seventies, the denominations had been changed to HA 110 and HA 130 respectively, with payload ratings of 371 and 546 kg (818 and 1,204 lb). In September 1964, for the 1965 model year, the Viva and HA Van received minor changes such as a quicker steering rack, new door trim, and a modified choke control. In Australia, the Bedford HA was sold as the "Bedford Handi-Van" from 1964 until 1970.

Production ended in September 1983, with 689,512 produced. It was replaced by a low-cost, "fleet" version of the Bedford Astra Van.

== Engines ==
The early 1,057 cc (64.5 cu in) version had a lower compression ratio than the Viva saloon (7.3:1 rather than the usual 8.5:1), producing 47.8 hp (35.6 kW) gross, or 40.3 hp (30.1 kW) net, both at 5,200 rpm. In 1967, the HA received the engine of the changed Viva. This 1,159 cc (70.7 cu in) was essentially the same as the earlier powerplant; although net power was down to a claimed 32.2 hp (24.0 kW) at 4,600 rpm. It ran on the lowest rated fuel and was fitted with a 17 mm (0.67 in)-bore carburettor for even higher fuel mileage. The later models powered by the 1,256 cc engine offered 48 hp (36 kW) gross at 5,400 rpm, or 39 hp (29 kW) net at 4,600 rpm. By 1977 only net horsepower ratings were offered, with power up to 31.7 kW (42.5 bhp) at 4,800 rpm. As for all three generations of HAs, the compression ratio remained 7.3 to 1. For the lighter duty HA 110 there was also an 'Economy' version, with a CD carburettor (constant depression), a redesigned manifold, and a different camshaft. This version offered up to 30% lower fuel consumption, although power did drop to 18 kW (24.4 bhp) at 3,800 rpm.

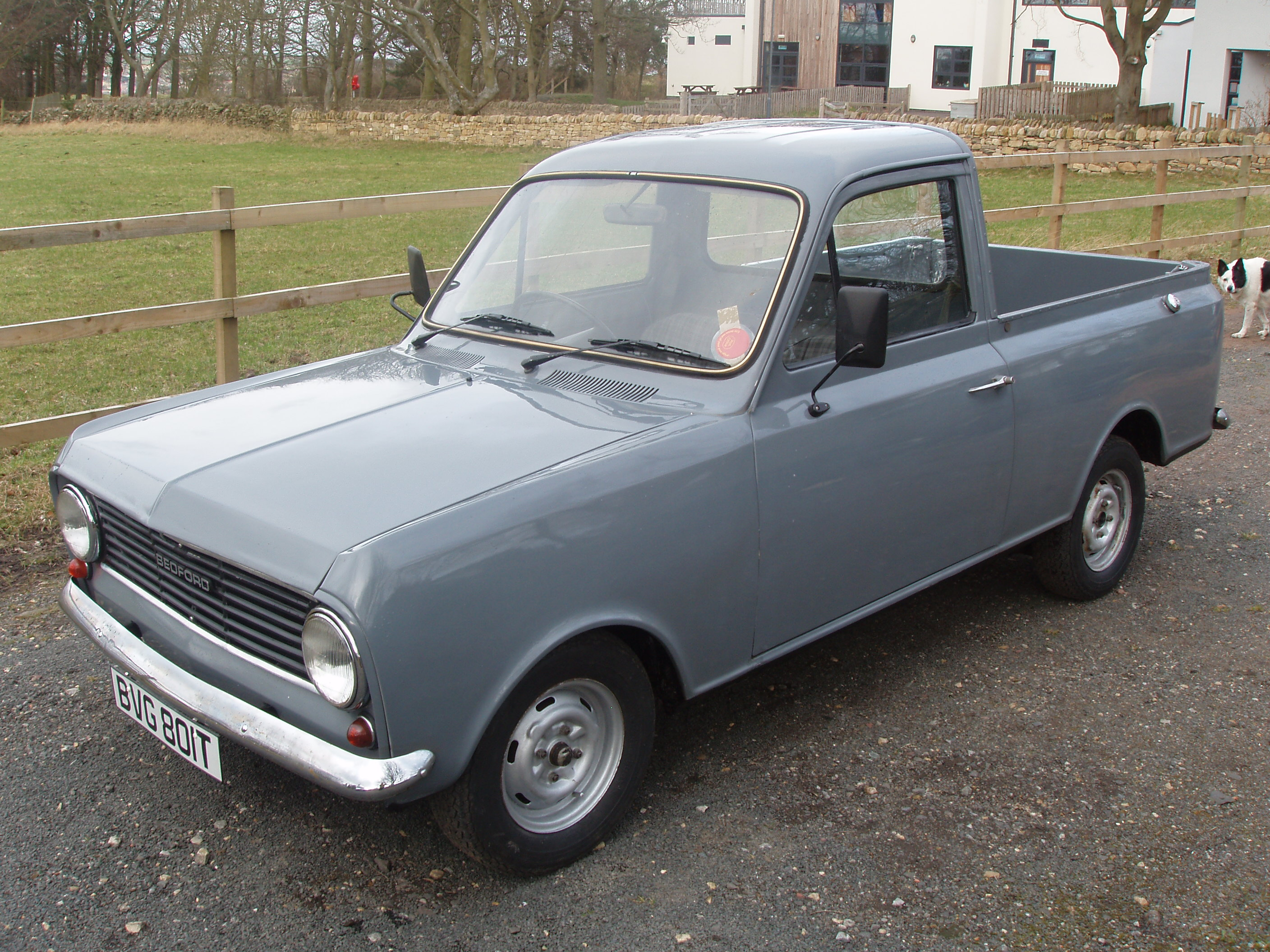
1978 Walker Bodies Bedford HA pick up

The HA continued on in production for nearly twenty years, until 1983. It was first supplanted by the short lived Vauxhall Chevette-based Bedford Chevanne 1976; the Chevanne was in turn replaced by the Opel-based Bedford Astravan / Bedford Astramax in September 1982. The HA continued to be available for another year as a simple, low-cost alternative with maximum interior space. Despite the fact that the Vauxhall Viva upon which it was based had gone through two further model generations, the bodywork of the HA van stayed the same until its eventual discontinuation in 1983, although it did receive some of the technical upgrades from the newer HB and HC Vivas. The 1,159 cc (70.7 cu in) engine arrived in 1967, followed by a 1,256 cc (76.6 cu in) in 1972. A pickup was also made by Martin Walter (Dormobile) - who also made the Beagle conversion - and by Walker Bodies of Watford. Made in very small numbers (believed to be around 60 in total) only a handful of these survive today: they were originally sold to companies and private buyers directly through Vauxhall/Bedford dealerships.

== The BTV ==
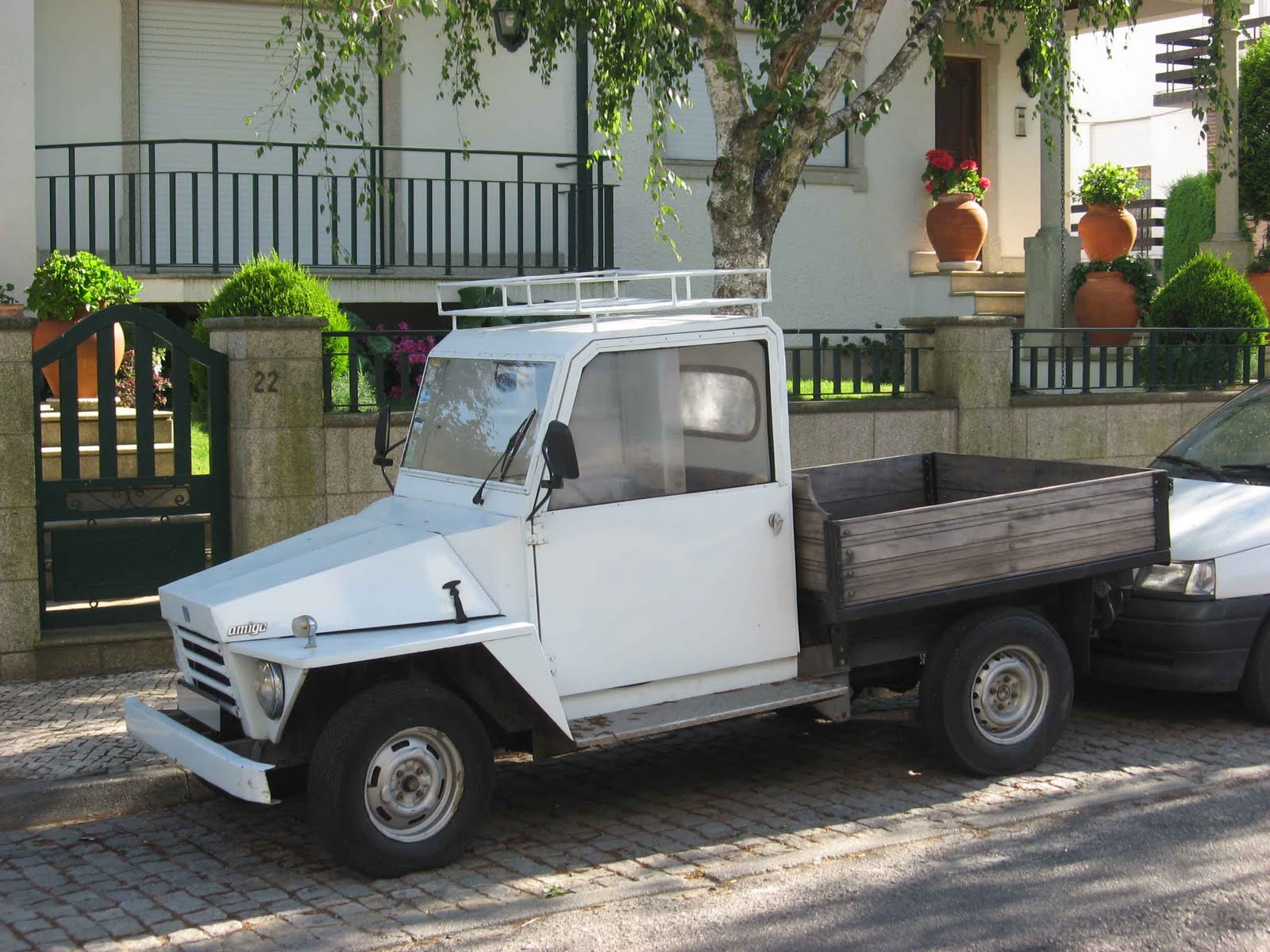
GM Amigo in Costa Rica

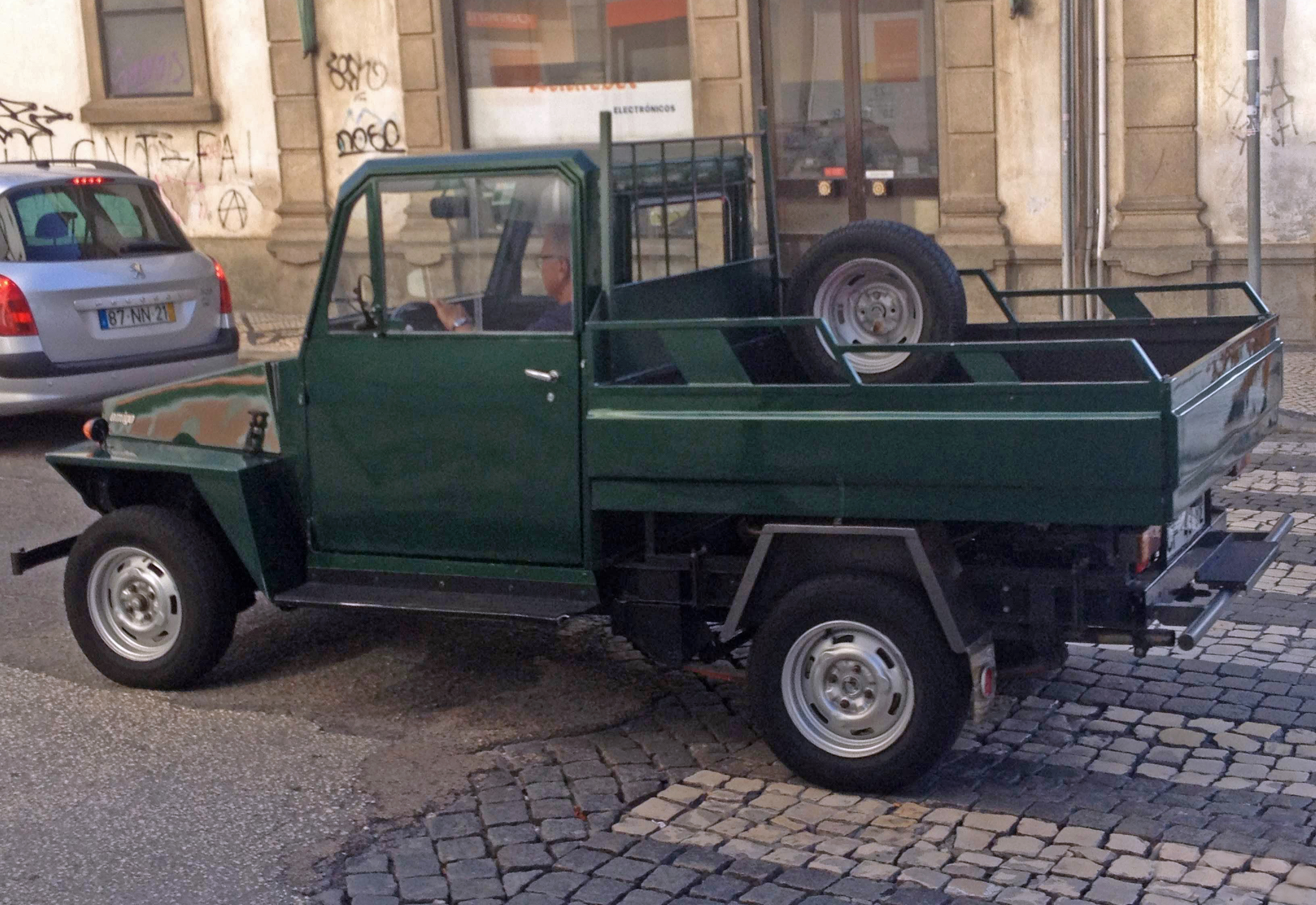
A GM Amigo in Portugal

In the early 1970s there were a number of basic utility vehicles developed for the developing world. Volkswagen (EA489), Citroën (FAF), and many others including General Motors tried to create cheap and basic transport which could be manufactured locally with a minimal up-front investment. GM's effort was developed by General Motors Overseas Operations (GMOO) and was called the "Basic Transportation Vehicle" (BTV). It was marketed under a variety of names depending on where it was built. The little truck has a simple body made up entirely of flat surfaces placed atop a basic frame, while most mechanicals and what interior there was derived from the HA. It also uses the HA's 1,256 cc low-compression engine, here with 37 hp (28 kW), which together with some of the other more complex elements was sent from Vauxhall's Luton plant. The BTV was at one time or another manufactured in Malaysia (as the Bedford Harimau, this was the first iteration to be manufactured, from May 1972), Costa Rica (Amigo), Ecuador (Andino), El Salvador (Cherito), Guatemala (Chato), Nicaragua (Pinolero, by INDEVESA, S.A.), Paraguay (GM Mitaí), the Philippines (Amigo or Tiger), Portugal (Amigo), Honduras (Compadre), and in Suriname as the Moetete 1200/1300. It was also available in Indonesia in 1977 and 1978, with slightly different bodywork, as the Morina (without a company name). While Vauxhalls were unusual in Indonesia, the Morina's engine had been used in the Holden Torana (LJ and TA series), which was popular as a taxi in Jakarta. The Morina was built by General Motors' local subsidiary P.T. Garuda Diesel, and power was claimed to be 58.5 hp (43.6 kW) SAE. "Morina" is an acronym of MObil Rakyat INdonesiA ("Indonesian People's Car").

The Ecuadorean Andino entered production in 1973 and continued until 1976. The Paraguayan Mitaí had its own bodywork which fully enveloped the front wheels, and was only available in red, white, or blue - the colours of their flag. Production was also planned for Singapore, Indonesia, Thailand, and certain other countries. Some sources state that no more than 3,000 BTVs were built across the world.

GM Philippines soon developed a more car-like version of the BTV with a four-door station wagon body (mainly used as a taxi) called the GM Harabas. General Motors also built another basic vehicle using the Vauxhall engine in the 1970s, the South African Chevrolet Nomad.
