= Institute for Affordable Transportation =

- Founded: Indianapolis, Indiana (2000)
- Type: Non-profit
- Location: Indianapolis, IN
- Key people: Will Austin, Founder / CEO
- Website: www.drivebuv.org

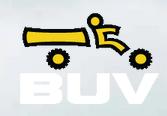
BUV Logo

The Institute of Affordable Transportation (IAT) is a missionary non-profit organization located in Indianapolis, Indiana, United States. The IAT provides low-cost transportation to people living in rural areas of developing countries, allowing them more mobility and economic opportunities. Their Basic Utility Vehicles (BUVs) can help with water and food delivery, assist with construction, and serve as community ambulances.

Will Austin, the Executive Director of IAT, began working full-time on the Basic Utility Vehicle (BUV) design in April 2000 and founded the Institute for Affordable Transportation as a public charity shortly thereafter. IAT is funded by individuals, foundations, churches and international corporations.

The IAT has enlisted educational institutions to help with the design and development of BUVs. It also runs an annual student design competition.
