= L. A. Ramdas =

Indian physicist and meteorologist

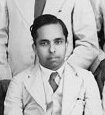
- Ramdas in 1929
- Born: June 3, 1900; Palghat, Kerala
- Died: January 1, 1979 (aged 78)

Lakshminarayanapuram Ananthakrishnan Ramdas (3 June 1900 – 1 January 1979) was an Indian physicist and meteorologist, known for discovering the atmospheric phenomenon of the Ramdas layer or Lifted Temperature Minimum where the lowest temperature in the atmosphere is not on the ground but a few tens of centimeters above the ground resulting. This can be seen in thin layer fogs which are at some height above the ground. He has been called the father of agricultural meteorology in India.

== Life ==
Ramdas was born in Palghat, Kerala and after his graduation he trained in physics and was a student of C. V. Raman as Palit Research Scholar from 1923 to 1926. He worked on light scattering and recorded what is now called the "Raman effect". He received a Ph.D. from the Calcutta University and joined the Indian Meteorological Department on September 15, 1926, at Simla. He also briefly studied thin-films and in 1927 he boldly suggested that the observed decline in rainfall over half a century may have been due to reduced evaporation caused by a thin layer of oil on the seas due to anthropogenic activity. When a separate division of agricultural meteorology was started in Pune he was placed in charge of it on August 22, 1932. This become a directorate in 1946 and he served as director. In 1953 he became a deputy director-general of observatories and retired in 1956. He subsequently joined the National Physical Laboratory at New Delhi and was an emeritus professor in 1965.

His major work was on agricultural meteorology and began a project on "Weather in relation to crops" which was to become the "Agri Met" division of the IMD, among the earliest groups in the world to have such a specialization. As part of this work, he started looking at climate phenomena near the ground. Ramdas devised a system of measuring effective rainfall that included a rain-gauge held below a layer of soil and plants that simulated the land. He has been called the father of agricultural meteorology in India. Among his contributions were crop weather calendars which examined detrimental weather in the phases of crop growth in the various agro-climatic regions of India. He also studied microclimate in crop ecosystems, pest and disease relationships with weather apart from soil-water relationships. He served on the Commission on Agricultural Meteorology of the World Meteorological Organization.

Ramdas was a Fellow (since 1935) of the National Institute of Sciences of India (which became Indian National Science Academy in 1970). He also served as President of the Physics Section of the Indian Science Congress. He received the Padma Shri Award in 1958. He received the title of the Member of the Order of the British Empire (MBE) in 1945.

L.A. Ramdas died on January 1, 1979.

=== Discovery of Lifted Minimum Temperature ===
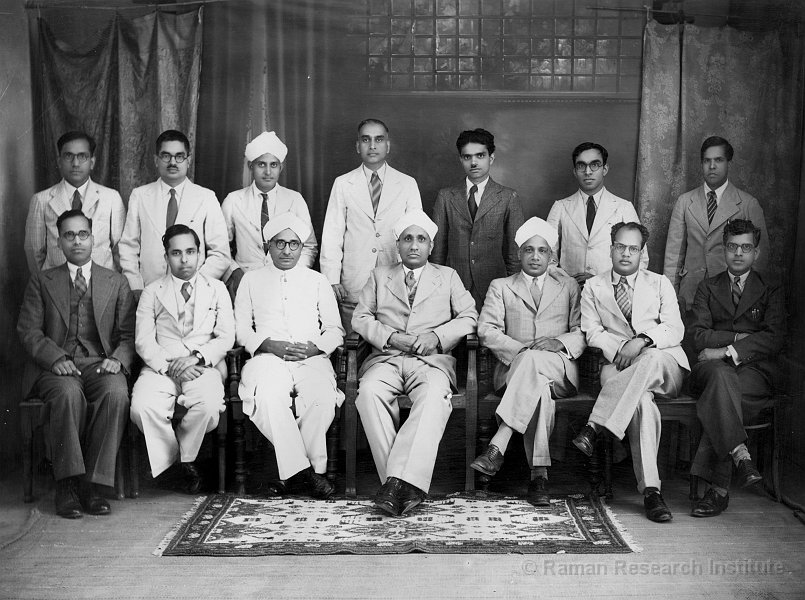
Ramdas seated second from left with C.V. Raman and others, c. 1929

At the time, it was believed that the temperature at night is lowest at the ground and increases with altitude. These were based on meteorological observations that started taking temperature measurements of the atmosphere starting at a height (called the screen height) of 1.2m from the ground.

Ramdas however, conducted such measurements at a number of points closer to the ground. Observations conducted at Pune, Agra, Madras and Bhadrachalam all indicated that on clear windless nights, the minimum temperature is not on the ground but is lifted by a distance between 20 and 50 cm.

The phenomenon was first reported in a 1932 paper by Ramdas and S. Atmanathan in the journal Beiträge zur Geophysik. Initially, these observations were doubted but they have been replicated widely in subsequent decades by others. The phenomenon has been named the Ramdas Layer, and is attributed to the interaction of thermal radiation effects on atmospheric aerosols and convection transfer close to the ground.
