= Morinda (disambiguation) =

Morinda is a genus of flowering plants.

Morinda may also refer to:

- Morinda, Punjab, a town in the Rupnagar District in the Indian state of Punjab
- Morinda, Inc., a multi-level marketing company

== See also ==
- Moringa, a genus of flowering plants
