= Africar =

British automobile manufacturer

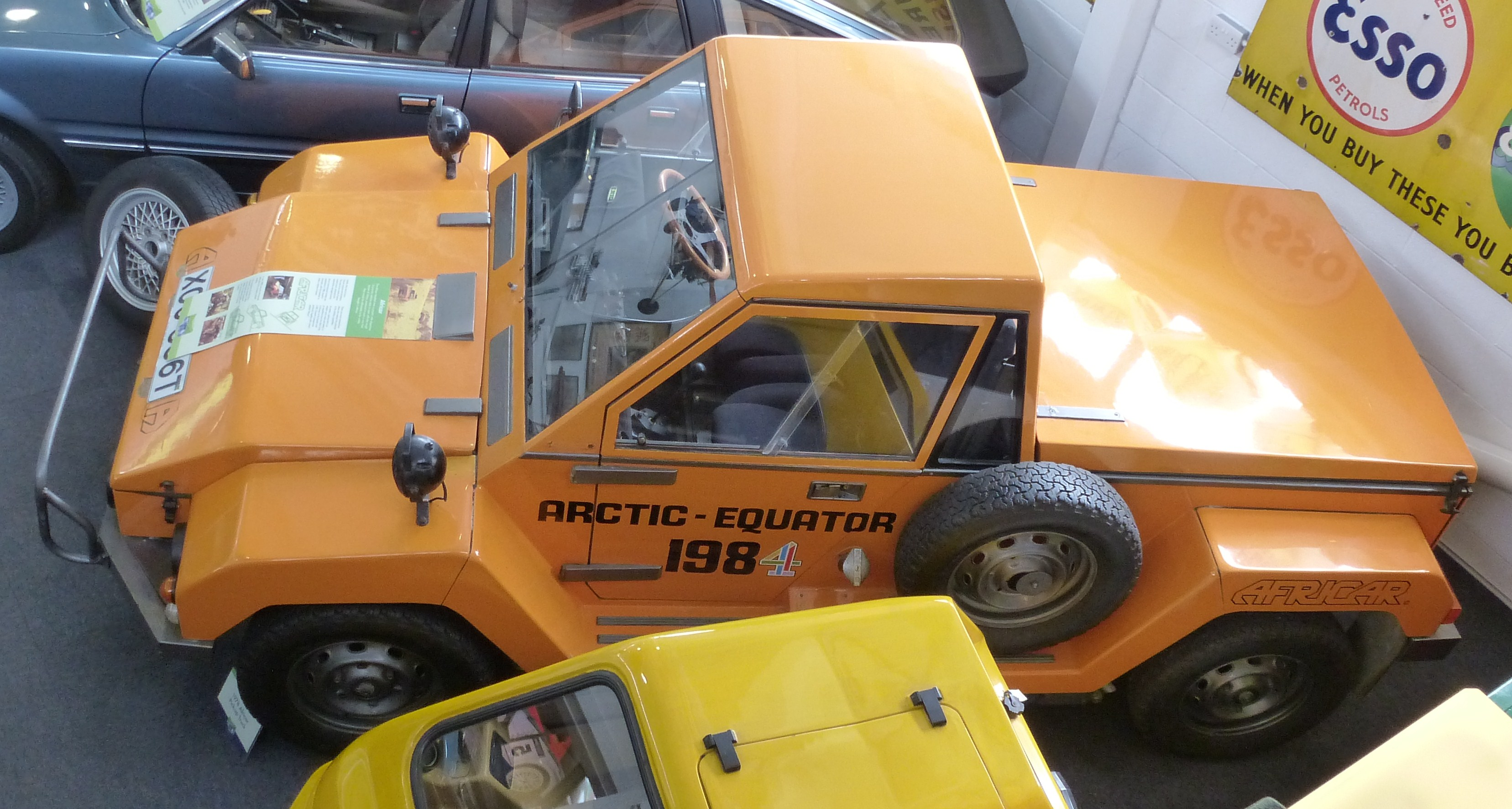
Africar

The Africar project set out to provide vehicles able to cope well with the rough terrain of Africa, but also cheap enough to be bought widely in Africa.

== Design ==
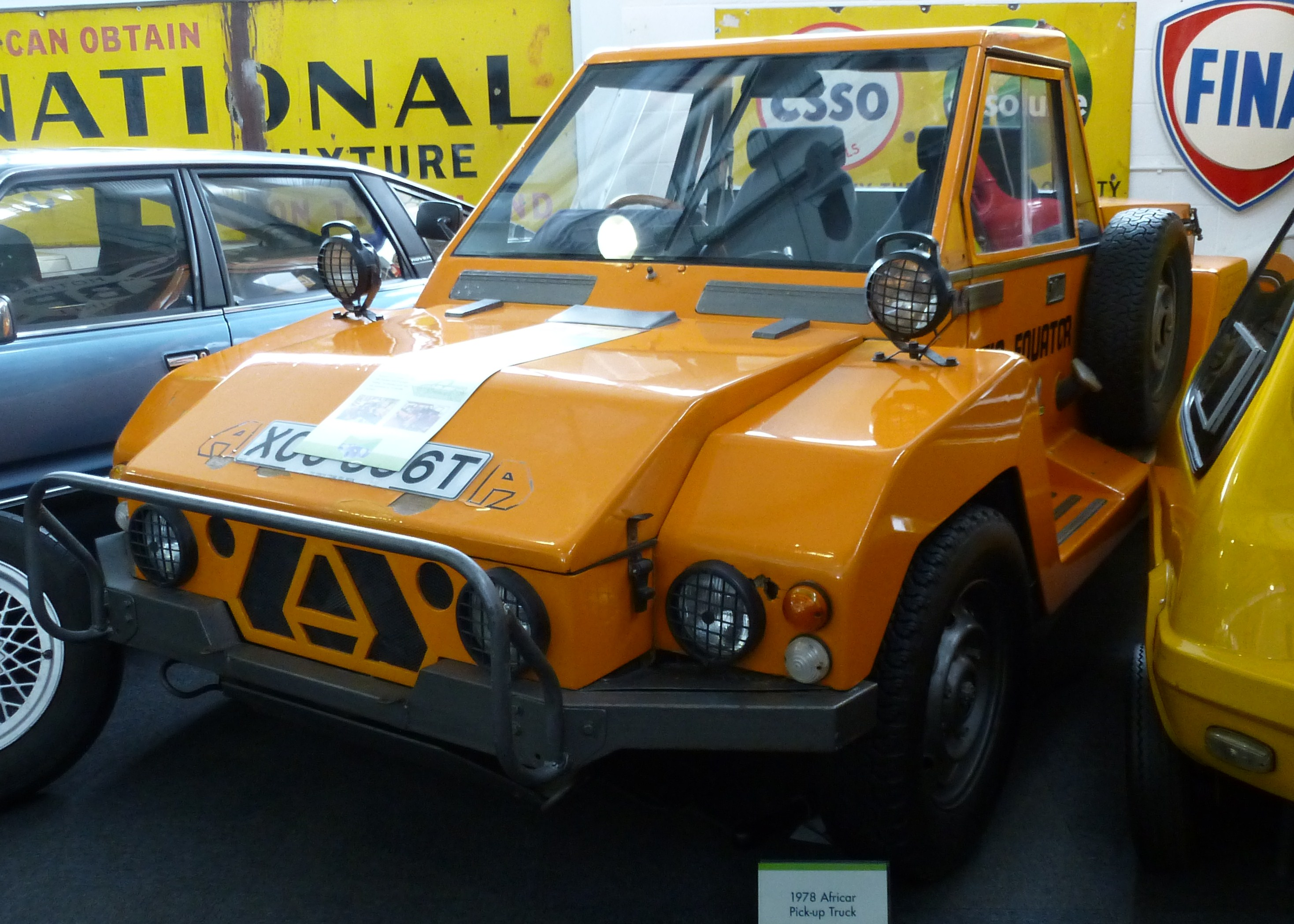

They were initially to have Citroën engines and drivetrains, until such time as Africar's own engine and drive train was fully developed. The bodywork was to be made of epoxy-coated wood – the 'West' system used in the construction of some yachts – which could be repaired with locally available labour and materials. The wood for building the cars was to be obtained from sustainably managed forests.

== Production ==
A company, Africar International Limited, was set up in 1986 to make and sell the vehicles. Based in Lancaster, England, it intended to offer a variety of vehicles, ranging from a four-wheel drive car to an eight-wheel-drive panel truck. There was considerable interest in the vehicles and their potential, both from firms who saw the commercial possibilities of the project, and from users who appreciated the vehicles' capabilities. Only 6 Africars ever made it into production.

== Promotion ==
Three versions were actually completed, an estate car, a pickup and a six-wheeler and these were tested in 1984 on an expedition from the Arctic Circle in Norway to the equator. A Channel 4 television programme was made of this. There was also a book, entitled "Africar" to accompany the series.

== Failure ==
The project floundered because of financial difficulties, and in July 1988 the company ceased trading.

== Legacy ==
The car was never properly tested by market forces but interest, even in the UK, demonstrated that it was an attractive, capable vehicle.

== Founder's fate ==
The company's founder and sometime owner, Tony Howarth, was arrested in 1994 and charged with fraudulent trading and obtaining property by deception. He pleaded guilty and was sentenced to 15 months' imprisonment. The project briefly resurfaced as the Bedouin.

== See also ==
- Baby-Brousse
- Global Vehicle Trust
- List of car manufacturers of the United Kingdom

== Bibliography ==
- Howarth, Anthony (1987). Africar: the Development of a Car for Africa. Channel 4 / The Ordinary Road. ISBN 1870427009.
