= Outside air temperature =

Aviation term

In aviation terminology, the outside air temperature (OAT) or static air temperature (SAT) refers to the temperature of the air around an aircraft, but unaffected by the passage of the aircraft through it.

== Aviation usage ==
The outside air temperature is used in many calculations pertaining to flight planning, some of them being takeoff performance, density altitude, cruise performance and go-around performance. In most texts, the abbreviation, "OAT" is used.

=== Units ===
Most performance and flight planning graphs and tables use either degrees Celsius or Fahrenheit or both. The Kelvin scale, however, is used for Mach number calculations. For example, the speed of sound in dry air is

$${c}= 38.945 \sqrt{K},$$

where:

$c$ is the speed of sound in knots,
$K$ is the outside air temperature in kelvins.

=== Sources ===
Outside air temperature can be obtained from the aviation meteorological services, on the ATIS or measured by a probe on the aircraft. When measured by the airplane's probe in flight, it may have to be corrected for adiabatic (ram effect) rise and friction, particularly in high-performance aircraft. Therefore, the outside air temperature is usually calculated from the total air temperature.

ATIS temperature represents the temperature at the elevation of the ATIS reporting station, i.e., the surface elevation.

== See also ==
- Acronyms and abbreviations in avionics
- Hot and high
