= Total air temperature =

Fluid flow temperature in aviation

In aviation, stagnation temperature is known as total air temperature and is measured by a temperature probe mounted on the surface of the aircraft. The probe is designed to bring the air to rest relative to the aircraft. As the air is brought to rest, kinetic energy is converted to internal energy. The air is compressed and experiences an adiabatic increase in temperature. Therefore, total air temperature is higher than the static (or ambient) air temperature.

Total air temperature is an essential input to an air data computer in order to enable the computation of static air temperature and hence true airspeed.

The relationship between static and total air temperatures is given by: $\frac{T_\mathrm{total}}{T_{s}} = {1+\frac{\gamma -1}{2}M_a^2}$ where:

- $T_{s}=$ static air temperature, SAT (kelvins or degrees Rankine)
- $T_\mathrm{total}=$ total air temperature, TAT (kelvins or degrees Rankine)
- $M_{a}=$ Mach number
- $\gamma\ =\,$ ratio of specific heats, approx 1.400 for dry air

In practice, the total air temperature probe will not perfectly recover the energy of the airflow, and the temperature rise may not be entirely due to adiabatic process. In this case, an empirical recovery factor (less than 1) may be introduced to compensate:

$\frac{T_\mathrm{total}}{T_{s}}={1+\frac{\gamma -1}{2}eM_a^2}$	1

where e is the recovery factor (also noted C_{t})

Typical recovery factors

Platinum wire ratiometer thermometer ("flush bulb type"): e ≈ 0.75 − 0.9

Double platinum tube ratiometer thermometer ("TAT probe"): e ≈ 1

Other notations

Total air temperature (TAT) is also called: indicated air temperature (IAT) or ram air temperature (RAT)
Static air temperature (SAT) is also called: outside air temperature (OAT) or true air temperature

== Ram rise ==
The difference between TAT and SAT is called ram rise (RR) and is caused by compressibility and friction of the air at high velocities.

$RR_\mathrm{total}=TAT-SAT$	2

In practice the ram rise is negligible for aircraft flying at (true) airspeeds under Mach 0.2. For airspeeds (TAS) over Mach 0.2, as airspeed increases the temperature exceeds that of still air. This is caused by a combination of kinetic (friction) heating and adiabatic compression.

- Kinetic heating. As the airspeed increases, more and more molecules of air per second hit the aircraft. This causes a temperature rise in the Direct Reading thermometer probe of the aircraft due to friction. Because the airflow is thought to be compressible and isentropic, which, by definition, is adiabatic and reversible, the equations used in this article do not take account of friction heating. This is why the calculation of static air temperature requires the use of the recovery factor, ${e}$. Kinetic heating for modern passenger jets is almost negligible.
- Adiabatic compression. As described above, this is caused by a conversion of energy and not by direct application of heat. At airspeeds over Mach 0.2, in the Remote Reading temperature probe (TAT-probe), the outside airflow, which may be several hundred knots, is brought virtually to rest very rapidly. The energy (Specific Kinetic Energy) of the moving air is then released (converted) in the form of a temperature rise (Specific Enthalpy). Energy cannot be destroyed but only transformed; this means that according to the first law of thermodynamics, the total energy of an isolated system must remain constant.

The total of kinetic heating and adiabatic temperature change (caused by adiabatic compression) is the Total Ram Rise.

Combining equations (1) & (2), we get: $RR_\mathrm{total}={T_s\frac{\gamma -1}{2}eM_a^2}$

If we use the Mach number equation for dry air: $M_a = {\frac{V}{a}}$ where $a={\sqrt{\gamma R_{sp} T_s}}$, we get

$RR_\mathrm{total}={e V^2 \frac{\gamma -1}{\gamma2R_{sp} }}$	3

Which can be simplified to:

$RR_\text{total} = {\frac{V^2}{2 C_p}} e$

by using $R_{sp} = { C_p - C_v }$ and

- $\gamma = {\frac{ C_p}{C_v}}$
- $a =$ local speed of sound.
- $\gamma =$ adiabatic index (ratio of heat capacities) and is assumed for aviation purposes to be 7/5 = 1.400.
- $R_{sp} =$ specific gas constant. The approximate value of $R_{sp}$ for dry air is 286.9 J·kg−1·K−1.
- $C_p =$ heat capacity constant for constant pressure.
- $C_v =$ heat capacity constant for constant volume.
- $T_s =$ static air temperature, SAT, measured in kelvins.
- $V =$ true airspeed of the aircraft, TAS.
- $e =$ recovery factor, which has an approximate value of 0.98, typical for a modern TAT-probe.

By solving (3) for the above values with TAS in knots, a simple accurate formula for ram rise is then: $RR_\mathrm{total}=\frac{V^2}{87^2}$

== See also ==
- Stagnation point
- Stagnation temperature
- Outside air temperature
- Mach number
- Speed of sound
- Adiabatic process
- Isentropic process
- Specific enthalpy
