= List of automobile manufacturers of Australia =

The following is a list of automobile manufacturers of Australia.

== Current manufacturers ==
- ACE EV Group (2017–present)
- AUSLEY AUTOMOTIVE (2019–present)
- Bolwell (1962–present)
- Borland Racing Developments (1984–present)
- Devaux Cars (2001–present)
- H2X Australia
- Jacer (1995–present)
- Minetti Sports Cars (2003–present)
- Python (1981–present)
- Quantum (2015–present)
- Roaring Forties (1997–present)
- Spartan-V (2004–present)
- Stohr Cars (1991–present)
- Kenworth (Trucks)

== Former manufacturers ==
- A.Nielsen Coach Factory (1893–1923)
- Arcadipane (1977–1979)
- Ascort (1958–1960)
- Austin (1954–1983)
- Australian Motor Industries (AMI) (1926–1987)
- Australian Six (1919–1930)
- Australis (1897–1907)
- Birchfield (2003–2004)
- Blade (2008–2013)
- Bolwell (1962–1979)
- Brabham Automotive (2018–2024)
- Buchanan
- Buckle (1955–1959)
- Bullet (1996–2009)
- Bush Ranger (2006–2016)
- Caldwell Vale (1907–1913)
- Campbell Motorcycles/Cars (1904–1925)
- Cheetah
- Chic (1923–1929)
- Chrysler (1957–1981)
- Datsun (Nissan brand) (1966–1983)
- Finlayson Bros & Co. Pty Ltd (1900–1904)
- Ford (1925–2016)
- Ford Performance Vehicles (FPV) (2002–2014)
- Giocattolo (1986–1989)
- Goggomobil (1958–1961)
- Hartnett (1949–1955)
- Haines & Grut Motor Buggy Co. Pty Ltd (1908–1909)
- Hillman (1946-1972)
- Holden (1948–2017)
- Holden Special Vehicles (HSV) (1987–2017)
- Ilinga
- Kaditcha
- Leyland (1973–1982)
- Lewis Cycle & Motor Works (1899–1901)
- Lightburn & Co (1963–1965)
- Lincoln Motor Car Co (1918–1926)
- Lloyd-Hartnett (1957–1962)
- Mercedes-Benz (1890–1965)
- Mitsubishi (1980–2008)
- Morris (1947–1973)
- Nissan (1983–1992)
- Nota (1955–2002)
- Palm (1917–1921)
- Pellandini (1970–1978)
- PRB (1978–2018)
- Puma Clubman (1998–2016)
- Purvis Eureka (1974–1991)
- Shearer (1885–1896)
- Shrike (1988–1989)
- Southern Cross (1931–1935)
- Statesman (1971–1984)
- Tarrant (1900–1907)
- Thomson Motor Co (1896–1901)
- Toyota (1963–2017)
- Volkswagen (1954-1977)

=== Manufacturers who have stopped trading ===
The following manufacturers have stopped trading, however no publicly verifiable instances of their cessation date is easily accessible.

- Alpha Sports (1963–?)
- Austral Cycle & Motor Works (1913–?)
- Bowker (1942–?)
- Daytona (2002–?)
- Elfin Cars (1958–?)
- Highland (1897–2022)
- Innes (1904–?)
- J.A.C. Ziegler (1898–?)
- Joss Developments (2004–?)
- Knowles Automobile and Motor Power Co. (1903–?)
- Pioneer, Australian Horseless Carriage Syndicate (1897–?)
- Puckridge (1904–?)
- Redback (2006–?)
- Spartan Motor Company (2010–?)

== See also ==
- Automotive industry in Australia
- List of car manufacturers

== Sources ==
National motor museum

- Hreblay, Marian Suman, Automobile Manufacturers Worldwide Registry, ISBN 9780786409723
