= Automotive industry in Australia =

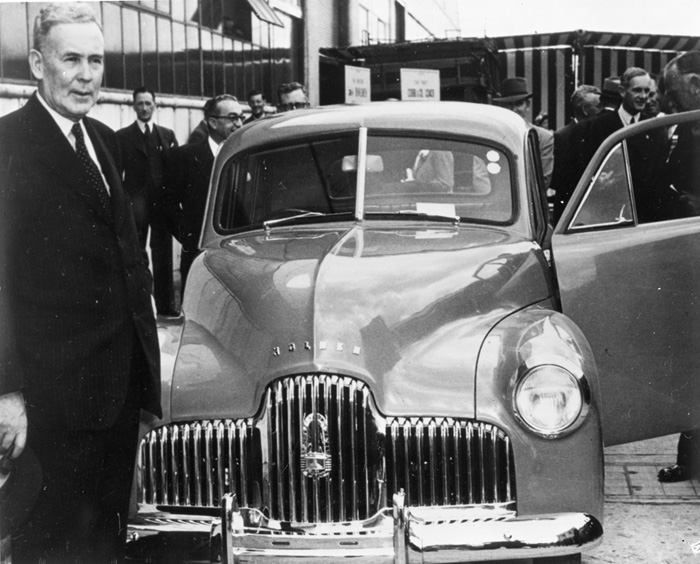
Labor PM Ben Chifley at the launching of the Holden 48-215 on 29 November 1948

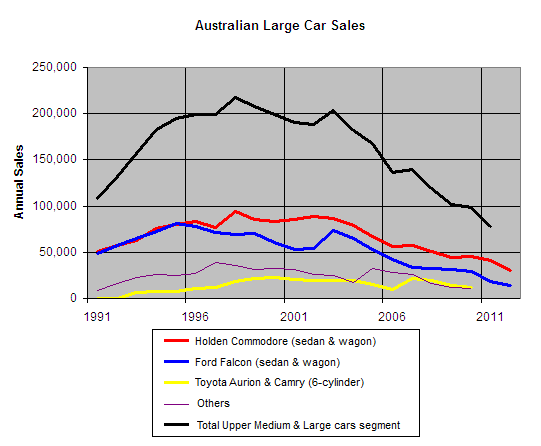
Graph of large car sales in Australia since 1991

A substantial car industry was created in Australia in the 20th century through the opening of Australian plants by international manufacturers. The first major carmaker was Ford Australia and the first Australian-designed mass production car was manufactured by Holden in 1948. Australian manufacture of cars rose to a maximum of almost half a million in the 1970s (10th place in the World) and still exceeded 400,000 in 2004. Australia was best known for the design and production of 'large' sized passenger vehicles. By 2009 total production had fallen to around 175,000 and the Australian market was dominated by cars imported from Asia and Europe.

As of 2015, Australian-designed cars were manufactured by General Motors subsidiary Holden, and Ford Australia, while Toyota Australia manufactured local variants of its international models, particularly the Camry. However, the Ford Australia engine and vehicle plants closed in October 2016 and the Holden and Toyota Australia factories closed in late 2017. Only Ford's design and development facilities remain in operation, leaving Australia as one of 13 countries with the capabilities to design and develop mass market cars from scratch. As of 2020, Holden has been shuttered and will no longer be sold as a GM brand.

The Federal Chamber of Automotive Industries (FCAI) is the peak representative organisation for car manufacturing companies. It is Australia's "biggest car manufacturer lobby group" according to ABC News.

== History ==
Monthly domestic sales of new motor vehicles

Monthly value of motor vehicle exports since 1988 ($millions)

The value of monthly vehicle imports ($millions) since 1988

Transportation and special purpose vehicles

Passenger vehicles

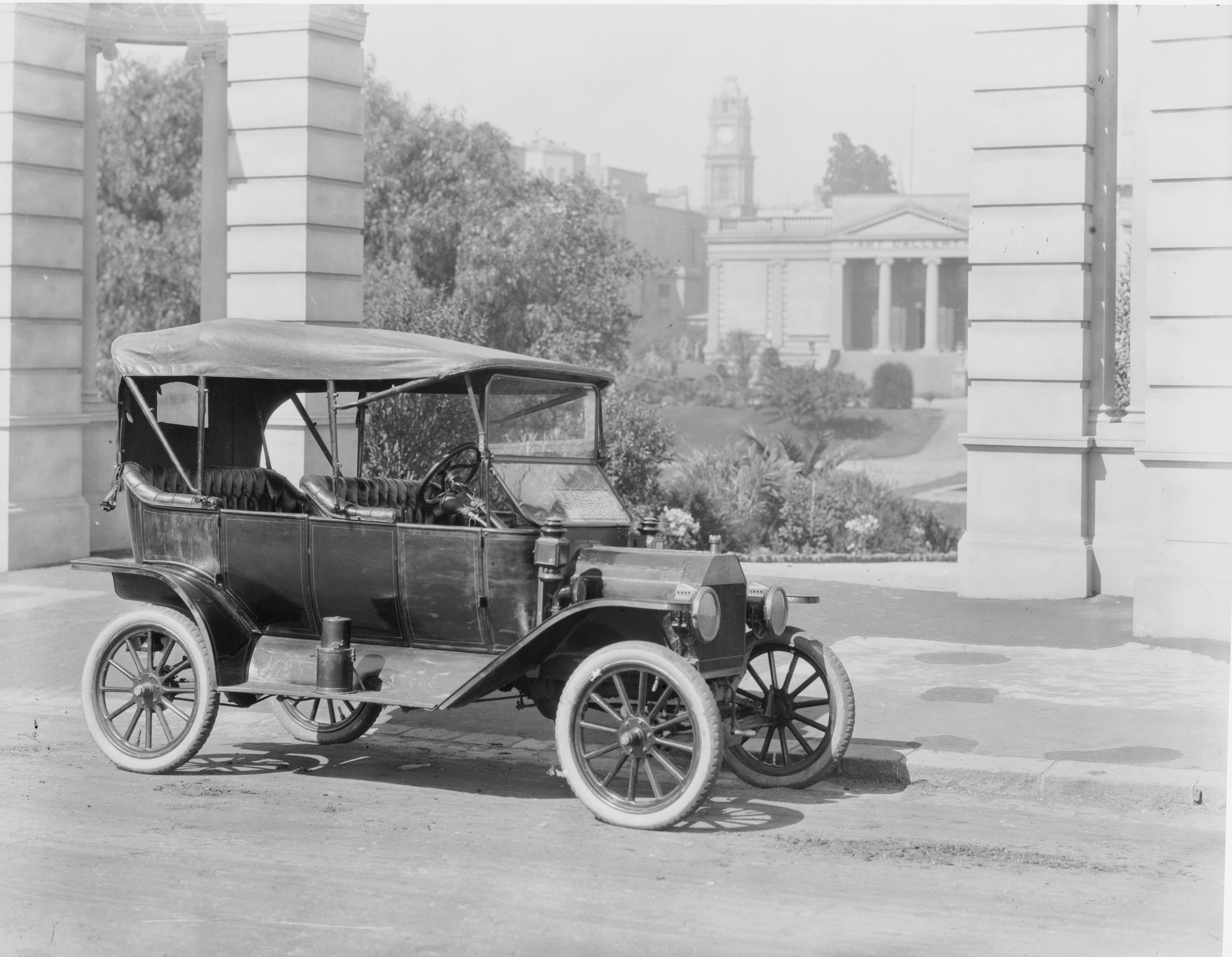
Ford Model T parked outside the Geelong Library at its launch in Australia in 1925

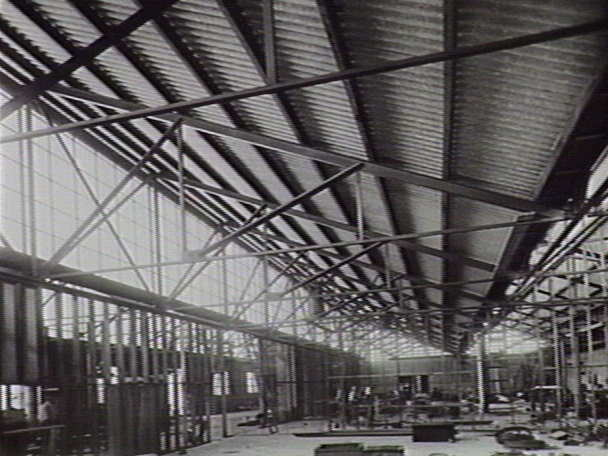
Ford Australia plant under construction in Geelong in 1926

Australian constructors were very active at the very beginning of both car and aircraft development and in some areas, ahead of their overseas counterparts. Due to the isolation of Australia, it was more practical for Australia to make its own cars. The first imported car in Australia is believed to be the Pender-Hertel of 1897.

The Highland was one of the first types of automobiles to be offered for sale in Australia, firstly in 1894 as a primitive motorised tricycle, then two years later as a four-wheeled, two-seater vehicle using bicycle components.

The first true cars made in Australia were steam cars. The first of these steam cars, the Phaeton, was made in 1896 by Herbert Thomson and Edward Holmes of Armadale, Melbourne. It was exhibited in 1900 using the first pneumatic tyres made in Australia by Dunlop. The 5 horsepower single cylinder steam carriage which is now in the Institute of Applied Sciences, Melbourne, was reliable and durable enough to take Thomson and a friend 493 miles from Bathurst to Melbourne at an average speed of 8.7 mp/h.

In 1900 Bruno Hammer built a one off automobile in Mount Torrens, South Australia.

In 1901 Harley Tarrant produced the first Tarrant automobile, which was the first petrol-driven car built entirely in Australia in a small workshop in Melbourne. Before that, Tarrant had been using the shop to build engines. Tarrant was joined in this endeavour by bicycle maker, Howard Lewis. The car was powered by a rear-mounted 6 hp Benz engine. This car was followed by many improved designs, including the first fully enclosed car body made in Australia. Later models included locally produced components including: engines, gearboxes and rear axles. The sole surviving Tarrant is on display at the RACV City Club, on the chancery level.

In 1903, the Australian Motoring Association was formed in New South Wales, South Australia and Victoria to protect the interests of motorists. In 1924, this was followed by the Australian Automobile Association.

In 1917 the vehicle bodies were required to be made in Australia.

On 31 March 1925, Ford announced that its Australian headquarters were to be at Geelong, Victoria. The first Australian-built Ford was a Model T launched in June 1925.

Tyre manufacturing also existed in Australia. However, the last tyre factory closed in April 2010 when Bridgestone ceased production in their facility in Salisbury, South Australia.

== Historical data ==
=== Historical production ===
Year	Production	0	100	200	300	400
1950	58,000					
1960	204,000					
1970	475,000					
1980	361,000					
2000	347,122					
2005	388,985					
2006	326,000					
2007	334,772					
2008	324,118					
2009	223,354					
2010	239,443					
2011	219,376					
2012	221,224					
2013	210,538					
2014	174,986					
2015	167,538					
2016						

Source:, OICA

=== Historical sales ===
Top 10 best-selling models in Australia (new passenger and commercial vehicles), 1977–2025 Source : BSCB Table indicators Light (B) Car Small (C) / Medium (D) Car Large (E) / Sports (S) Car Coupé utility / Pickup Crossover / SUV (J) X ^{L} Locally developed / manufactured / assembled / badged
Year	Models and Ranking									
Year	1st	2nd	3rd	4th	5th	6th	7th	8th	9th	10th
1977	Ford Falcon ^{L}	Holden Kingswood ^{L}	Holden Torana/Sunbird ^{L}	Datsun 180B/200B	Toyota Corona/Celica ^{L}	not available				
1978	Holden Kingswood ^{L}	Ford Falcon ^{L}	Holden Torana/Sunbird ^{L}	Chrysler Sigma ^{L}	Ford Cortina ^{L}	Datsun 200B ^{L}	Toyota Corona/Celica ^{L}	Toyota Corolla ^{L}	Datsun 120Y ^{L}	not available
1979	Holden Commodore ^{L}	not available								
1980	Holden Commodore ^{L}	not available								
1981	Holden Commodore ^{L}	not available								
1982	Ford Falcon ^{L}	Holden Commodore ^{L}	Mitsubishi Sigma ^{L}	Ford Laser ^{L}	Nissan Skyline	Holden Gemini ^{L}	Toyota Corolla ^{L}	Holden Camira ^{L}	Toyota Corona ^{L}	not available
1983	Ford Falcon ^{L}	Holden Commodore ^{L}	Holden Camira ^{L}	Mitsubishi Sigma ^{L}	Ford Laser ^{L}	not available				
1984	Ford Falcon ^{L}	Holden Commodore ^{L}	Ford Laser ^{L}	Toyota Corona ^{L}	Ford Telstar ^{L}	not available	Holden Camira ^{L}	not available		
1985	Ford Falcon ^{L}	Holden Commodore ^{L}	Ford Laser ^{L}	Toyota Corolla ^{L}	Mitsubishi Magna ^{L}	not available				
1986	Ford Falcon ^{L}	Holden Commodore ^{L}	Ford Laser ^{L}	Mitsubishi Magna ^{L}	Toyota Corolla ^{L}	not available				
1987	Ford Falcon ^{L}	Holden Commodore ^{L}	Mitsubishi Magna ^{L}	Ford Laser ^{L}	Toyota Camry/Corona ^{L}	Toyota Corolla ^{L}	Nissan Pintara/Skyline ^{L}	not available		
1988	Ford Falcon ^{L}	Holden Commodore ^{L}	Mitsubishi Magna ^{L}	Toyota Camry ^{L}	not available		Nissan Pulsar ^{L}	not available		
1989	Holden Commodore ^{L}	Ford Falcon ^{L}	Mitsubishi Magna ^{L}	Ford Laser ^{L}	Toyota Camry ^{L}	Toyota Corolla ^{L}	not available			
1990	Holden Commodore ^{L}	Ford Falcon ^{L}	Ford Laser ^{L}	Mitsubishi Magna ^{L}	Toyota Camry ^{L}	not available				
1991	Holden Commodore ^{L}	Ford Falcon ^{L}	Ford Laser ^{L}	Toyota Camry ^{L}	Mitsubishi Magna ^{L}	not available				
1992	Ford Falcon ^{L}	Holden Commodore ^{L}	Mitsubishi Magna/Verada ^{L}	Toyota Camry ^{L}	Toyota Corolla ^{L}	Ford Laser ^{L}	Nissan Pulsar ^{L}	Toyota HiLux	Mazda 626	not available
1993	Ford Falcon ^{L}	Holden Commodore ^{L}	Mitsubishi Magna/Verada ^{L}	Toyota Camry/Vienta ^{L}	Toyota Corolla ^{L}	Toyota HiLux	Ford Laser ^{L}	not available		Hyundai Excel
1994	Holden Commodore ^{L}	Ford Falcon ^{L}	Mitsubishi Magna/Verada ^{L}	Toyota Camry/Vienta ^{L}	Toyota Corolla ^{L}	Toyota HiLux	Hyundai Excel	not available		
1995	Ford Falcon ^{L}	Holden Commodore ^{L}	Toyota Camry/Vienta ^{L}	Mitsubishi Magna/Verada ^{L}	Hyundai Excel	not available		Ford Festiva ^{L}	not available	
1996	Holden Commodore ^{L}	Ford Falcon ^{L}	Hyundai Excel	not available						Daewoo 1.5i/Cielo
1997	Holden Commodore ^{L}	Ford Falcon ^{L}	Mitsubishi Magna/Verada ^{L}	Hyundai Excel	not available				Nissan Pulsar	not available
1998	Holden Commodore ^{L}	Ford Falcon ^{L}	Hyundai Excel	Toyota Camry/Vienta ^{L}	not available					Mitsubishi Lancer
1999	Holden Commodore ^{L}	Ford Falcon ^{L}	Toyota Camry/Vienta ^{L}	Hyundai Excel	Toyota Corolla ^{L}	Mitsubishi Magna/Verada ^{L}	Nissan Pulsar	not available	Holden Rodeo ^{L}	not available
2000	Holden Commodore ^{L}	Ford Falcon ^{L}	Toyota Camry/Vienta ^{L}	Toyota Corolla	Hyundai Excel/Accent	not available			Mitsubishi Lancer	Holden Astra ^{L}
2001	Holden Commodore ^{L}	Ford Falcon ^{L}	Toyota Corolla ^{L}	Holden Astra ^{L}	Toyota Camry/Vienta ^{L}	Mitsubishi Magna/Verada ^{L}	Hyundai Accent/Excel	not available		
2002	Holden Commodore ^{L}	Ford Falcon ^{L}	Toyota Corolla	Toyota Camry ^{L}	Holden Astra ^{L}	Mitsubishi Magna/Verada ^{L}	Toyota HiLux	not available		
2003	Holden Commodore ^{L}	Ford Falcon ^{L}	Toyota Camry ^{L}	Toyota Corolla	Holden Astra ^{L}	Toyota HiLux	Mitsubishi Magna/Verada ^{L}	Mazda 323	Ford Falcon Ute ^{L}	Holden Rodeo ^{L}
2004	Holden Commodore ^{L}	Ford Falcon ^{L}	Toyota Camry ^{L}	Toyota Corolla	Toyota HiLux	Holden Astra ^{L}	Holden Rodeo ^{L}	Holden Commodore Ute ^{L}	Mazda3	Ford Falcon Ute ^{L}
2005	Holden Commodore ^{L}	Ford Falcon ^{L}	Toyota Corolla	Toyota Camry ^{L}	Holden Astra ^{L}	Mazda3	Toyota HiLux	not available	Ford Territory ^{L}	not available
2006	Holden Commodore ^{L}	Toyota Corolla	Ford Falcon ^{L}	Toyota HiLux	Mazda3	Toyota Camry ^{L}	Toyota Yaris	not available		
2007	Holden Commodore ^{L}	Toyota Corolla	Toyota HiLux	Mazda3	Ford Falcon ^{L}	Toyota Yaris	not available	Toyota Aurion ^{L}	Mitsubishi Lancer	not available
2008	Holden Commodore ^{L}	Toyota Corolla	Toyota HiLux	Mazda3	Ford Falcon ^{L}	Toyota Yaris	Toyota Camry ^{L}	Mitsubishi Lancer	Toyota Aurion	Nissan Navara
2009	Holden Commodore ^{L}	Toyota Corolla	Toyota HiLux	Mazda3	Ford Falcon ^{L}	Hyundai i30	Mitsubishi Lancer	Toyota Camry ^{L}	Hyundai Getz	Toyota Yaris
2010	Holden Commodore ^{L}	Toyota Corolla	Toyota HiLux	Mazda3	Hyundai i30	Ford Falcon ^{L}	Holden Cruze ^{L}	Toyota Camry ^{L}	Mitsubishi Lancer	Hyundai Getz
2011	Mazda3	Holden Commodore ^{L}	Toyota HiLux	Toyota Corolla	Holden Cruze ^{L}	Hyundai i30	Nissan Navara	Toyota Camry ^{L}	Ford Falcon ^{L}	Mitsubishi Lancer
2012	Mazda3	Toyota HiLux	Toyota Corolla	Holden Commodore ^{L}	Holden Cruze ^{L}	Hyundai i30	Toyota Camry ^{L}	Nissan Navara	Toyota Yaris	Ford Focus ^{L}
2013	Toyota Corolla	Mazda3	Toyota HiLux	Hyundai i30	Holden Commodore ^{L}	Toyota Camry ^{L}	Mitsubishi Triton	Holden Cruze ^{L}	Nissan Navara	Ford Ranger ^{L}
2014	Toyota Corolla	Mazda3	Toyota HiLux	Hyundai i30	Holden Commodore ^{L}	Ford Ranger ^{L}	Mitsubishi Triton	Toyota Camry ^{L}	Mazda CX-5	Volkswagen Golf
2015	Toyota Corolla	Mazda3	Toyota HiLux	Hyundai i30	Ford Ranger ^{L}	Holden Commodore ^{L}	Toyota Camry ^{L}	Mitsubishi Triton	Mazda CX-5	Volkswagen Golf
2016	Toyota HiLux	Toyota Corolla	Hyundai i30	Ford Ranger ^{L}	Mazda3	Toyota Camry ^{L}	Holden Commodore ^{L}	Mazda CX-5	Mitsubishi Triton	Hyundai Tucson
2017	Toyota HiLux	Ford Ranger ^{L}	Toyota Corolla	Mazda3	Hyundai i30	Mazda CX-5	Hyundai Tucson	Holden Commodore ^{L}	Toyota Camry ^{L}	Mitsubishi Triton
2018	Toyota HiLux	Ford Ranger ^{L}	Toyota Corolla	Mazda3	Hyundai i30	Mazda CX-5	Mitsubishi Triton	Toyota RAV4	Nissan X-Trail	Volkswagen Golf
2019	Toyota HiLux	Ford Ranger ^{L}	Toyota Corolla	Hyundai i30	Mitsubishi Triton	Mazda CX-5	Mazda3	Toyota RAV4	Kia Cerato	Mitsubishi ASX
2020	Toyota HiLux	Ford Ranger ^{L}	Toyota RAV4	Toyota Corolla	Mazda CX-5	Hyundai i30	Mitsubishi Triton	Toyota Prado	Kia Cerato	Hyundai Tucson
2021	Toyota HiLux	Ford Ranger ^{L}	Toyota RAV4	Toyota Corolla	Hyundai i30	Isuzu D-Max	Mazda CX-5	Toyota Prado	Mitsubishi Triton	MG ZS
2022	Toyota HiLux	Ford Ranger ^{L}	Toyota RAV4	Mitsubishi Triton	Mazda CX-5	Toyota Corolla	Isuzu D-Max	MG ZS	Hyundai i30	Toyota Prado
2023	Ford Ranger ^{L}	Toyota HiLux	Isuzu D-Max	Toyota RAV4	MG ZS	Tesla Model Y	Mitsubishi Outlander	Mazda CX-5	Hyundai Tucson	Toyota Prado
2024	Ford Ranger ^{L}	Toyota RAV4	Toyota HiLux	Isuzu D-Max	Mitsubishi Outlander	Ford Everest	Toyota Corolla	MG ZS	Kia Sportage	Toyota Prado
2025	Ford Ranger ^{L}	Toyota RAV4	Toyota HiLux	Isuzu D-Max	Ford Everest	Toyota Prado	Hyundai Kona	Mazda CX-5	Mitsubishi Outlander	Tesla Model Y
	1st	2nd	3rd	4th	5th	6th	7th	8th	9th	10th
See also : Best-selling models in: Brazil; India; Indonesia; Japan; Malaysia; Philippines; Thailand; Sweden

== Large scale manufacturers ==
=== Current ===
The current mainstream automotive manufacturers in Australia all build heavy vehicles. Large scale production of light vehicles ended with the departure of Holden.

==== Bustech ====
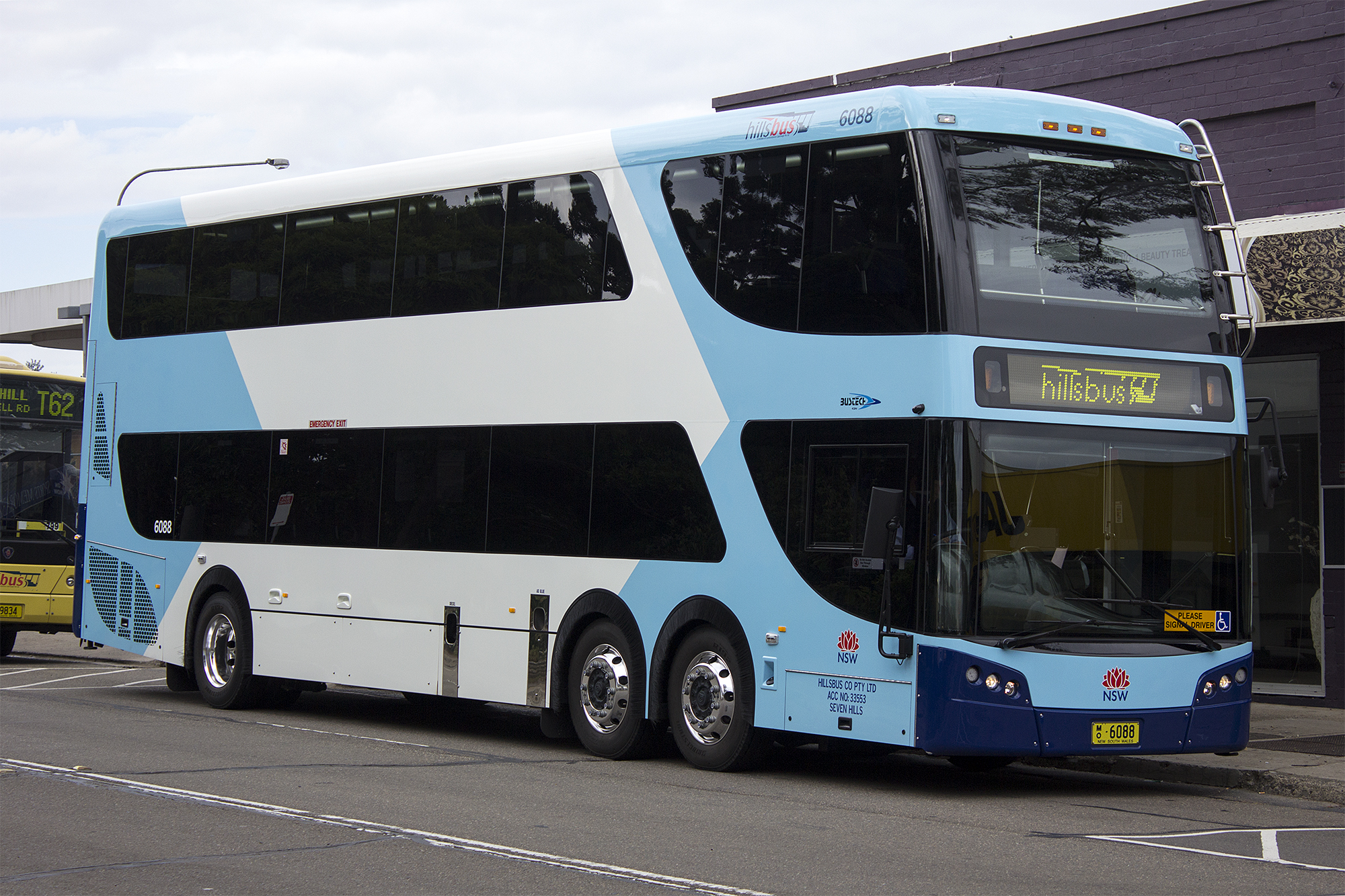
Bustech CDi double decker bus

Bustech has manufactured buses in Gold Coast, Queensland since 1998.

==== Denning Manufacturing ====
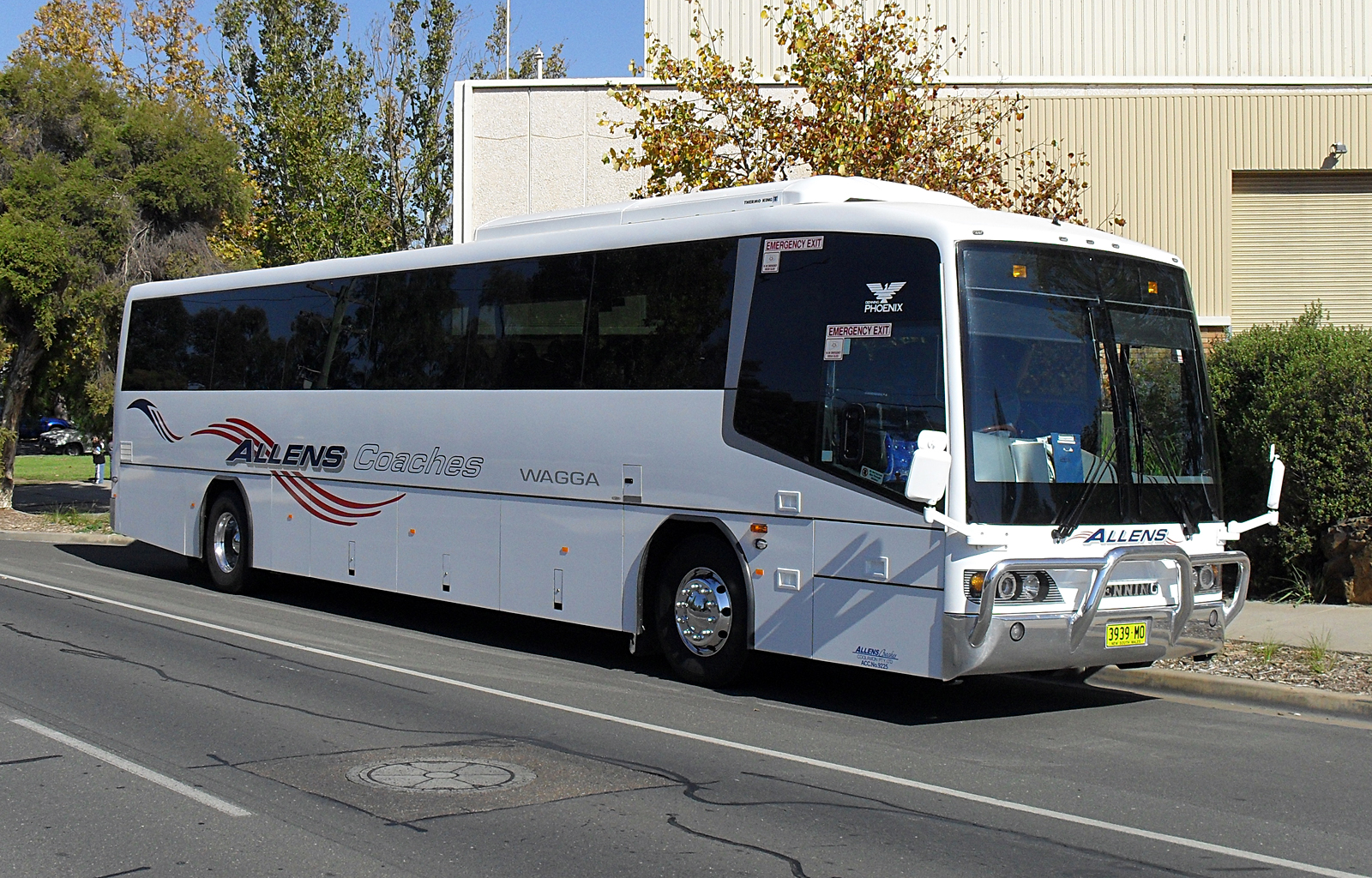
Denning Manufacturing Silver Phoenix

Denning Manufacturing has manufactured buses in Brisbane since 2004

==== Kenworth ====
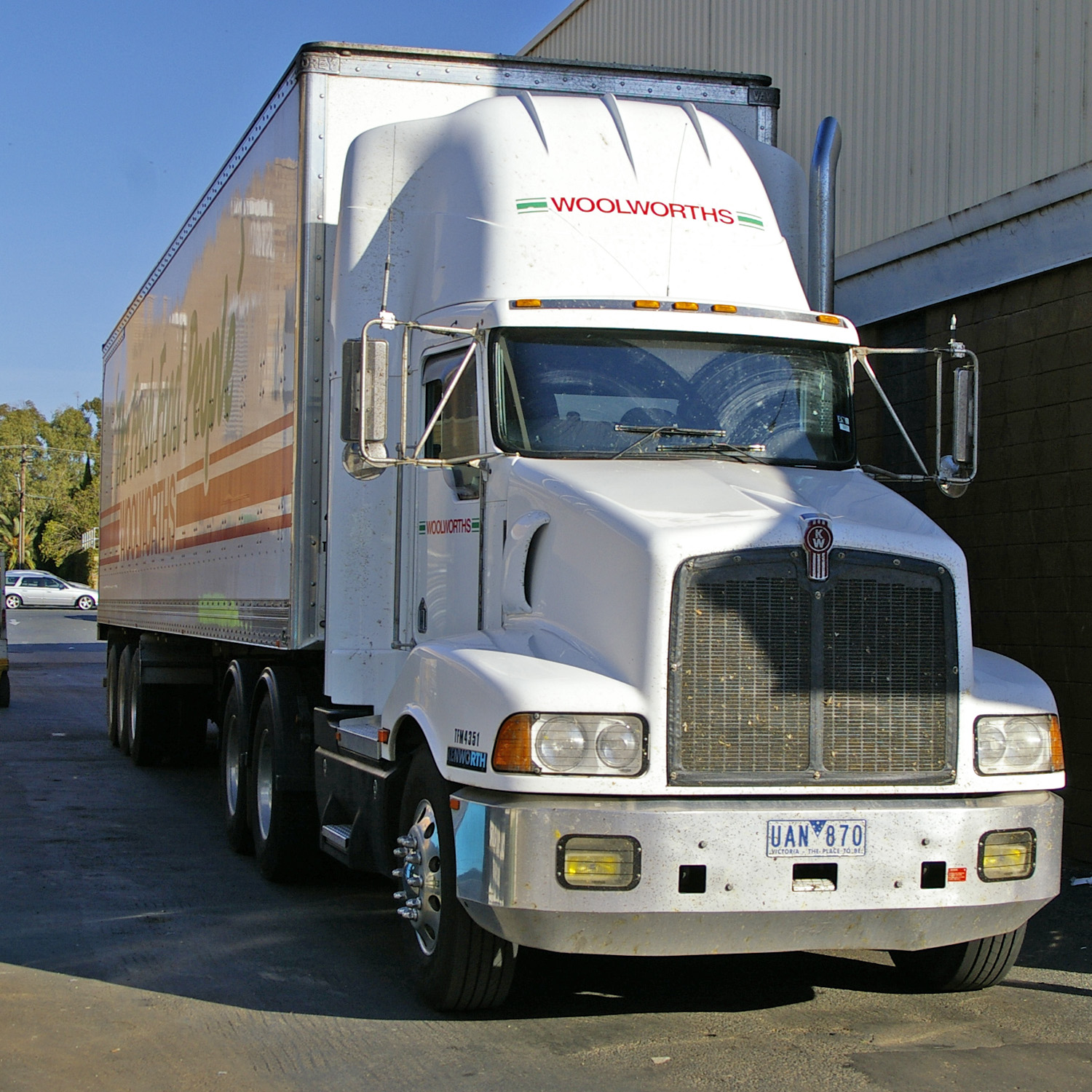
Kenworth T404

Kenworth Australia is a wholly owned subsidiary of Paccar Inc. Kenworth are currently the largest single-nameplate manufacturer in Australia. Kenworth began Australian production in 1971 and mainly manufactures heavy duty semi trucks specifically for the Australian and New Zealand markets at their plant in Bayswater, Victoria. In 2018, Paccar began assembly of DAF Trucks from a facility next to Kenworth.

==== Mack ====
Mack trucks have been manufactured in Australia since 1963, starting at Archerfield, Queensland, moving to Rocklea, Queensland three years later, and in 1981 moved to Richlands, Queensland.

On 26 April 2000, Volvo acquired the truck and bus arm of Renault. This sale included Mack. Volvo Group Australia moved Mack production into their Wacol facility not long after.

==== Volvo ====
Volvo Group Australia began Australian production in Wacol, Queensland in 1972.

After the acquisition of Mack in April 2000, both manufacturers were merged into the one facility at Wacol. This is now the largest vehicle plant in Australia.

=== Previous ===
==== Australian Motor Industries ====
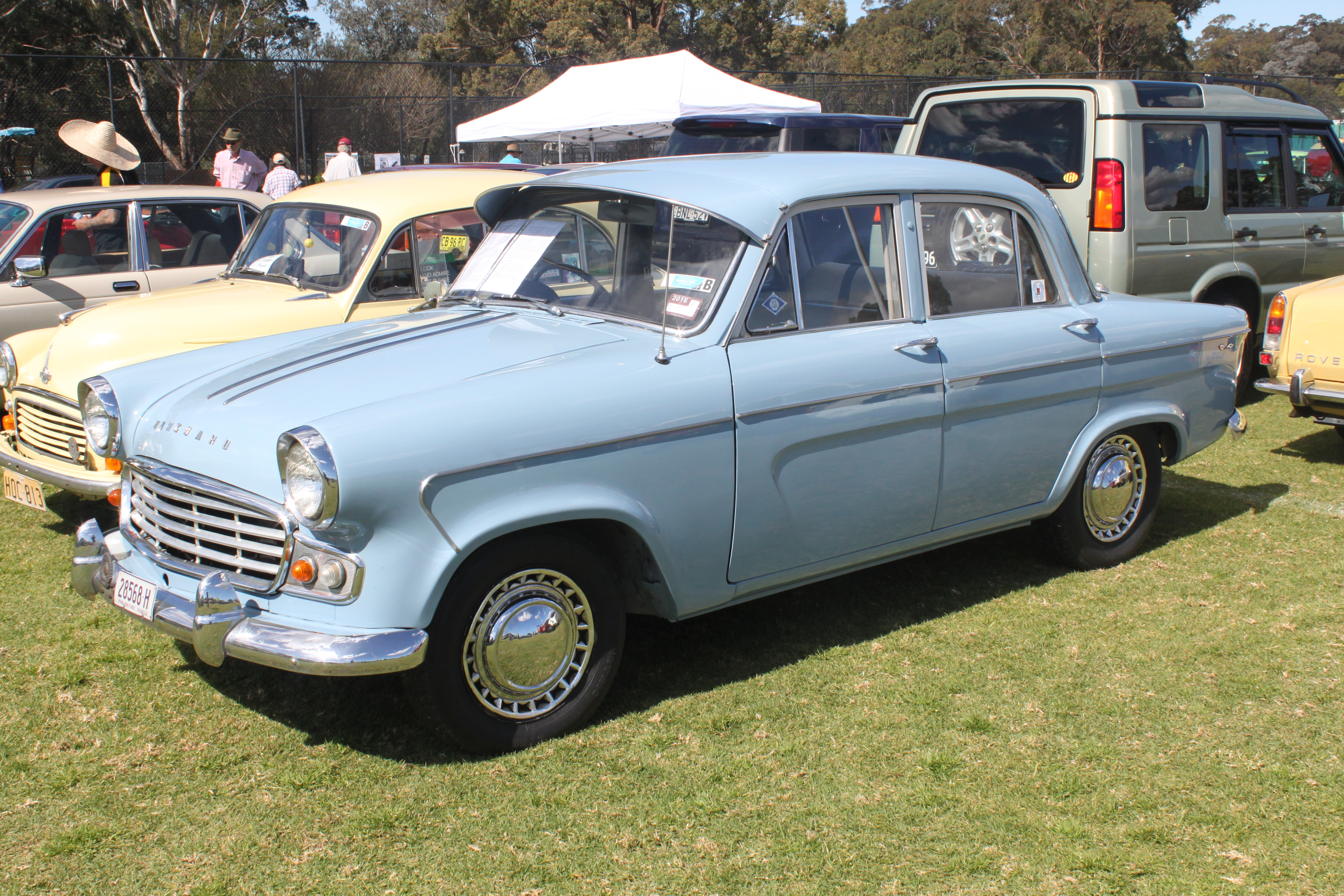
The Standard Vanguard was one of many models produced by Australian Motor Industries.

Founded in 1926, Australian Motor Industries (AMI) began assembly operations in 1952. It produced a wide range of Standard, Triumph, Mercedes-Benz cars, as well as variety of Rambler models from American Motors Corporation (AMC) up to 1987. Assembly of Toyota automobiles began in 1963. The Japanese company took a controlling interest in AMI in 1968 and increased its investment until AMI renamed itself as AMI Toyota Ltd in 1985.

==== British Leyland ====
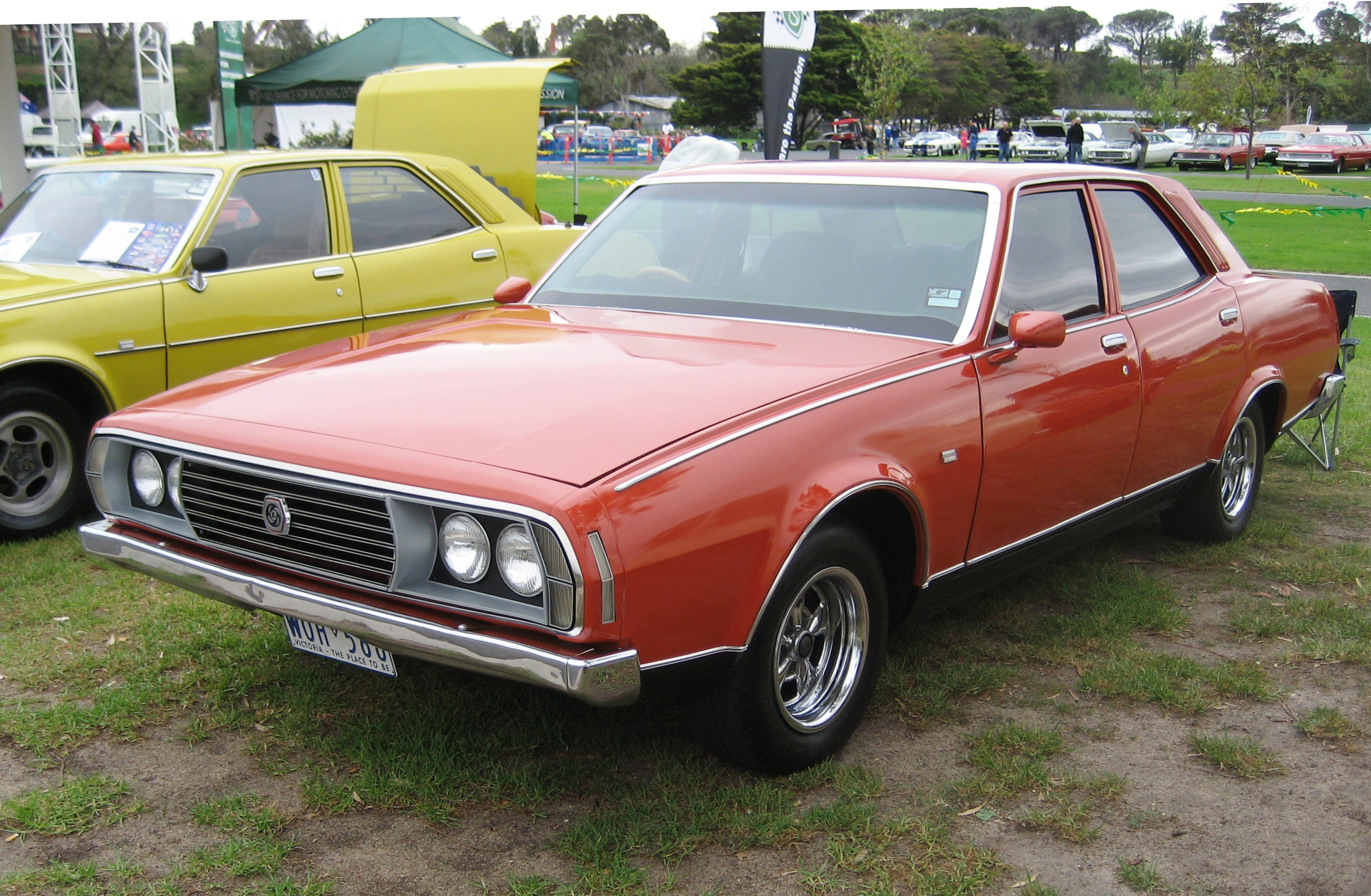
British Leyland's Australian subsidiary produced the Leyland P76 from 1973 to 1975.

British Leyland assembled and manufactured vehicles in Australia from 1950 to 1975. British Leyland was formed when Leyland Motors and British Motor Holdings (formerly BMC) merged.

==== Chrysler Australia ====
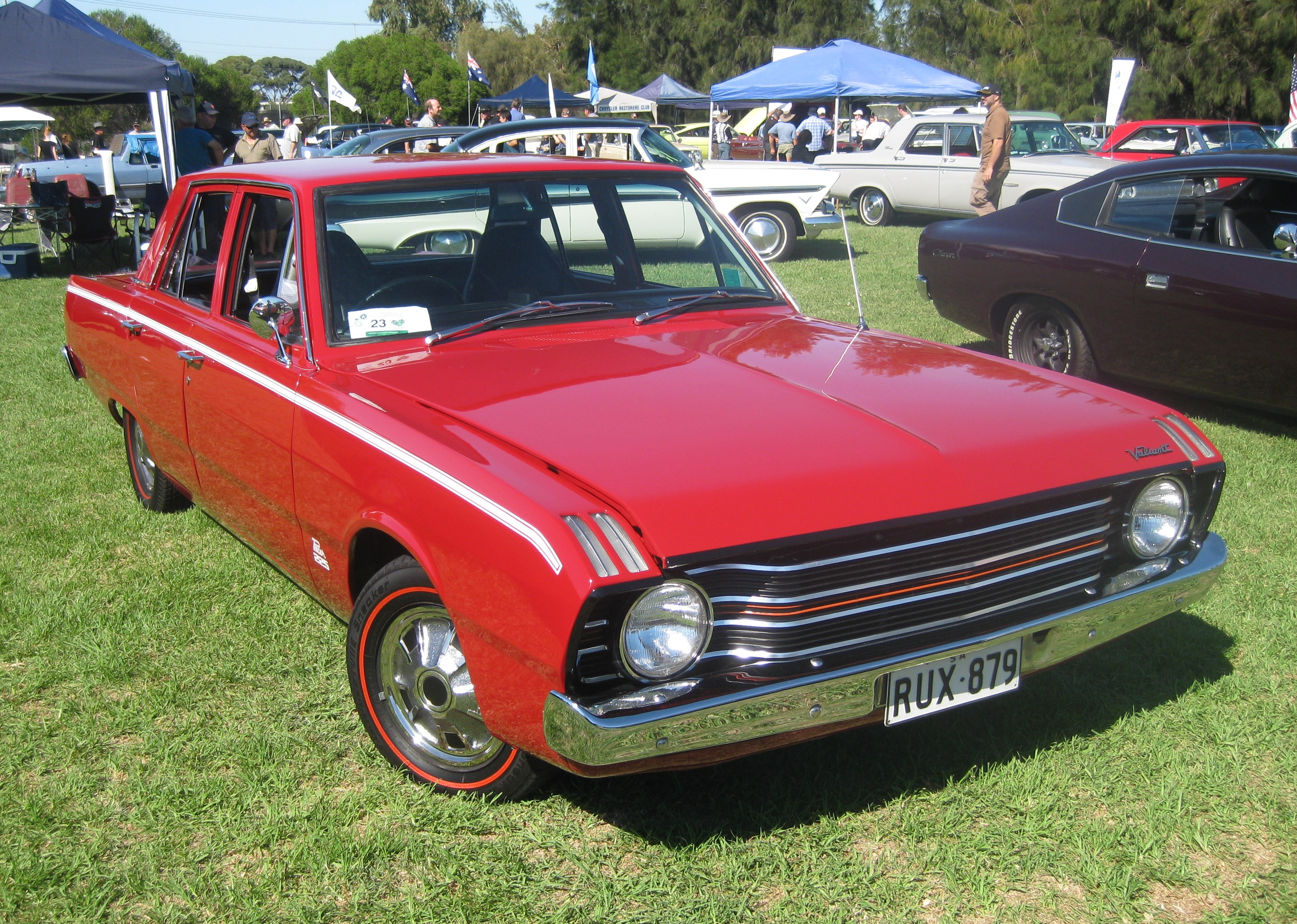
Chrysler Australia produced the Chrysler Valiant from 1962 to 1980.

Chrysler departed the Australian car market in 1981 when it sold the remainder of its shareholding in Chrysler Australia Ltd to the Mitsubishi Motor Corporation of Japan. The new owner renamed the company Mitsubishi Motors Australia (MMA) and this company continues to operate today as one of Australia's major importers of road vehicles. However, local production of passenger vehicles was discontinued in March 2008. During the 1970s, Chrysler began working closely with Mitsubishi Motors Corporation after they acquired a 15 percent interest in the company in 1971, with the result that Chrysler Australia began building Mitsubishi-designed Chrysler-branded vehicles such as the Chrysler Valiant Galant (1972–1977 Mitsubishi Galant) and the Chrysler Sigma (1977–1985 Mitsubishi Galant). The Tonsley Park plant was sold to Mitsubishi Motors Corporation and was run by Mitsubishi Motors Australia after Chrysler pulled out of Australian manufacturing in 1980. Production of the popular Sigma and Colt range of vehicles continued under the Mitsubishi name until the late-1980s, when production was switched exclusively to the Magna.

==== Ford Australia ====
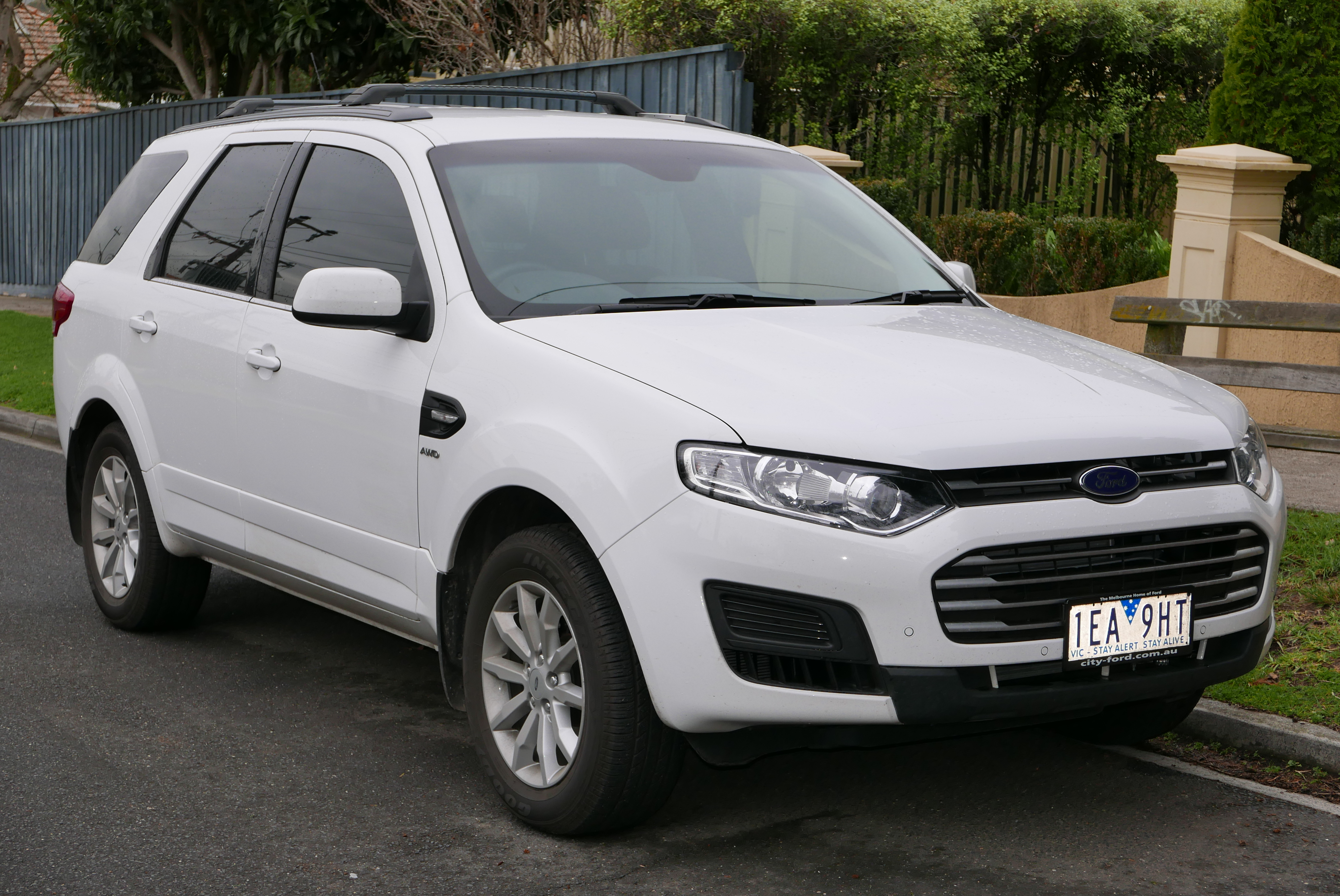
The Ford Territory, an Australian SUV

Ford Australia is the Australian subsidiary of Ford Motor Company and was founded in Geelong in 1925 as an outpost of Ford Motor Company of Canada, Limited. At that time, Ford Canada was a separate company from Ford USA. Henry Ford had granted the manufacturing rights to Ford in British Empire (later Commonwealth) countries (excepting the UK) to Canadian investors. Ford Australia also has a performance car division, Ford Performance Vehicles, with the cars being marketed under the FPV brand. In May 2013 Ford announced that it will end Australian production in October 2016, but will remain as a competitor in the Australian marketplace with imported vehicles. All factories had closed by 20 October 2016.

==== Holden ====
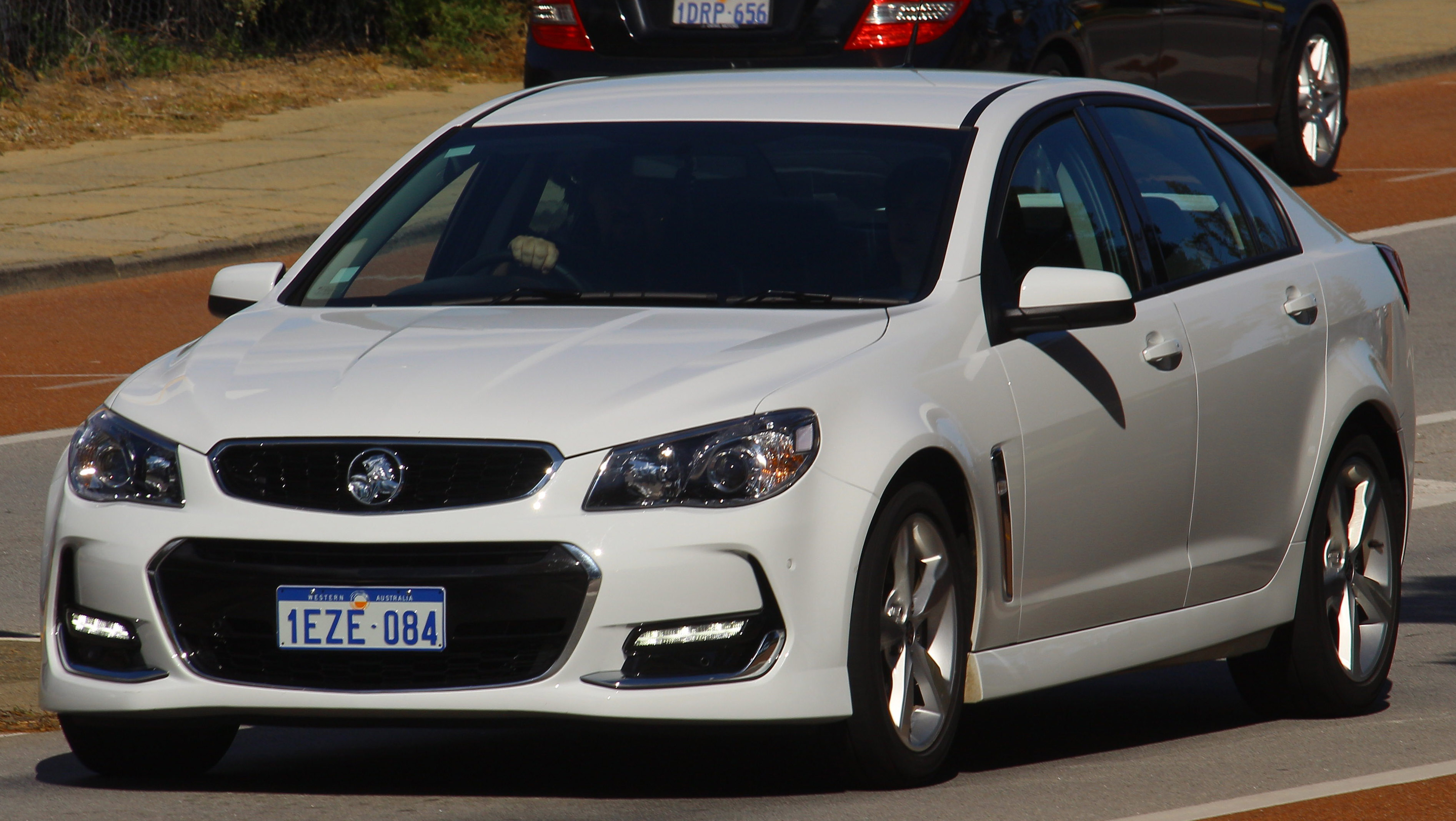
The Holden Commodore (prior to 2018) was a locally produced vehicle by Holden.

Holden was an Australian automaker based in Elizabeth, South Australia. After local production ended in 2017, the company became an importer of GM-branded motor vehicles. The company was founded in 1856 as a saddlery business in Adelaide, South Australia, but later moved into the automotive field, becoming a subsidiary of General Motors (GM) in 1931. Holden has taken charge of vehicle operations for GM in Australasia and, on behalf of GM, holds partial ownership of GM Korea (formerly GM Daewoo) in South Korea. Over the years, Holden has offered a broad range of original, locally produced vehicles (such as the Holden Commodore), supplemented by imported GM models. In the past, Holden had offered badge-engineered Chevrolet, Isuzu, Nissan, Suzuki, Toyota, and Vauxhall Motors models in sharing arrangements, with Daewoo, Opel, and Isuzu-sourced models sold in later years. Holden also had a performance vehicle partner, Holden Special Vehicles, which marketed modified Holdens under the HSV brand. In December 2013, Holden announced they would end their local manufacturing operations in Australia on 20 October 2017. After the closure of its production plant in Elizabeth, South Australia, Holden changed its business focus to car styling and importing. The Holden brand name was retired in 2020 and dealers compensated as they were shut down.

==== Iveco ====
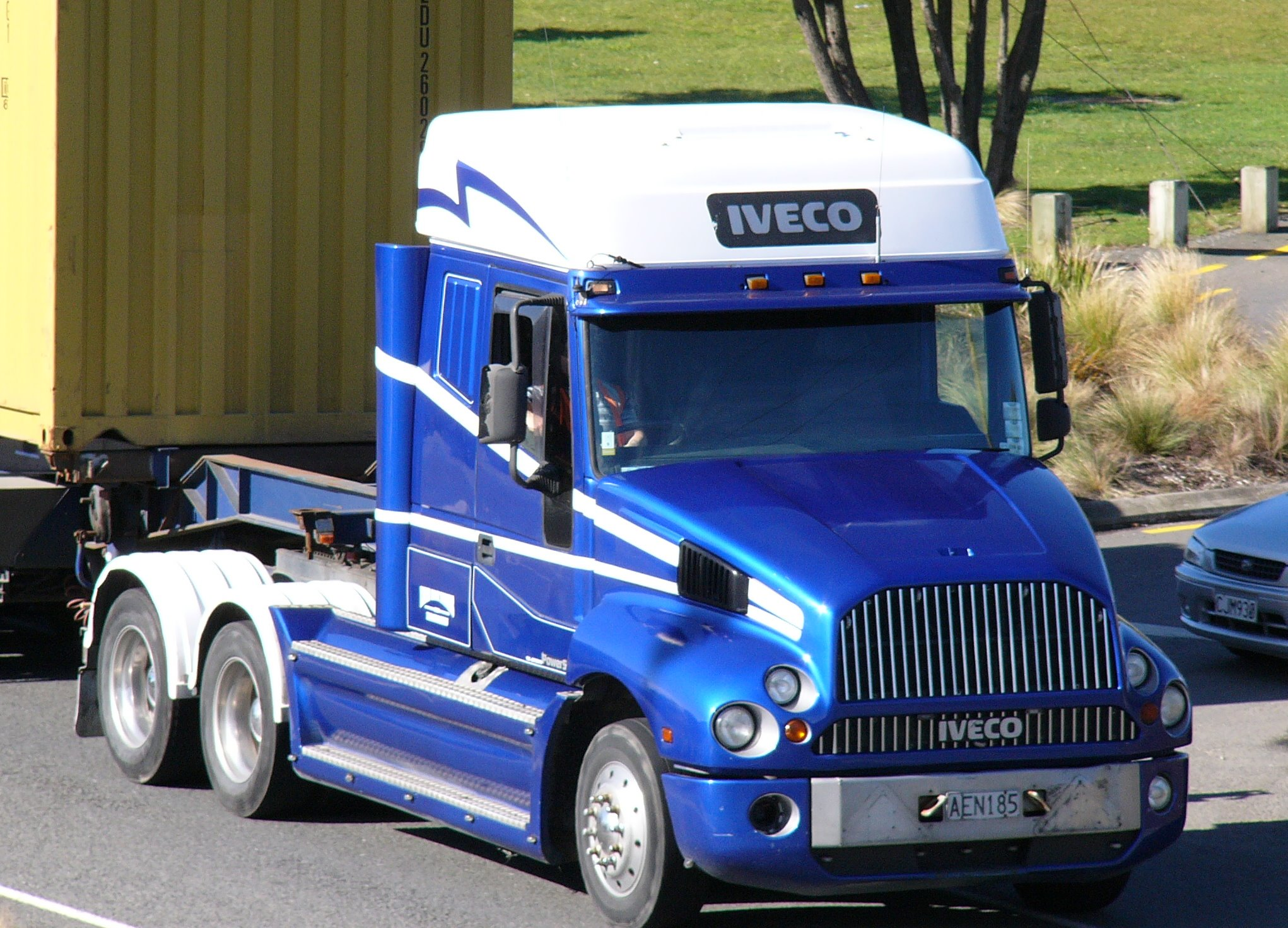
Australian built pre-generation Iveco PowerStar assembled in Dandenong

Iveco Australia is a subsidiary of CNH Industrial and was formed after the takeover of International Trucks. It produced the Iveco PowerStar in a number of variants and, up until 2020, the ACCO. It was known for being the only foreign semi truck maker that was not producing an American branded conventional semi truck.

IVECO Australia ceased local manufacturing at its Dandenong plant in June 2022.

==== Leader Trucks ====
Leader Trucks was a truck manufacturing company based in Toowoomba, Queensland, Australia. It was established as an initiative of Cyril Anderson and Western Transport. Nearly 2,000 trucks were manufactured between 1972 and 1984.

==== Mitsubishi Motors Australia ====
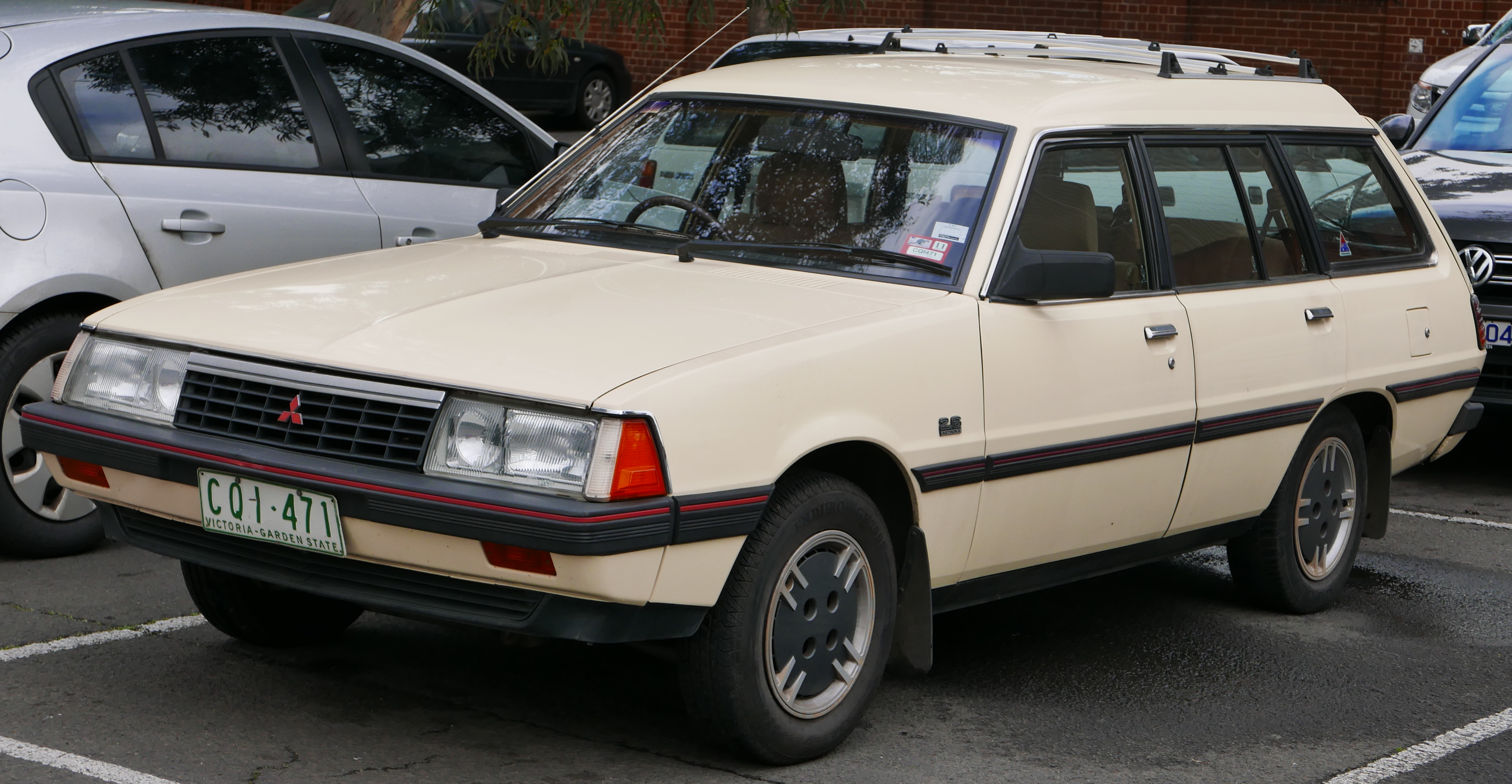
Mitsubishi Motors Australia produced the Sigma from 1980 to 1987.

Mitsubishi Motors Australia (MMA) is a fully owned subsidiary of parent company Mitsubishi Motors Corporation of Japan. A site in Tonsley, South Australia was the location of MMA's vehicle assembly plant. The plant was closed in March 2008 when lacklustre sales of the large Mitsubishi 380 confirmed that domestic vehicle manufacturing was no longer viable.

==== Nissan Australia ====
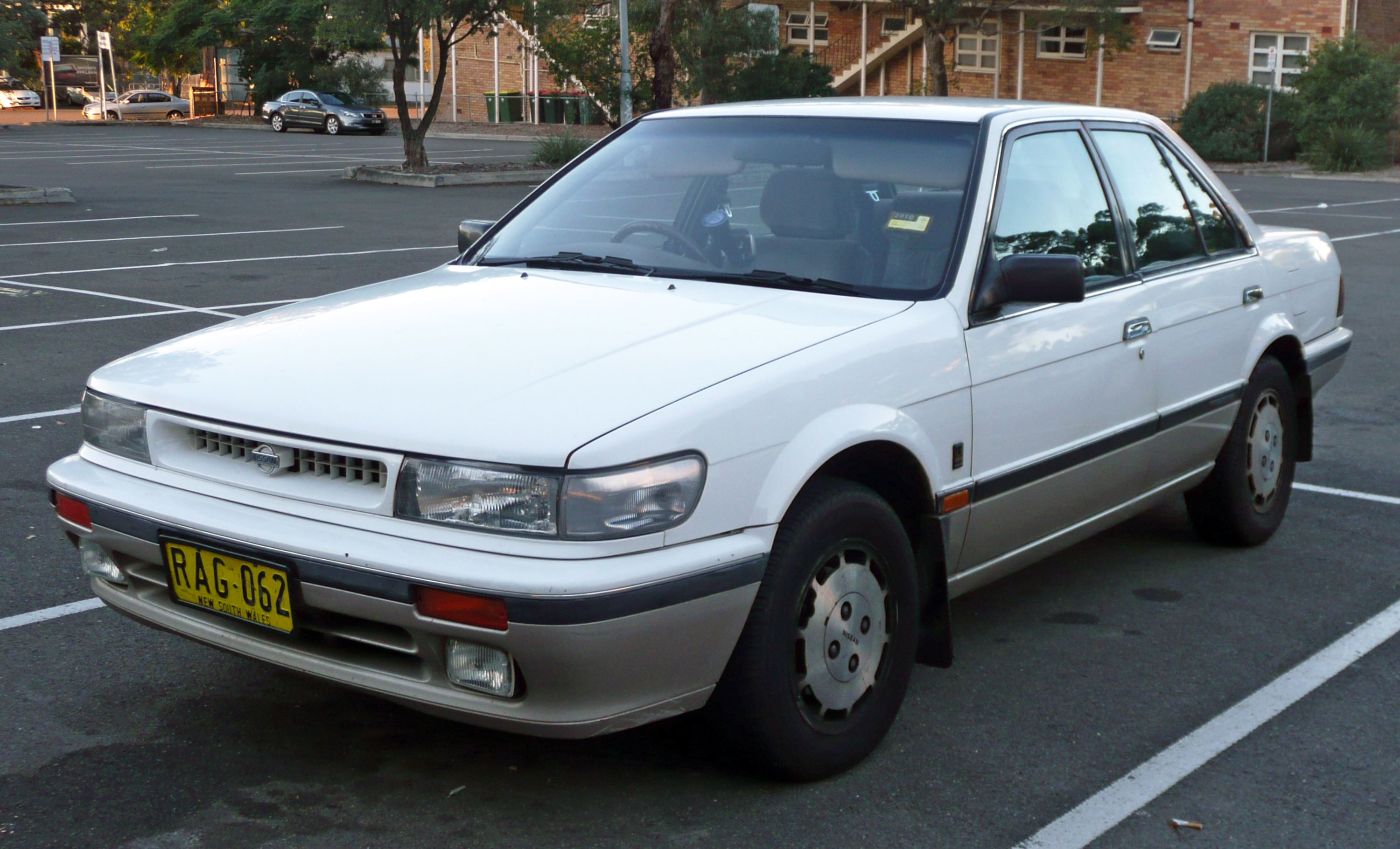
The Nissan Pintara was a product of Nissan Australia.

Nissan began assembling cars in 1966, when Pressed Metal Corporation began assembly of the Datsun Bluebird 1300. This deal ended after about a year and a half, but by 1968 Motor Producers Ltd. of Melbourne began assembling Datsuns again at their Clayton plant. By 1971 locally assembled cars were to include the 1200 and 1600 saloons, with at least 60% local parts content. A deal lasting until 1976 was signed with Motor Producers.

Nissan used the Clayton factory to build cars in the wake of the 1973 oil crisis. Models produced in Australia included the Pulsar, Pintara, and Skyline. By the end of the 1980s, however, Nissan was facing financial difficulties, while Nissan's local car assembly lines closed in 1992.

==== Renault Australia ====
Renault (Australia) Pty Ltd was established in the late 1950s to organise the importation and contract assembly of Renault vehicles in Australia. In August 1966 Renault Australia purchased the assembly facilities of Continental and General Distributors at Heidelberg in Victoria. Models including the Renault 10, 12, 16 and 18 were assembled and the company also entered into an agreement to assemble cars for Peugeot. Australian production ended with the closure of the Heidelberg plant in July 1981 with LNC Industries then taking over importation and distribution of Renaults in Australia. As of 2012, Renault vehicles are sold in Australia through Vehicle Distributors Australia, a wholly owned subsidiary of Nissan Australia.

==== Rootes Australia ====
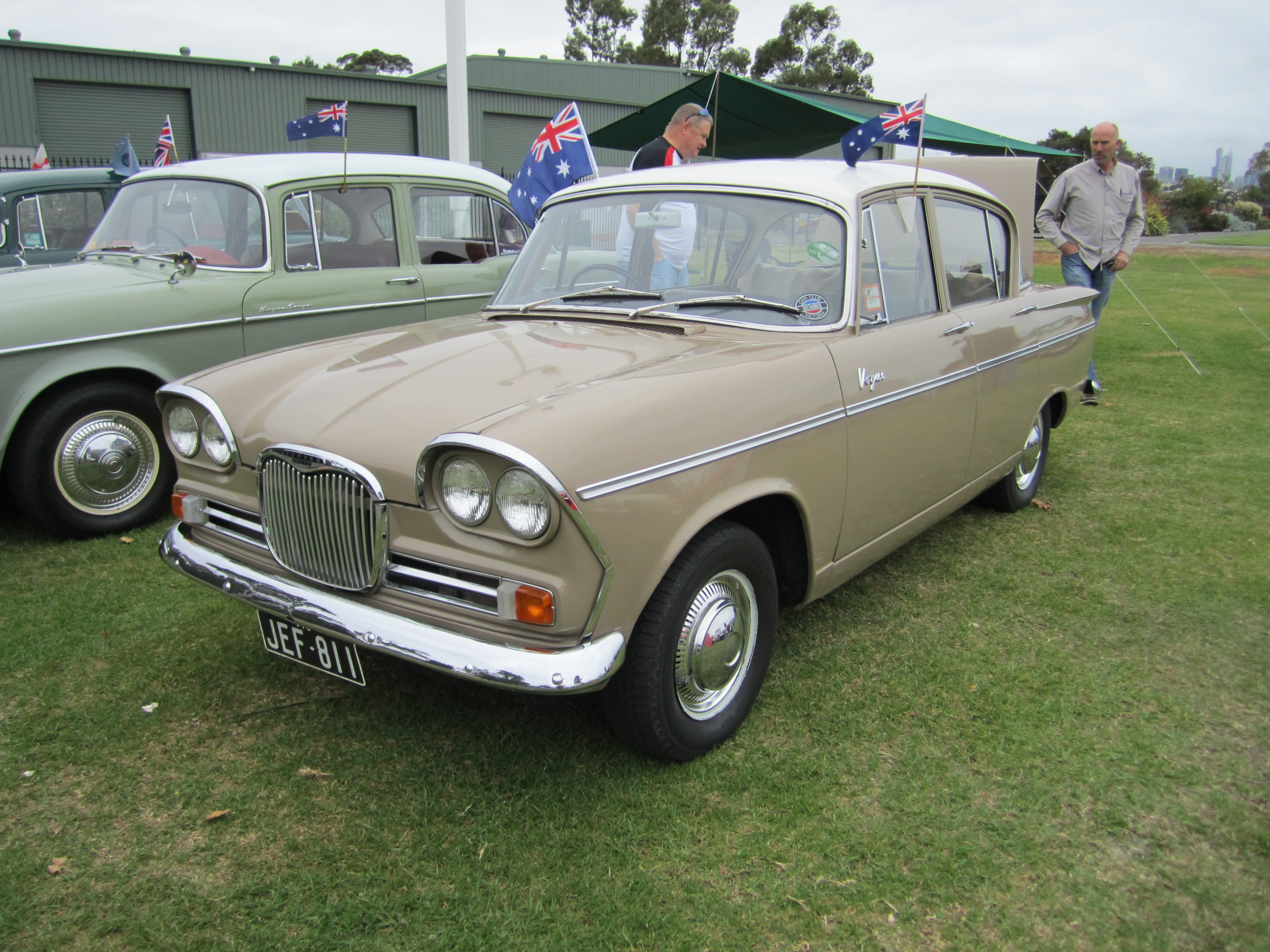
The Humber Vogue was produced by Rootes Australia.

Rootes Australia produced a range of Hillman, Humber, and Singer automobiles in Australia between 1946 and 1965. In December 1965, Rootes Australia was merged with Chrysler Australia.

==== Toyota Australia ====
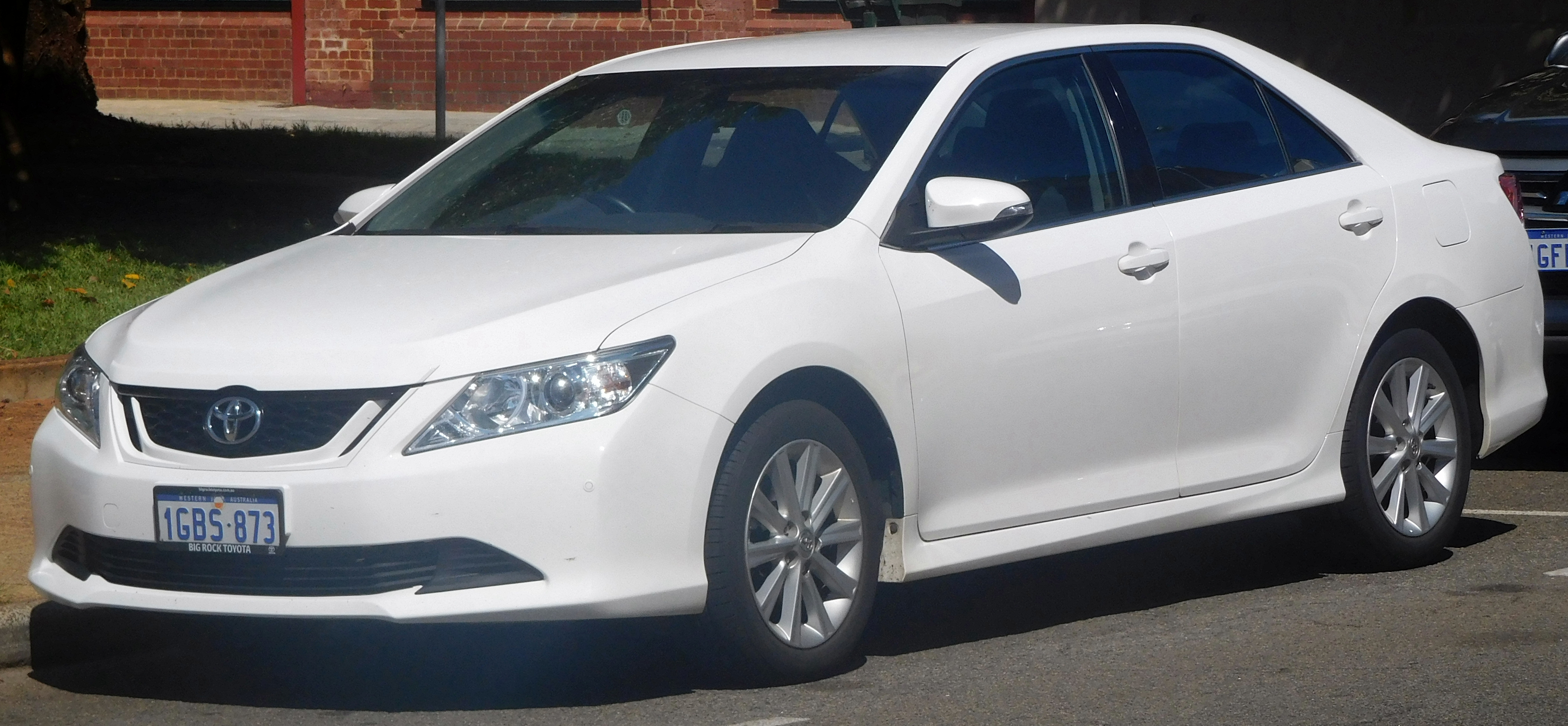
Toyota Aurion, built at the Altona plant

Toyota Australia (TA), is a subsidiary of Toyota. TA first began in 1958, TA markets Toyota products and manages motorsport, advertising and business operations for Toyota in Australia. TA is also responsible for Lexus vehicles in Australia.

On 10 February 2014, Toyota announced it would cease manufacturing vehicles and engines in Australia. The Altona plant was closed on 3 October 2017, marking the end of locally produced Toyota vehicles in Australia.

==== Volkswagen Australia ====
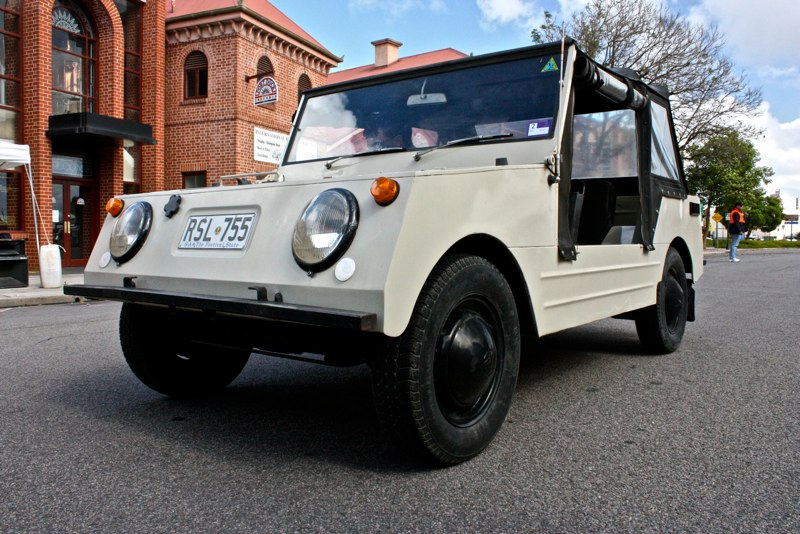
The Volkswagen Country Buggy was a product of Volkswagen Australia.

Volkswagen Australia Pty Ltd was formed in 1954 by Volkswagen of Germany and various Australian state Volkswagen distributors. The company acquired a suitable site from Martin & King situated at Clayton having facilities for CKD vehicle assembly in Victoria, that site having been used for local assembly of the Volkswagen Beetle since 1954. By 1960, sheet metal panels were being pressed at Clayton, and by 1967 the engine and most components were being produced there.

In 1967 Volkswagen Australia developed a unique model, the Country Buggy, which used components from the Beetle and the Kombi. This local design was later also manufactured in the Philippines.

Due to falling sales, the operation reverted to assembly only in 1968. A new company, Motor Producers Limited, was formed and operations were expanded to include Datsun and Volvo models as well as Volkswagens. The factory was sold to Nissan in 1976 and Australian assembly of Volkswagens ended shortly after.

==== Western Star ====
Western Star began assembly of kit trucks in 1983 at the former White Trucks factory in Wacol, Queensland. The kits were imported from Kelowna, BC Canada. This continued until 1992, when fully built trucks were imported from Canada.

== Small-scale producers ==
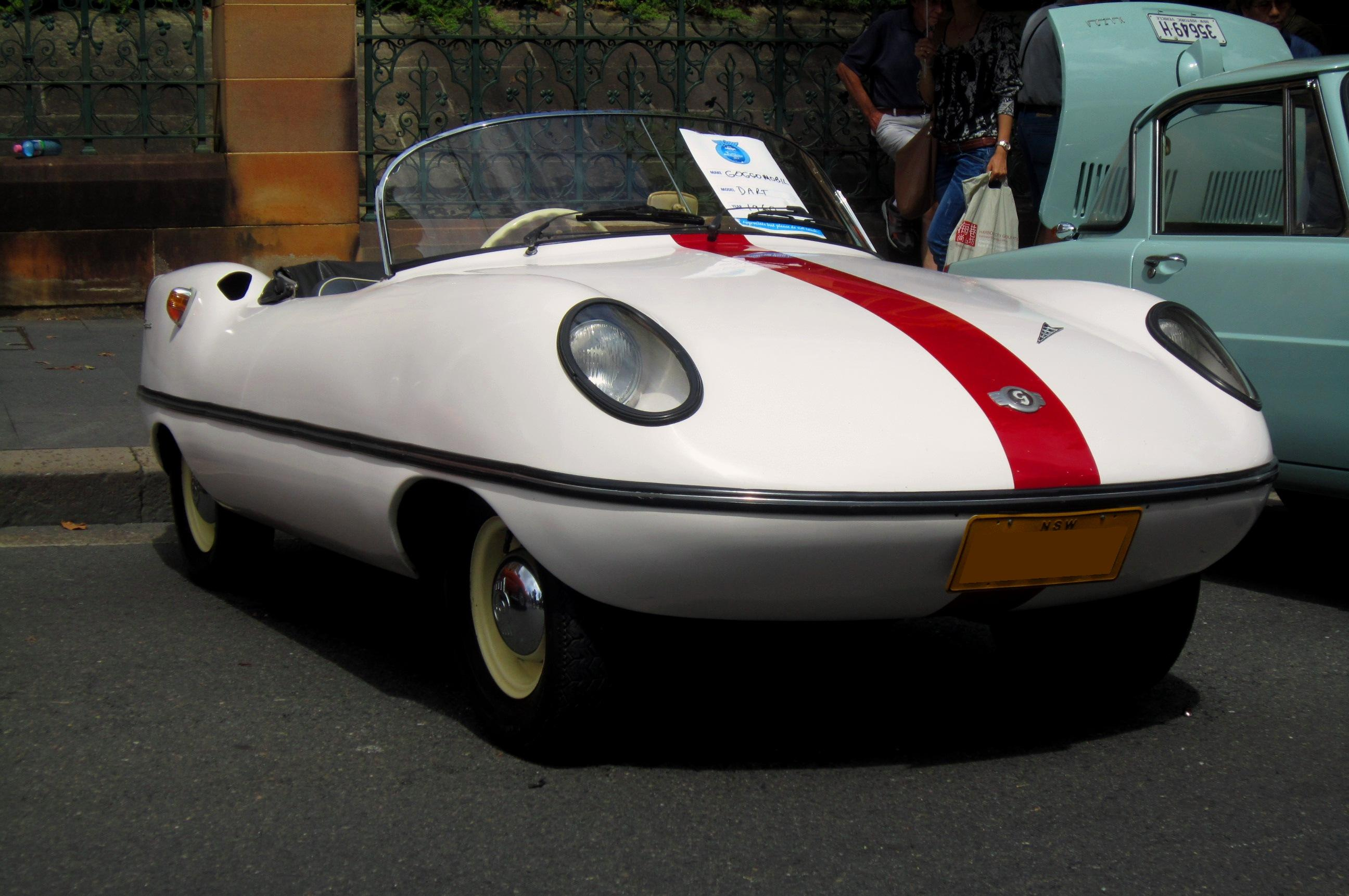
A Goggomobil Dart

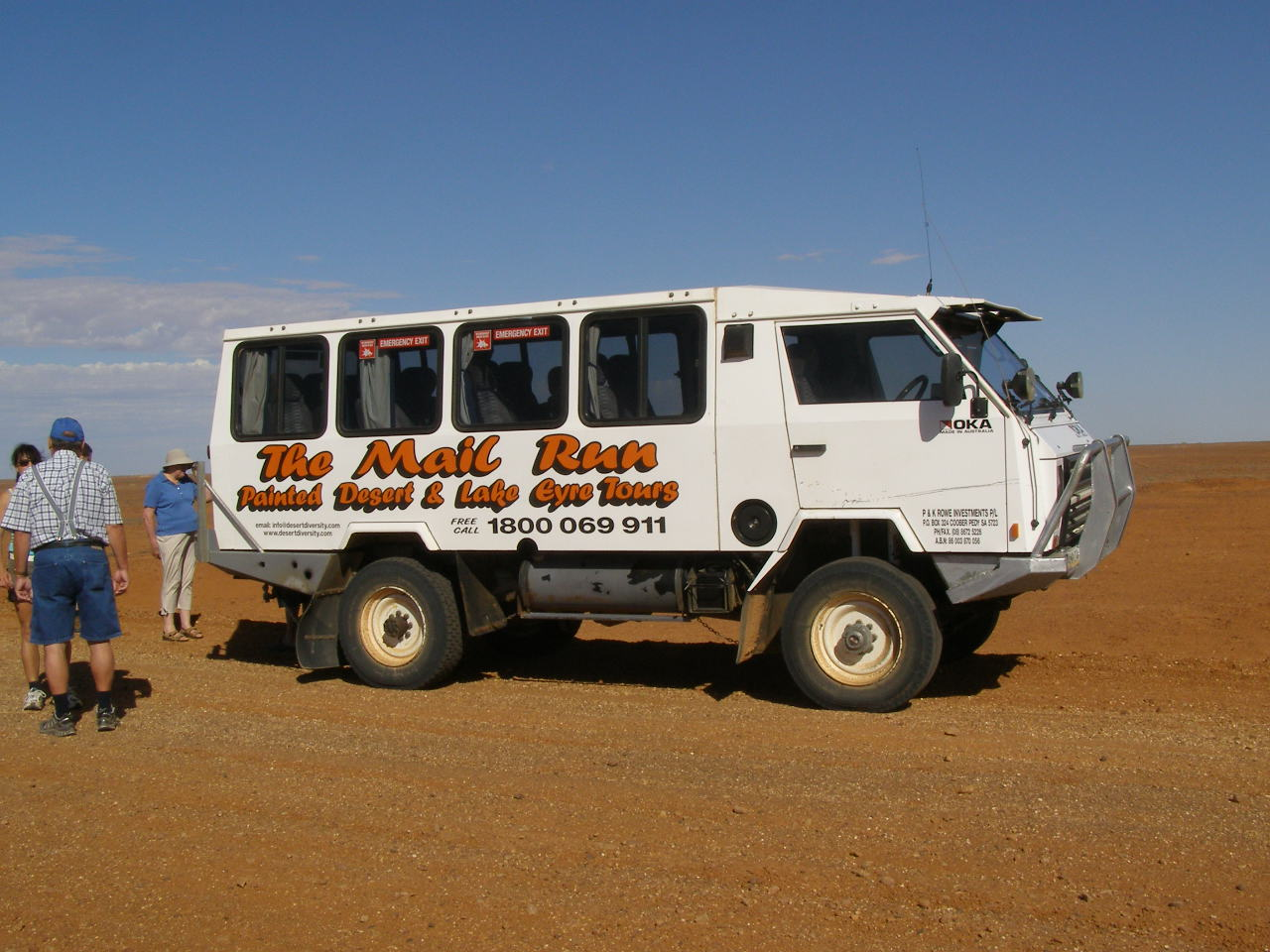
An OKA 4wd

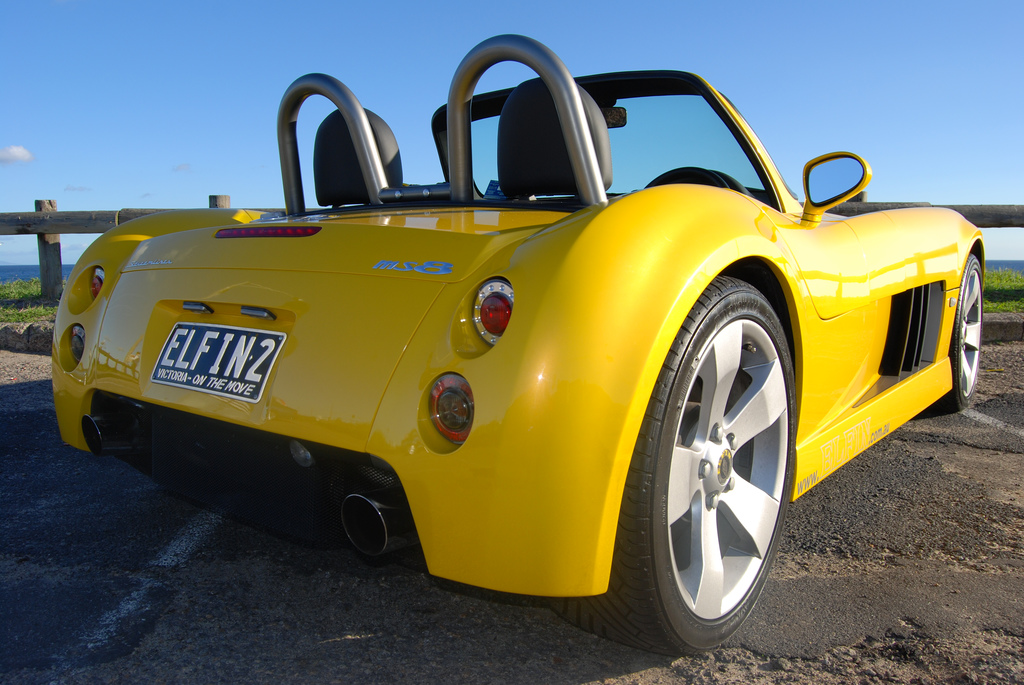
An Elfin MS8 Streamliner

There are a number of current, previous or future small scale producers of cars in Australia, including;

- Absolute Pace (1990–no longer present)
- ACE EV (2018 – present)
- Alpha Sports
- Amuza
- Ascort (1958–1960)
- Australian Six (1919–1930)
- Australis (1897–1907)
- Austral
- Birchfield (2003–present)
- Birrana
- Blade Electric Vehicles
- Bolwell (1963–1979, 2009–present)
- Bomac
- Borland Racing Developments
- Bowin Cars (1968–1976)
- Brabham Automotive (2017–2024)
- Buchanan
- Buckle Motors
- Bullet (1996–present)
- Bushranger
- Caldwell Vale (1907–1913)
- Canstel
- Carbontech (1999–present)
- Cheetah Racing Cars
- Chic (circa 1920s)
- Classic Glass
- Classic Revival (1989–present)
- Cobra Craft
- Custom Denning (1935–present)
- Daktari
- Daytona (2002–present)
- Denning (1994–2024)
- Deuce Customs (1979–present)
- Devaux (2001–present)
- DRB Sports Cars (1997–present)
- E-Vade
- Elfin (1958–present)
- Evans
- Finch (1964–present)
- G-Force (1986–present)
- Giocattolo (1986–1989)
- Goggomobile (1958–1961)
- Hartnett (1949–1955)
- Harden Electric Vehicles (2020 – present)
- Homebush
- Ilinga (1974–1975)
- Joss
- Kraftwerkz (2002–present)
- Lightburn (1963–1965)
- Lloyd-Hartnett
- Matich (1967–1974)
- Minetti Sports Cars
- Nota (1955–present)
- OKA (1986–2011)
- Pellandini Cars (1970–1978)
- Pioneer (1897–1898)
- Piper
- PMC Australia\Ansair
- PRB
- Purvis (1974–1991)
- Python (1981–present)
- Ralt
- RCM
- Rennmax (1962–1978)
- RFW
- RMC
- Roaring Forties (1997–present)
- Robnell
- Sharpbuilt
- Shrike (1988–1991)
- Skelta (2004–present)
- Southern Cross (1931–1935)
- Studebaker (1960-1966)
- Tomcar (2005–present)
- White Pointer (car)
- Drive South (2020–present)

== Tuning companies ==
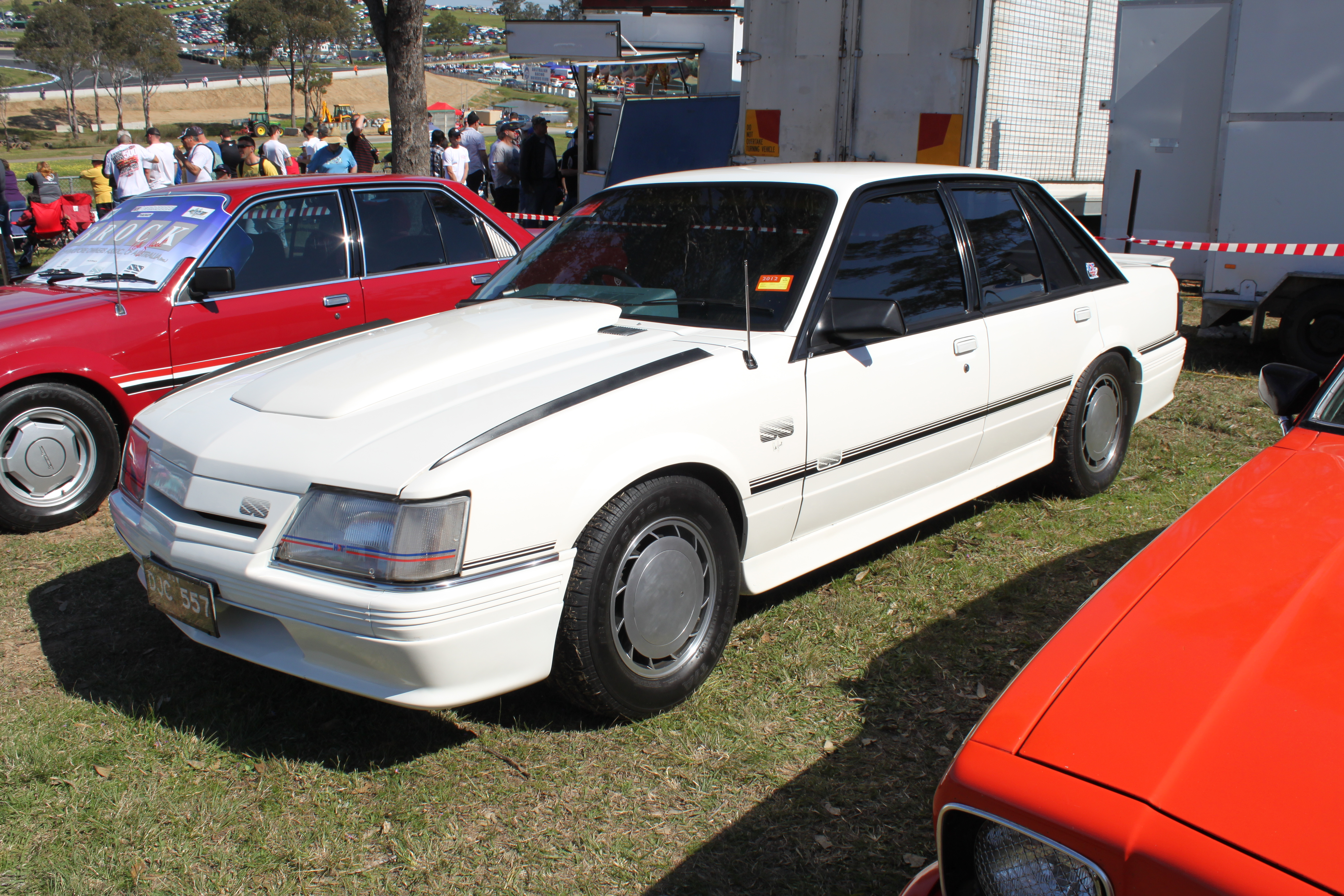
A HDT VK Commodore SS

Current tuning or customisation companies in Australia include:

- General Motors Specialty Vehicles (GMSV) – official performance vehicle partner of General Motors in Australia
- Tekno Autosports
- Tickford Racing
- Walkinshaw Performance – authorised Holden Special Vehicles and Hummer tuning company
- Corsa Specialised Vehicles (CSV) is a small-scale automaker established in 1994 that is based in Mildura, Australia. Its range consists of V8 engine high performance cars based on those produced by Holden.

== Past tuning companies ==
- Dick Johnson Racing
- Ford Tickford Experience (FTE) – former official performance vehicle partner of Ford Australia (1991–2002)
- Ford Performance Vehicles (FPV) – Ford Australia's in-house tuning company (2002–2014)
- HDT Special Vehicles (HDT) – former Holden tuning company (manufacturing arm of the Holden Dealer Team)
- Holden Special Vehicles (HSV) – former official performance vehicle partner of Holden
- Wayne Gardner Racing

== See also ==
- Manufacturing in Australia
- Button car plan
- Automotive industry in New Zealand
- Deindustrialization
