= Birchfield =

Birchfield may refer to:

== Places ==
- Birchfield, Birmingham, England, United Kingdom, a suburb of Birmingham
- Birchfield, New Jersey, United States an unincorporated community
- Birchfield Halt railway station, a former railway station in Rothes, Scotland, United Kingdom
- St Kieran's College, formerly known as Birchfield College, Roman Catholic secondary school in Kilkenny, Ireland

== Other uses ==
- Birchfield (surname)
- Birchfield (car), a former Australian car manufacturer
- Birchfield v. North Dakota, a United States Supreme Court case about testing of drivers suspected to be under the influence
