= Oakman-Hertel =

Defunct American motor vehicle manufacturer

Oakman Motor Vehicle Company
- Company type: Automobile manufacturer
- Founded: 1899; 126 years ago
- Founder: Max Hertel
- Defunct: 1900; 125 years ago
- Fate: Closed
- Products: Automobiles

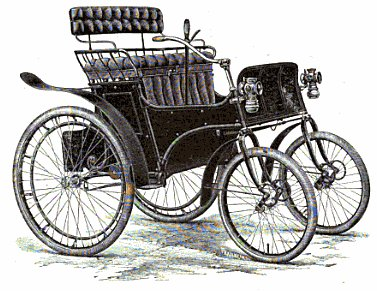
1899 Hertel (Oakman-Hertel)

Hertel or Oakman-Hertel was an American veteran automobile company in Greenfield, Massachusetts started in 1899 and closing in 1900.

== History ==
Max Hertel was an engineer for the American Biscuit Company and entered the 1895 Chicago Times-Herald Race. His small two-cylinder gasoline car, built between two bicycle frames, broke the steering gear on the way to the starting line and he could not compete.

In 1897, Australian businessman John Pender commissioned a car. Hertel manufactured the car and shipped it to Melbourne. The Pender-Hertel is believed to be the first automobile imported into Australia.

In 1899 Hertel established the Oakman Motor Vehicle Company in Greenfield, Massachusetts. The company produced a two-seat, two-cylinder (581 cc; 2,5 HP), tiller steered runabout which sold for $750 (equivalent to $28,347 in 2024), that was very similar to his Times-Herald car. The vehicle weight was 214 kg. The fuel tank was designed for a range of 120 km. According to this source the displacement of the two-cylinder engine was 1607 cc with a bore of 92.075 mm and a stroke of 120.65 mm.

With very few cars selling, creditors closed Hertel's factory in November 1900.
