= ACE Urban =

Overview
- Manufacturer: ACE EV Group
- Production: 2022 (to commence)
- Assembly: Australia: Adelaide, South Australia

Body and chassis
- Class: City car
- Body style: 3-door hatchback
- Layout: All wheel drive

Powertrain
- Battery: 23 kWh
- Electric range: 150–200 km (93–124 mi)

The ACE Urban is an electric city car produced by the ACE EV Group from 2022.

== Overview ==
In addition to the Yewt and Cargo, the Australian startup ACE that aims to develop electric cars in 2019 also introduced a small passenger car called the Urban. Like the two aforementioned models, the car adopted oval proportions with two-tone body paint and an upturned window line. The vehicle can transport up to 4 people.

Pre-orders of the Urban opened in February 2021, and as of late 2020 it is expected to reach its first customers in Australia in mid-2022. The vehicle is to be manufactured in Adelaide, along with the company's other products.

== Specifications ==
Like other models in the ACE range, the Urban hatchback offers a range of 150–200 kilometres (93–124 mi) on a single charge, depending on driving style. Also, the Urban has a maximum speed of 100 km/h (62 mph) and also takes up to 8 hours to charge. The Urban starts at $35,995 AUD with available options such as heated seats and soft carpeting. Notably, power-assisted steering is a non-standard option.
