= Birchfield (surname) =

Birchfield is a surname. Notable people with the surname include:

- Allan Birchfield (born 1949/1950), New Zealand coal and gold miner
- Bill Birchfield (1935–2016), American politician, lawyer, and civic leader
- Connie Birchfield (1898–1994), New Zealand housekeeper, trade unionist, and political activist
