= Tarrant automobile =

Automobile manufacturer

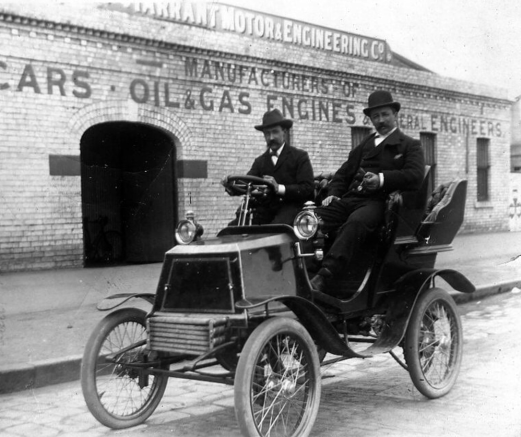
A Tarrant automobile outside the factory in South Melbourne.

The Tarrant automobile was the first motor car built in Victoria, Australia and the first petrol engine motor car built in Australia.

== History ==
Colonel Harley Tarrant built his first car in 1901. After a small number of motor vehicles were built, it became apparent that it was uneconomic to build indigenous vehicles, in the face of overseas technology. Tarrant assumed the responsibility for distribution of Ford automobiles in Victoria in 1908, and production of Tarrants ceased. The Tarrant automobile was a 2 cylinder vehicle and contained only 2 seats; the driver and the passenger.

About 16 cars were built between 1900 and 1907.

== Legacy ==
The last surviving Tarrant was acquired by the Royal Automobile Club of Victoria in 2002.

In 1984 the car was featured on a postage stamp, part of a series of five depicting early Australian automobiles, issued by Australia Post .

== See also ==
- Automotive industry in Australia
