= Puma Clubman =

Sports car

The Puma Clubman sports car was conceived and designed by John Karnon and Neville Darwin in Adelaide, Australia based on Ron Champion's book Build your own sports car for as little as £250 - and race it (ISBN 1-85960-636-9). Between 1998 and April 2014, John Karnon constructed 54 chassis and of those 30 have been completed and registered for road use. John Karnon has continued to develop the Puma chassis design to make use of more modern available donor parts.

Early Pumas were built with Nissan SR20DET S13 engines with later cars using Nissan SR20DET S14 and SR20DET S15. The S15 engine uses a six-speed gear box. Two Pumas were constructed with non-turbo SR20DE engines with one having a unique "manual automatic" gearbox. Also, two Pumas are being built with non turbo Mazda MZR2300 engines.

Puma Clubmans have won the following design and construction awards: 2005 National Rally, Bright, Vic – 1st Place, Peoples Choice: 2011 National Rally, Barossa, SA – 1st Place, Peoples Choice and 2nd Place, Individually Constructed Vehicle: 2013 National Rally, Caloundra, Qld – 1st Place, Peoples Choice and 1st Place, Kit Build Category.

In April 2014 Puma Cars relocated to Wamboin NSW after 15 years in Blackwood SA. Under the transition arrangement production of the current ‘Series 2’ chassis and components migrated to NSW in 2014 with full chassis and component production expected to be NSW based by the end of 2015. Currently chassis numbers 55 and 56 are under construction in Wamboin for customer delivery in Sept 2014–09:40, 5 May 2014 (UTC)

== Specifications ==
The engine specified by Karnon is the Nissan SR20DET or the Nissan SR20DE with donor parts from other sources. Original donor vehicles were Ford Escort Mk2, and Ford Cortina TC. Newer (series 2) Puma cars use donor parts from Holden Commodores including brakes and differential. Series 2 cars also have re-located suspension points in order to accommodate larger diameter wheels, and the seat position has also been altered in order to fit larger seats.

== Performance ==
Turbo Pumas produce between 160 and 260 kilowatts at the rear wheels and weigh about 700 kilograms. 0-100 kmh time is 3.5 seconds. Top speed is approximately 245 kmh.
