= Spartan-V =

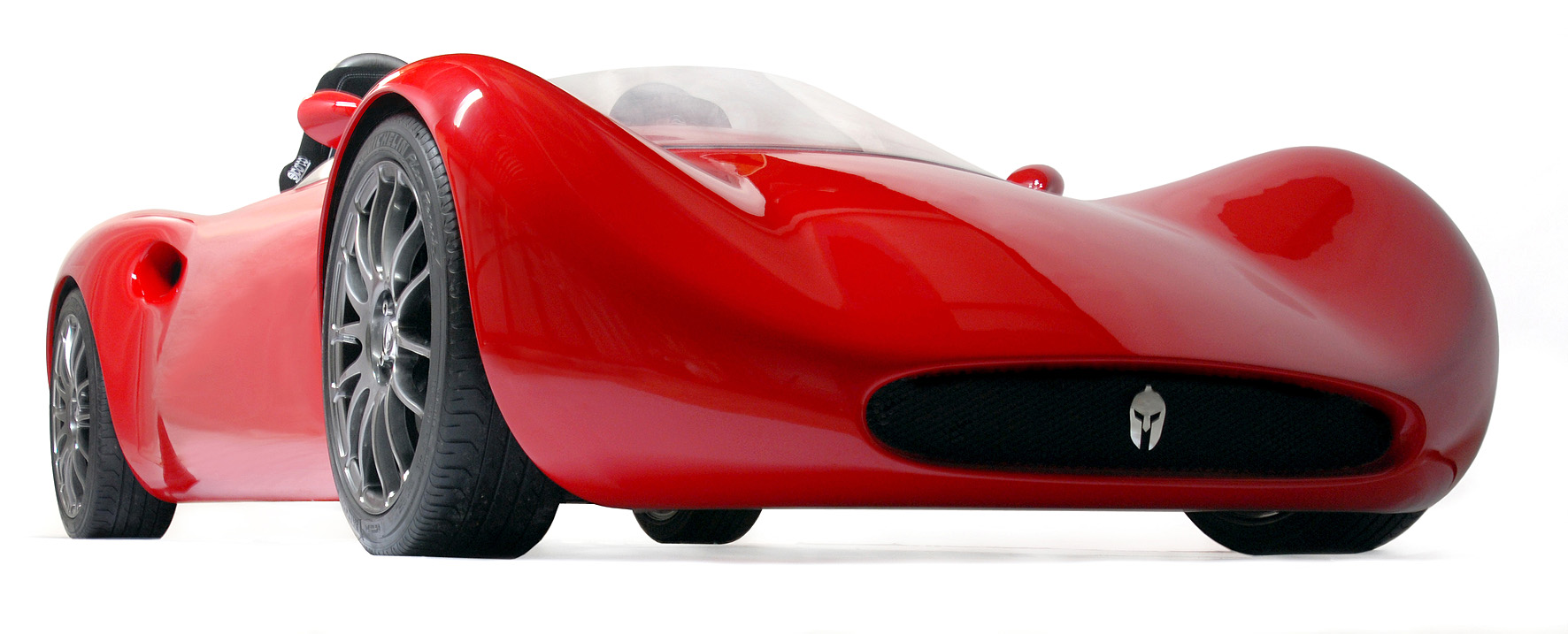

Overview
- Manufacturer: Spartan Motor Company
- Designer: Peter "Pap" Papanicolaou

Body and chassis
- Body style: Open body two-seater

Powertrain
- Engine: 1198 cc Ducati V-twin

Dimensions
- Curb weight: 660 lb (299 kg)

The Spartan-V is a high performance two-seat track car made by the Spartan Motor Company based in Sydney, Australia. It is powered by a 170 hp (127 kW) Ducati V-Twin motorcycle engine. Its name refers to the car's lack of headlights, indicators and several other essential features required by law in most countries, so is for track use only and can not be used on public roads.

== Origins ==
Twin brothers Peter and Nick Papanicolaou started work that led to the Spartan-V in 2005.

== Design ==
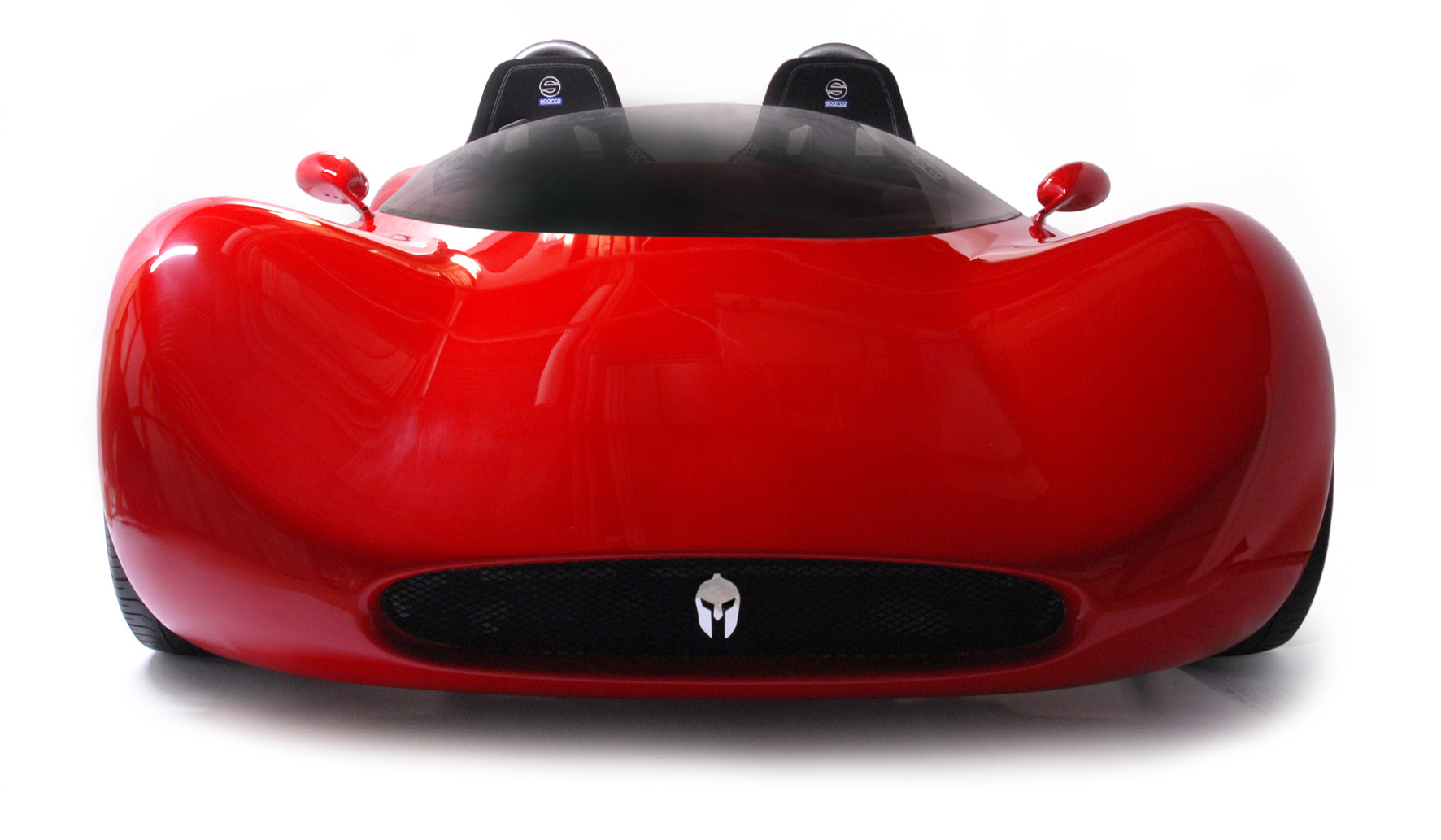
Spartan-V prototype

The Spartan-V has a tubular steel spaceframe chassis, with the engine and 6-speed sequential gearbox from a Ducati 1198S. Designed for race track use, the Spartan has two chrome roll bars which can be removed and replaced with an FIA-approved single roll bar for competition use. Ducati digital instrumentation, ventilated brake discs, a quick-ratio steering rack, and a limited-slip differential ensures that power is still applied as long there is some traction available on at least one of the wheels. The body panels are made of carbon fibre and fitted with quick-release fasteners. Suspension is double-wishbone, with adjustable racing shock absorbers.

== Performance ==
The Spartan's weight of under 300 kg (660 lb) enables acceleration to 100 km/h (62 mph) in 3 seconds and a top speed of 174 mph (280 km/h).

A limited production run of 300 cars was planned to capitalise on the connection with The 300 Spartans who fought to the last man at the Battle of Thermopylae.
