= Hammer (Australian automobile) =

Australian automobile

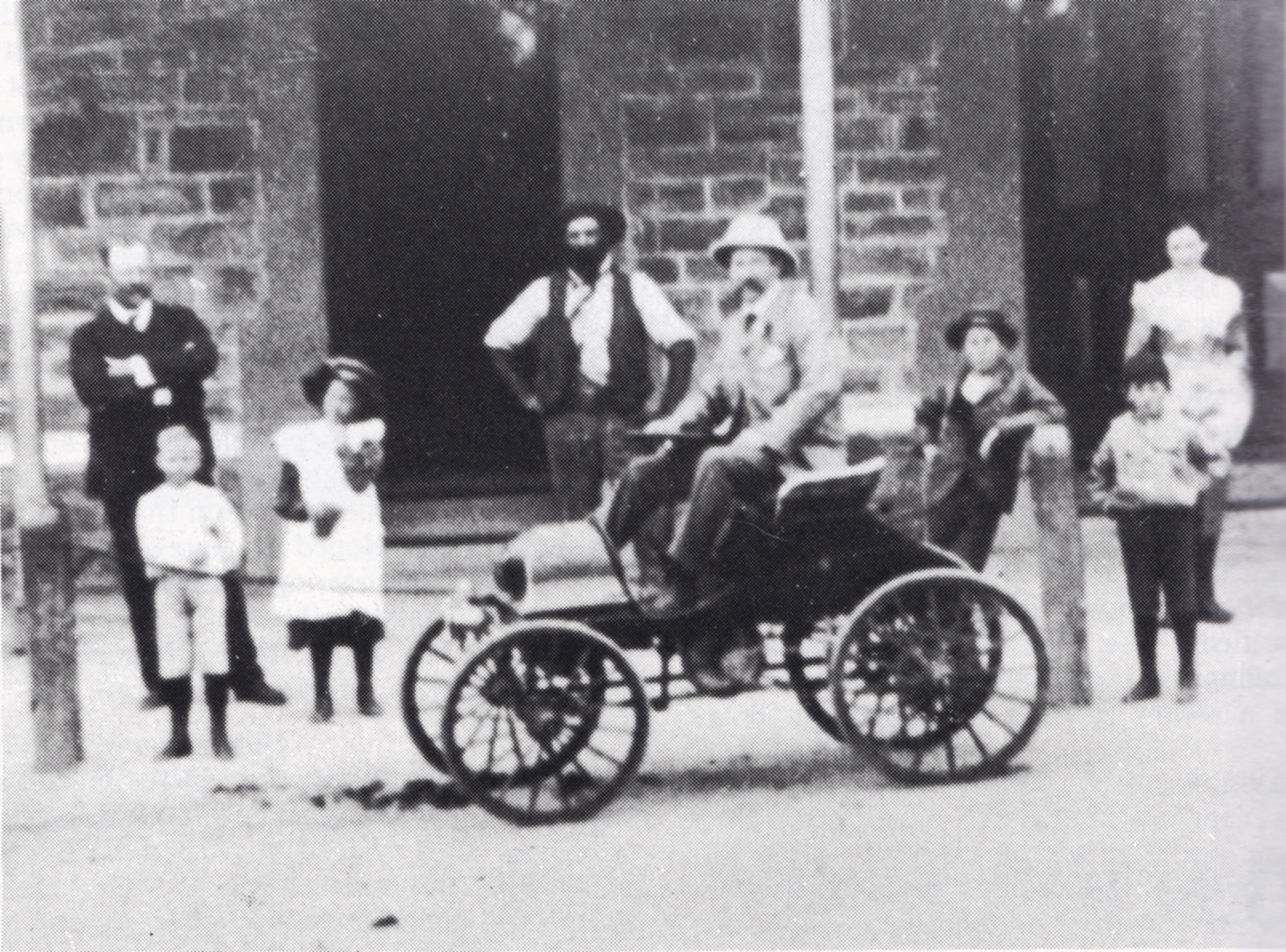
- The car in 1900

Overview
- Also called: Tung-Tung
- Production: 1900
- Assembly: Mount Torrens, South Australia
- Designer: Bruno Hammer

Body and chassis
- Body style: Phaeton
- Layout: Front-Mid Engine, RWD
- Chassis: Ladder Chassis made of wood

Powertrain
- Engine: 399.6 cc (24.4 cu in; 0.4 L) Single
- Power output: 1.9 hp (1.9 PS; 1.4 kW) @ 400 rpm 3 lb⋅ft (4.1 N⋅m) @ 100 rpm
- Transmission: Direct Drive

Dimensions
- Wheelbase: 1,500 mm (59.1 in)
- Length: 1,567 mm (61.7 in)
- Width: 790 mm (31.1 in)
- Height: 871 mm (34.3 in)
- Kerb weight: 830 lb (376.5 kg)

The Hammer was an Australian automobile built in Mount Torrens, South Australia in 1900 by bicycle mechanic and blacksmith Bruno Hammer. Hammer had never seen an automobile when he was asked to build one. He used imported drawings from Germany and built the entire vehicle himself, including the chassis, wheels, engine and carburetor, and as such the car would be heavily influenced by the Adler Vis-à-Vis. It was locally known as the "Tung-tung", due to the sound of its exhaust.

It is said to have survived until World War 1, when it was destroyed by a bush fire.
