= Bullet (car) =

1996 low-volume production car

Created by John Bettini, the first Bullet car prototype was built in 1996 utilising a Mazda MX-5 body. The chassis was designed and fabricated by Barry Pearson; it consisted of a square-tube spaceframe onto which a 13B rotary powerplant from a Mazda RX-7 was fitted.

Two more years of development saw a number of cars built; the first V8 was powered by a TVR crate engine supplied by the customer. According to CarSales it used a 4.6 litre Rover engine. Bettini decided a Toyota 4.0 litre Quadcam as used in the Soarer and Lexus SC400 would be a more desirable choice and the next production run saw four normally aspirated cars built and sold.

Sprintex, a supercharger company owned by Advanced Engine Components Ltd. (AEC) was commissioned to develop a supercharger system for the new "wide-body" model released in late 1999. AEC was so impressed with the supercharged Bullet SS that they purchased the Bullet company and set up a new manufacturing facility at Yatala in Queensland Australia.

The wider body models shared only the boot lid and doors with the Mazda MX5, with all other body panels made from fiberglass reinforced plastic that was bonded to the chassis.

AEC decided that the new Bullet Roadster and supercharged SS models should become fully Australian Design Rules (ADRs) compliant, and they invested heavily to achieve that end on 4 December 2002. All cars built from then on were classified as genuine production models and were priced at $98,000 for the Roadster and $118,000 for the SS.

Performance was significantly better than the base vehicle with the 320 kW (430 hp) engine taking the SS from zero to 100 km/h (62 mph) in less than 5 seconds. Braking and cornering were also improved due to the larger Brembo brakes and fully adjustable suspension attached to 18 × 9" wheels.

Resale values remain high with recent sales (2008) of $27,500 for an excellent 1998 Rotary, $37,500 for a 2000 Roadster and $62,000 for a pre-production supercharged SS.
