= Chic (automobile) =

Historical Australian automobile

Chic was an automobile manufactured in the Adelaide suburb of Millswood in the early 1920s. The name was a word-play on the name of the designer, Clarence Chick. Production numbers were small and only a few cars are known to have survived, including two at the Australian National Motor Museum at Birdwood in the Adelaide Hills.

Clarence (Clarrie to friends and family) was the son of a foundry owner in Clarence Park, dealing with horse & cart needs. Against the interest of the family business Clarrie started developing automobiles, his first being a converted cart using wheels & suspension from bicycles with a large spring (like a large alarm clock) that had a top speed of 8 mph with distance of 2 miles.

Clarrie was a Gunner in Field artillery in World War I (Gallipoli day 3 & France landing in Day 7) and as a Captain, developed a Field recovery unit in the Pacific during World War II.

Clarence chose the Meadows engine, manufactured in Wolverhampton, England, for the Chic. Meadows also manufactured the chassis and many of the parts. The Meadows was a real lugging engine that hung on under great load. The Meadows engine was designed as an industrial engine to power small cranes, industrial power packs & electric generators. Due to this Clarrie used very simple gear construction to achieve reduction in ratios.

The Chic was priced at £485, and Clarrie had great success with the rural community of Victoria due to the cars performance on the rough, wet Victorian tracks of the day.

Clarrie appointed the SA governor Richard Butler as president around 1924. Richard died at sea on route to England to raise capital. This event caused a panic with the other investors who rushed into the factory and took anything of value, including 27 cars (in different stages of construction). This had a major flow on effect as construction of the chassis/body was to start at Oldings Body manufacturers (we believe to be now Holden factory in SA) works in South Australia.
