= Australian Six =

Australian automobile (1919–1925)

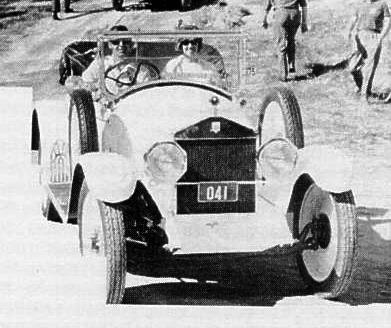
A 1919 Australian Six convertible

The Australian Six is an Australian automobile manufactured from 1919 to 1925. It was a grandiose attempt to compete against imported cars from the United States, and was produced from a mixture of local and imported parts. Vehicles featured a conventional chassis layout and a choice of five bodies, locally made under the motto 'Made in Australia, by Australians, for Australia'. Most models were fitted with Rutenber Straight-6 engines and Grant Lees or Muncie gearboxes; some, however, had imported OHV Ansted engines instead. Before 1919 the factory was at the Sydney Harbour side suburb of Rushcutters Bay, New South Wales, it then moved to Ashfield until 1924. The company was forced to shut down production after some 500 cars were built; this was due mainly to high local construction costs. The final few cars were made by the Harkness and Hillier hire car company in Sydney. Only four Australian Sixes are thought to survive, one in the Powerhouse Museum automobile collection in Sydney, one in the York Motor Museum, York, Western Australia, this is one of the first six built without a chassis number in the first factory, one in the National Museum in Canberra and one in Birdwood Museum, South Australia.

The term Australian Six (or "Big Aussie six" etc.) is sometimes used to refer to Australian-built large family cars such as the Ford Falcon, Holden Commodore/Toyota Lexcen, Toyota Avalon/Aurion, the Mitsubishi Magna/380, the Chrysler Valiant & the Leyland P76, which often have six-cylinder engines as standard.

In 1984, the car was honoured on a postage stamp, part of a series of five depicting early Australian automobiles, issued by Australia Post .

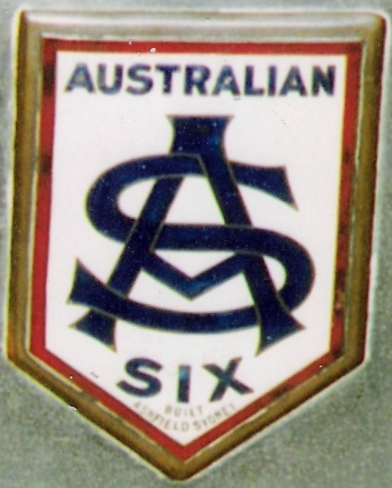
Radiator badge

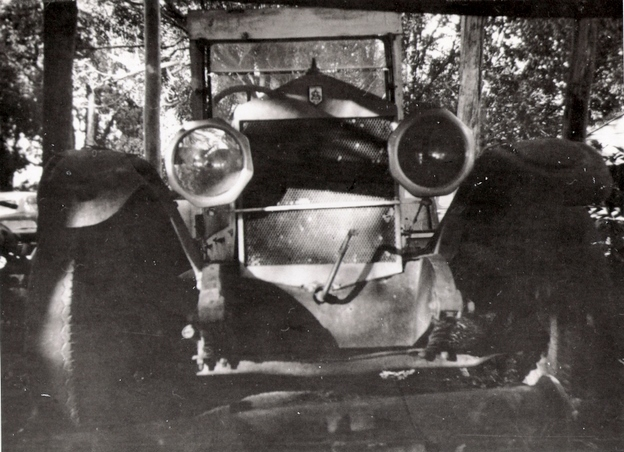
Front view of an Australian Six

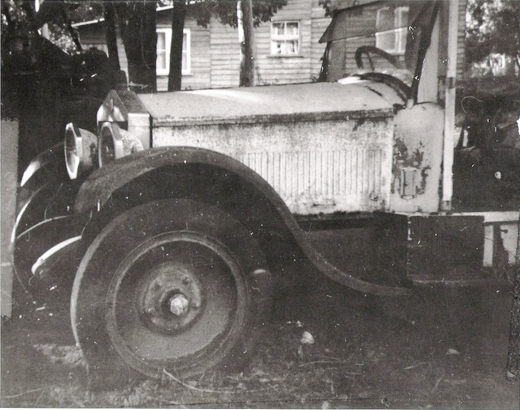
Side view
