= Caldwell Vale =

Australian transportation manufacturer

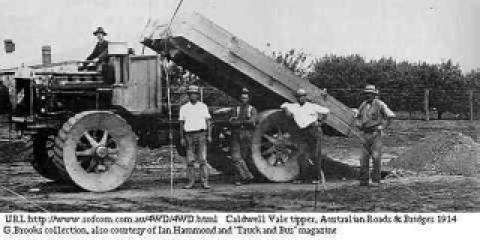
Caldwell Vale Tipper.

The Caldwell Vale Truck & Bus Co. was an Australian automobile, bus, truck and tractor manufacturer from 1907 to 1913 in the Sydney suburb of Auburn. The company started in 1907 when Felix Caldwell and Norman Laurie Caldwell of South Australia filed for a patent covering "Improvements in and connected with driving and steering motor propelled vehicles". In short, the patent was for a four-wheel-drive system with four-wheel-steering. Later they combined with Henry Vale of New South Wales and in 1910, the trio applied for a patent covering "Improved power steering gear for heavy motor driven road vehicles". Few technical details have survived about the marque and roughly 40 examples of the vehicles appear to have been made. A touring car, it is known to have had four-wheel drive, a 30 hp six-cylinder engine and four-wheel steering. The company also built a fair tractors. In 1912–13, the company lost a court case to do with the performance guarantee of the trucks and was taken over by Purcell Engineering in 1916.

A surviving example can be seen at the National Road Transport Hall of Fame in Alice Springs, Northern Territory, Australia.

Another surviving example can be seen at Booleroo Steam & Traction Preservation Society Inc It can be seen running at their yearly Rally BS&TPS Facebook Page Photo showing working at their 2018 rally - 1910 Caldwell-Vale tractor in Action

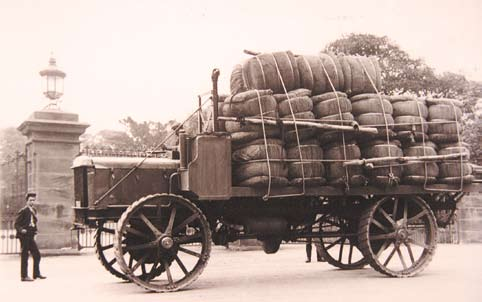
A 1910 Caldwell Vale truck loaded up with bales of wool. These models have a top speed of six miles per hour.

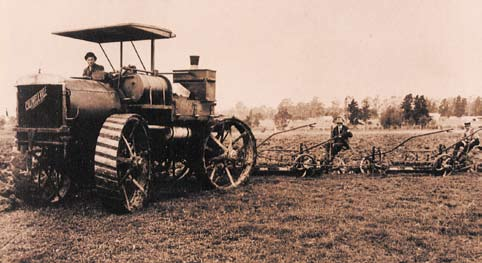
A photo of a 1910 80 hp Caldwell Vale tractor. It featured four wheel steering and an additional cooling tank mounted on the rear, suggesting that the front radiator alone was insufficient to maintain a normal working temperature for the engine.
