= Devaux Coupe =

Australian automobile

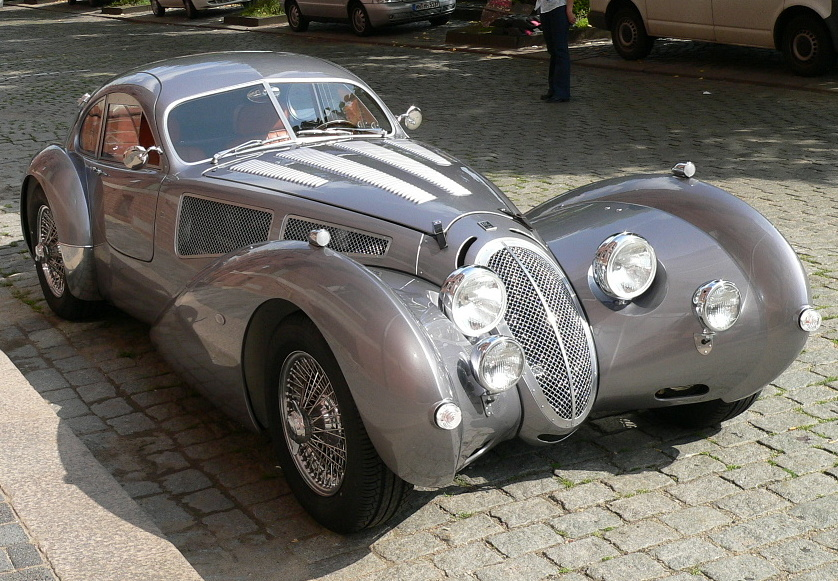

Overview
- Manufacturer: Devaux Cars Pty Ltd
- Production: 2006–present
- Designer: David J. Clash

Body and chassis
- Body style: 2-door coupé
- Layout: Front-engine, rear-wheel drive

Powertrain
- Engine: 3.4 L I6; 6.0 L LS1 V8
- Transmission: 4-speed automatic

Dimensions
- Wheelbase: 2,794 mm (110.0 in)
- Length: 4,800 mm (190 in)
- Width: 1,612 mm (63.5 in)
- Height: 1,230–1,497 mm (48.4–58.9 in)
- Kerb weight: 1,125 kg (2,480 lb)

The Devaux Coupe is an Australian automobile released by Devaux Cars Pty Ltd in 2001. It was designed by Australian David J. Clash. Devaux is named after the maiden name of his mother, who had french ancestors. The car was inspired by French of the 1930s.

It is powered by either a 3.4-litre inline-six engine or a 5.7-litre LS1 V8 engine producing 269 kW (361 bhp) and 470 N⋅m (347 lbf⋅ft) of torque.

There is also a spyder variant, and the cars are available in both left-hand or right-hand drive.
