= Pender-Hertel =

Australian manufactured card in early 20th centruy

The Pender-Hertel was an automobile built in Melbourne, Australia, in 1897. John Pender had visited Chicago in 1896 and witnessed the Chicago Times-Herald automobile race where he was impressed by a car built by Max Hertel.

After returning to Australia, Pender designed a new type of transmission and sent the details to Hertel. Hertel fitted one of his cars with Pender's transmission and shipped it to Australia. The Pender-Hertel was powered by a horizontally opposed two-cylinder engine located under the driver's seat, and had a top speed of 25 km/h.
