= Python (automobile maker) =

Australian automobile company

- Industry: Customised Automobiles
- Founded: 1981; 45 years ago
- Headquarters: Melbourne, Australia
- Key people: David Murphy; Joe "GT Joe" Imperatori

Python is a Cobra replica automobile company based in Melbourne, Australia. Founded in 1979, this company has no relation to the more widely known Python automobile created in the 1980s by Kelly Motors at Riverside, California and later at Fort Collins, Colorado.

== See also ==
- List of automobile manufacturers
- List of car brands
