= Ilinga =

Defunct Australian car manufacturer

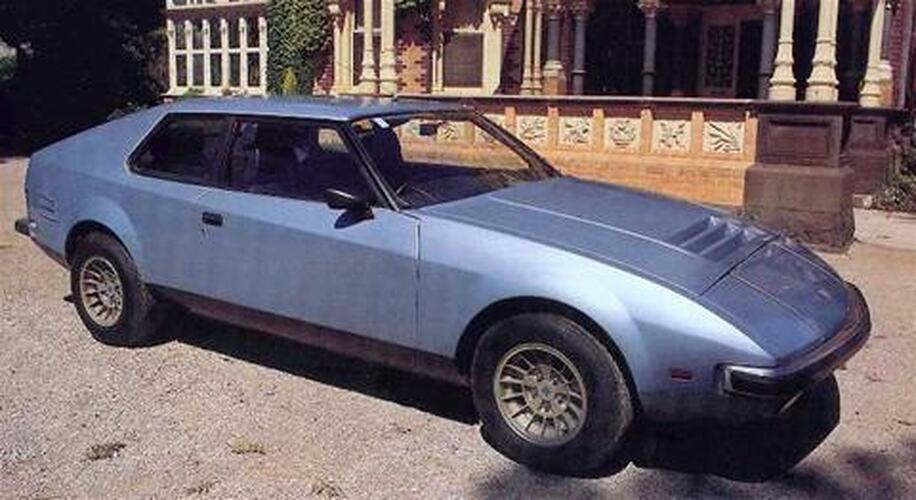
- Ilinga AF-2
- Type: Private
- Industry: Automotive
- Founded: 1974
- Founders: Tony Farrell; Daryl Davies
- Defunct: 1975
- Fate: Dissolved
- Headquarters: Melbourne, Victoria, Australia
- Products: Sports cars

Ilinga was an Australian car manufacturer founded in Melbourne by Tony Farrell and his partner, Daryl Davies, in business from 1974 to 1975.

The AF-2 was unveiled at the 1975 Melbourne Motor Show. It is a luxury two-door coupe with four seats. It featured featured a digital clock, remote locking doors, cassette player with radio, electric windows, and air conditioning. With a claimed top speed of 130 mph (209 km/h), and a kerb weight of 1,247 kg (2,750 lb).

The company only produced two prototypes of the AF-2, out of 15 orders, with one in the Museums Victoria collection. It was powered by a modified 4.4-litre Rover V8 engine from the Leyland P76, producing 164 kW (220 hp).

Plans for a four-door model in 1974 were scrapped before the factory was abandoned with broken Borg-Warner gearboxes littering the floor, as the transmission manufacturer refused to provide further assistance. US $328,000 was spent before the company finally folded after just a year in business.

The word "ilinga" is a term in a Australian Aboriginal language meaning 'towards the horizon'.

== See also ==
- List of automobile manufacturers
- List of car brands
