= Australis (automobile) =

The Australis was an Australian automobile manufactured in Leichhardt, New South Wales, from 1896 to 1906 by G.W. & G. Wood. The company began production with a motor driven bicycle in 1895. Only three Australis vehicles were produced: a second motor driven bicycle in 1896, a single-cylinder 3hp two-seat light buggy in 1900 and a 7hp (5 kW) twin-cylinder light buggy in 1906. The original engine from the 1900 Australis buggy is now part of the Powerhouse Museum collection and is thought to be the oldest surviving Australian built engine.
