= Joss JP1 =

Overview
- Manufacturer: Joss Developments
- Designer: Matthew Thomas

Body and chassis
- Class: Sports car
- Body style: 2-door coupe
- Layout: RMR layout
- Doors: Butterfly

Powertrain
- Engine: 5.0 L V8

Chronology
- Predecessor: Joss Supercar (un-named)

The Joss JP1 is a test prototype sports car developed by Joss Developments which never made production.

The first test vehicle, known as the JT1, was designed, engineered and subsequently launched in 2004. It was shown to the public at the Melbourne, Adelaide and Sydney Motorshows to critical acclaim, and established the company as a serious supercar operation. The prototype vehicles achieved performance figures in testing with an acceleration time of 0–100 km/h (62 mph) in 3.0 seconds and a quarter mile time of 11.7 seconds at 130 mph (209 km/h).

The Joss JT1 can be seen in the Xbox 360 video games PGR3 and PGR4 (although at that point no actual road-going car existed), as well as in Forza Motorsport 3, Forza Motorsport 4, and Forza Horizon.

Following feedback, additional external investment and other technological developments, the company embarked upon their mid-engined production version, internally code-named the Joss JP1. Production was set for 2013 with 25 produced each year at a price above $500,000. After investment ended in 2014, attempts were made to scale down to a race car version to compete in Targa Tasmania using crowdfunding.

As of December 2016, the JT1 is listed for sale on the carsales.com.au website.

== Design ==
Joss Developments Limited was founded by Technical Director Matthew Thomas, an automotive designer who has worked for many years around the world for companies such as Stewart Grand Prix, Bentley, Jaguar, and Aston Martin.

The early version of supercar, the JT1, had only one colour, being somewhat close to a sky blue, though the car has been photographed with its production team in white. The revised JP-1 has been seen in a number of colours as the team run through the vehicle's development.

== Joss JP1 ==
=== Performance Claims ===
- 0–100 km/h (0-62 mph): sub 3.0s
- 0–400 m (quarter mile): 11.7s
- Top Speed: 340+ km/h (211 mph)

=== Engine/Drivetrain ===
- All aluminium V8 DOHC, fuel injected
- Joss/Albins bespoke transaxle
- 350 kW (476 PS; 469 bhp)
- 572 N⋅m (422 lb⋅ft)

=== General Data ===
- Wheelbase: 2,560 mm (100.8 in)
- Length: 4,350 mm (171.3 in)
- Width: 1,860 mm (73.2 in)
- Height: 1,140 mm (44.9 in)
- Ground clearance: 110 mm (4.3 in)
- Frontal area: 1.8m2
- Curb weight: 1,050 kg (2,315 lb)

== Joss JT1 ==
=== Performance Claims ===
- 0–100 km/h (0-62 mph): 3.0s
- 0–400 m (quarter mile): 11.9 seconds @ 130 mph (209 km/h)
- Top Speed: 300 km/h (186 mph) (estimated)

=== Engine/Drivetrain ===
- 6.8L all-alloy fuel injected 16V V8
- 5 speed manual (Porsche G50), triple plate clutch
- 328 kW (446 PS; 440 bhp)
- 570 N⋅m (420 lbf⋅ft)

=== General Data ===
- Wheelbase: 2,560 mm (100.8 in)
- Length: 4,320 mm (170.1 in)
- Width: 1,840 mm (72.4 in)
- Height: 1,120 mm (44.1 in)
- Ground clearance: 120 mm (4.7 in)
- Frontal area: 1.6m2
- Curb weight: 940 kg (2,072 lb)
