= ACE EV Group =

Australian EV startup

- Industry: Automotive
- Founded: 2017; 9 years ago
- Founder: Gregory McGarvie; Will Qiang
- Headquarters: Maryborough, Queensland
- Key people: Gregory McGarvie (Managing Director)
- Website: www.aceelectricvehicles.com.au

ACE Electric Vehicle Group Pty Ltd is an Australian automobile manufacturer of electric vehicles based in Maryborough, Queensland.

== History ==
The company was founded in 2017 by Dr. Charles Kung, Gregory McGarvie, Will Qiang, and Gerhardt Kur in Maryborough, Queensland.

It was claimed that the goal was to develop the domestic production of electric cars in the form of small, city vans aimed at small entrepreneurs. The company name is an acronym from the words Australian Clean Energy Electric Vehicle, with the logo incorporating one of Australia's informal symbols, the kangaroo.

In 2018, ACE EV was awarded the MTAiQ Innovation Award in the State of Queensland, Australia

In August 2019, ACE EV unveiled plans for a complete range of electric vehicles consisting of a Cargo van and a Yewt pickup, as well as the Urban compact 3-door hatchback. Sales of vehicles on the Australian market were claimed to be expected to start in 2021.

In September 2020 it was claimed by the company that ACE EV had partnered with SenSen Networks to begin development of an Autonomous EV Solution in Australia.

In May 2023 launched the V1 Transformer van at the Smart Energy Expo in Sydney.

In May 2024 it was announced that Woolworths stores in Sydney were to use electric utes by ACE EV Group, with nine used by Woolworths by July.

== Vehicles ==
ACE Cargo prototype of an Australia Post van

- Urban
- Yewt
- Cargo
- V1 Transformer
