= Ascort =

Ascort-TSV-1300 G.T.
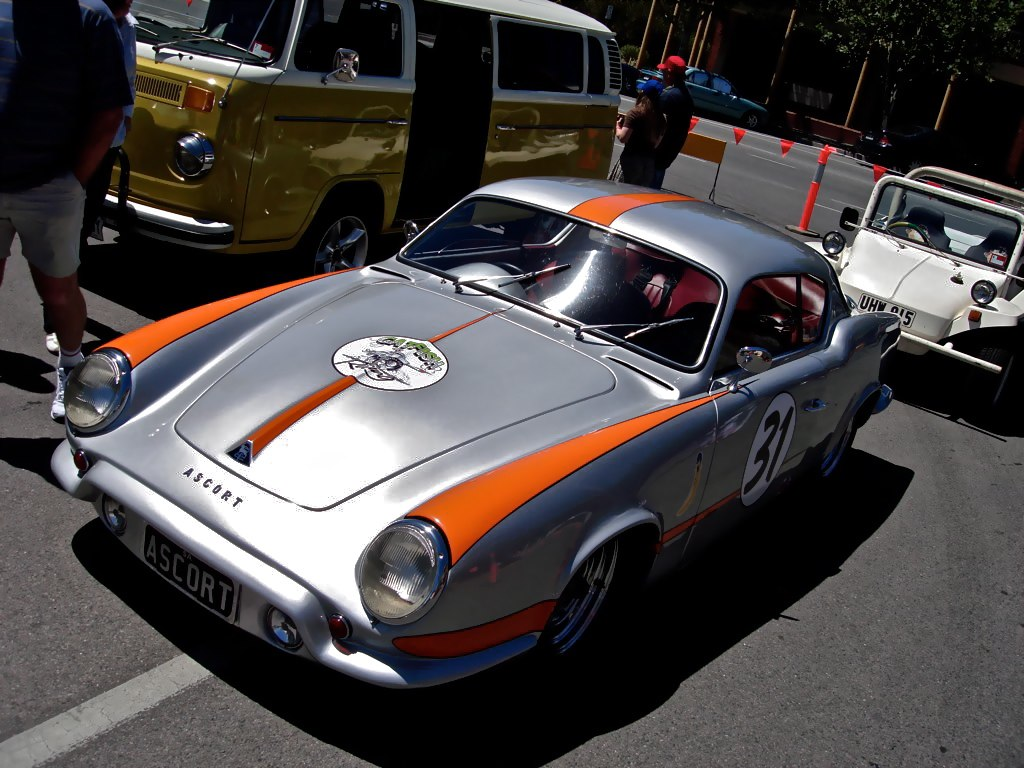
- Ascort-TSV-1300 G.T.

Overview
- Manufacturer: Continental Coachwork Pty. Ltd.
- Production: 1958-1960
- Assembly: Australia
- Designer: Mirek Craney

Body and chassis
- Body style: 2-door coupé
- Layout: Rear-engine, rear-wheel-drive

Powertrain
- Engine: 1.3 L flat-4
- Transmission: 4-speed manual

Dimensions
- Length: 169 in (430 cm)
- Curb weight: 1,467 lb (665 kg)

The Ascort was an automobile manufactured by Continental Coachwork of Sydney, Australia, from 1958 to 1960.

Designated as the Ascort-TSV-1300 G.T., it utilized a mildly modified Volkswagen chassis fitted with a four-seat coupé body which was based on that of the Volkswagen Karmann Ghia coupé, although significantly different in appearance. The body, which was constructed of fibreglass, had a prestressed double shell with a bonded-in light steel tubular frame, and was mounted on an 11-inch rubber seal. The 1.3-litre Volkswagen flat-4 engine was modified using Okrasa and Porsche components to produce 54 bhp at 4300 rpm. The vehicle's total weight was 1467 lb, 33% less than that of a standard Volkswagen Beetle sedan. The Ascort had a top speed of 96 mph and could accelerate from zero to 50 mph in 12.0 seconds.

19 cars were built before production was terminated. Although there were plans to offer the car with a 70 hp, 1500 cc engine, which would have given the car a top speed of well over 100 mph, this variant was never produced.
