= Highland (automobile) =

Early automobile in Australia

The Highland was one of the first types of automobiles to be offered for sale in Australia. Charles Highland was a Sydney bicycle dealer who imported a Daimler petrol engine in 1894 and constructed a primitive motorised tricycle. Two years later Highland and his son Charles Jnr built a four-wheeled, two-seater vehicle using bicycle components and a De Dion-Bouton engine. Replicas of this car were offered for sale in 1897 but it is not known how many were built or sold.
