= Birchfield (car) =

Birchfield Motor Company of Rockingham, Western Australia was a small Australian specialty car manufacturer, making replicas of the 1937 SS Jaguar model on individual orders. Birchfield is the continuation of earlier British Shapecraft that is known to have built 18 replicas.

After production from the Shapecraft factory ceased in the UK, a Shapecraft employee emigrated to Australia taking with him the Birchfield drawings and the last production car (#18) to use as a pattern. In 2004, at least two cars had been completed in Australia and two more were in production.

== See also ==
- List of automobile manufacturers
- List of car brands
