= Automotive industry in the Philippines =

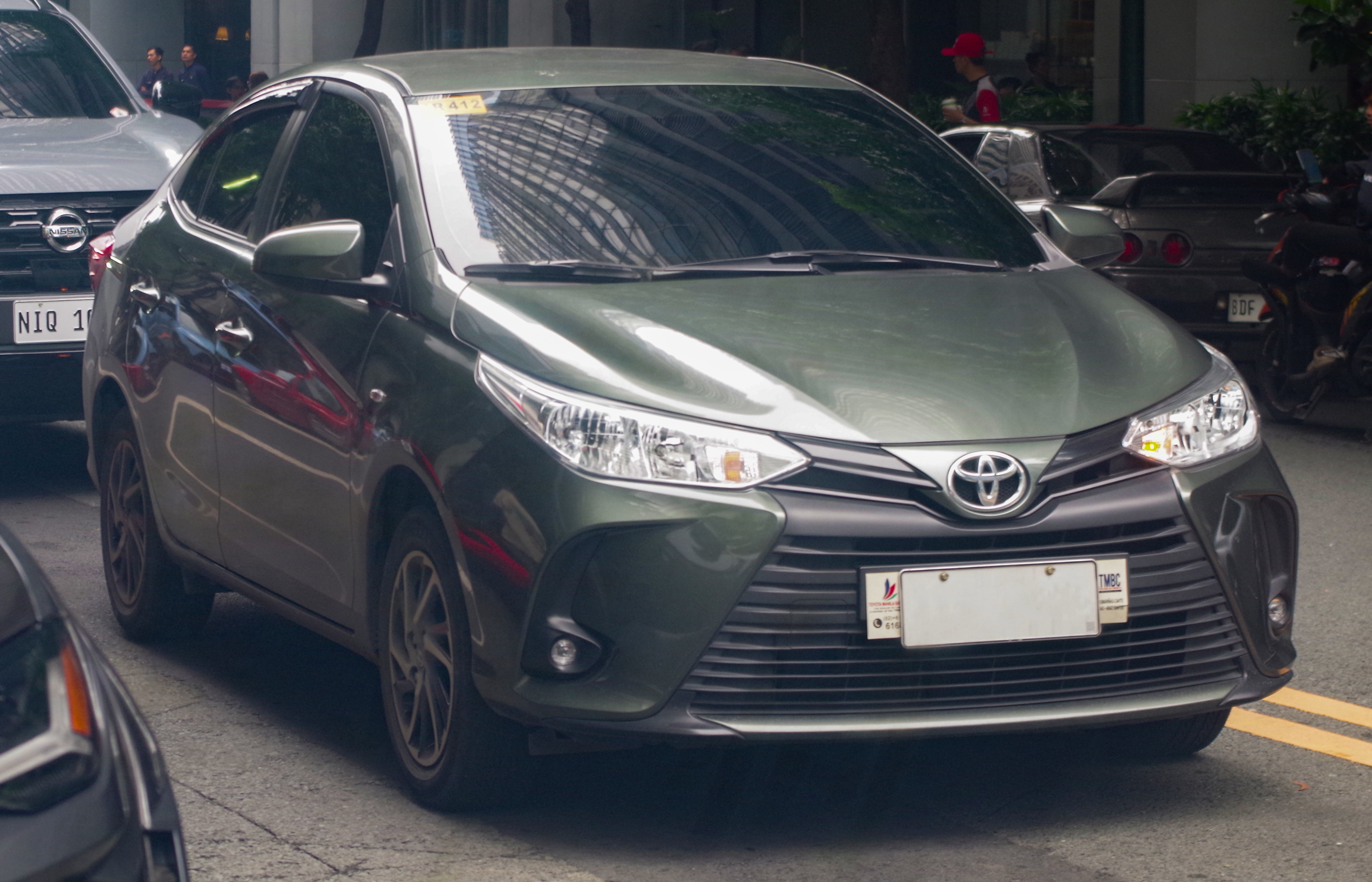
The Toyota Vios was the best-selling car in the Philippines from 2008 until 2016, and again from 2018 to 2024.

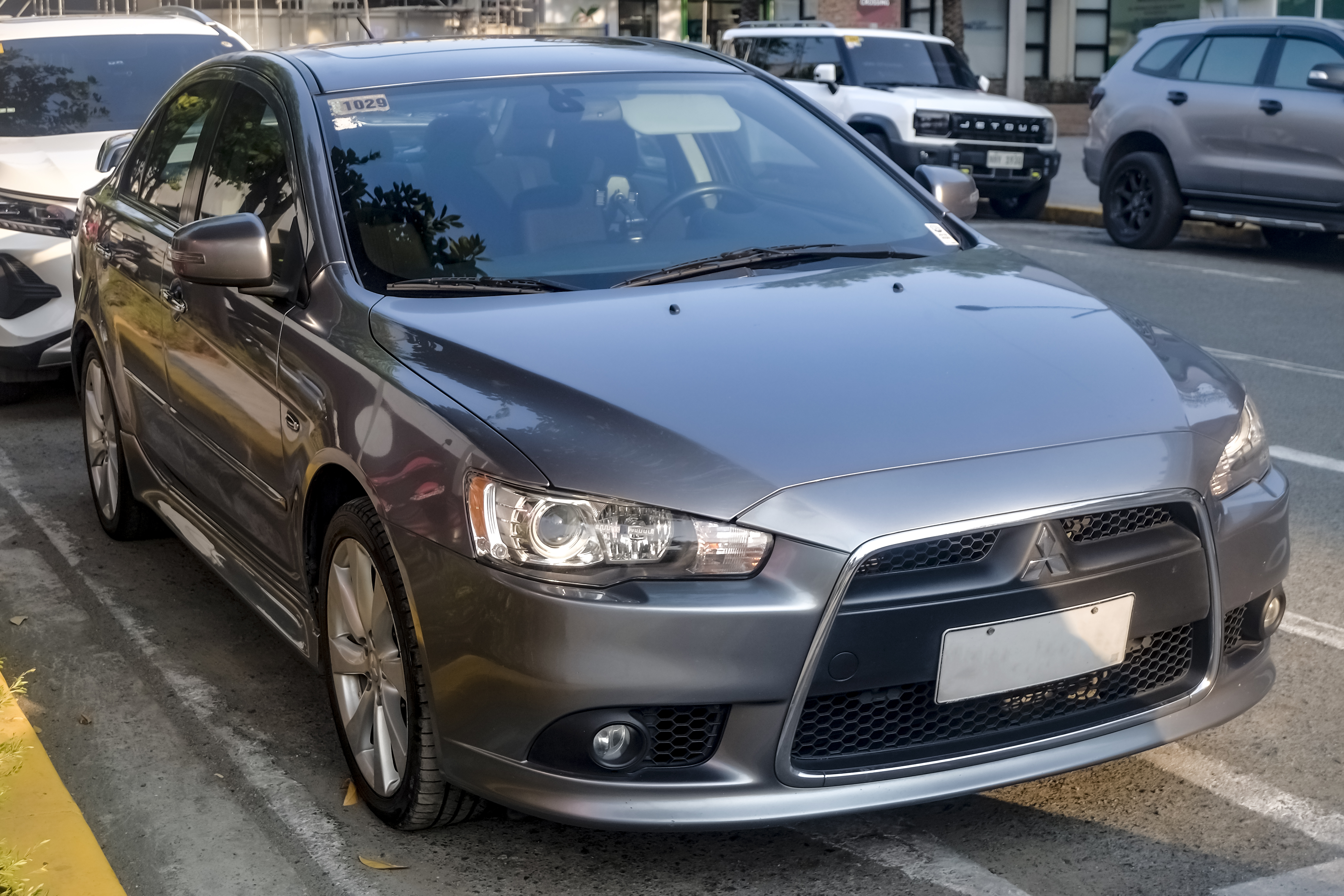
The Mitsubishi Lancer was considered an automotive icon in the country, having been built in the country since the first generation up until its last generation in 2017.

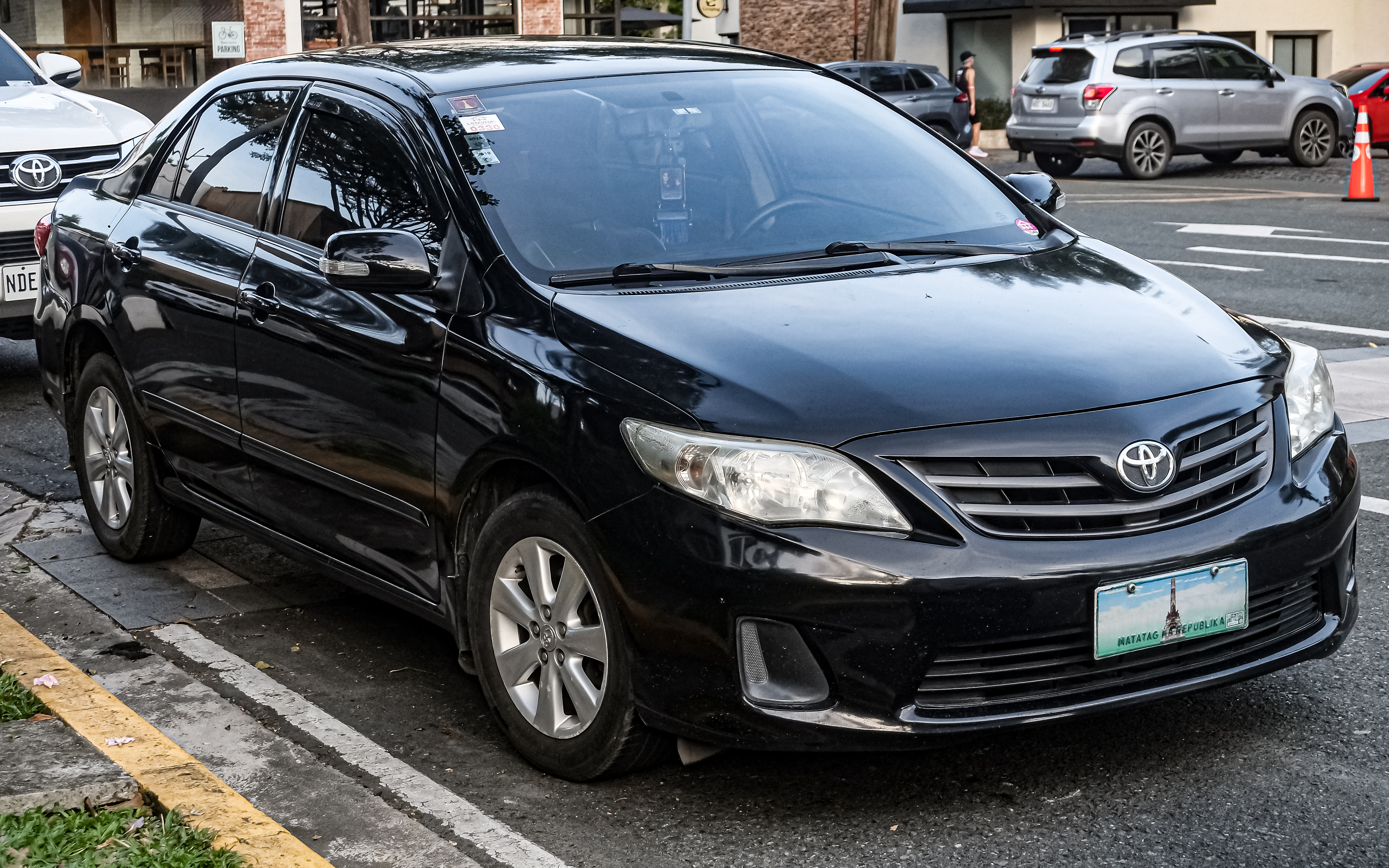
The Toyota Corolla was considered a pioneer of the Philippine automotive industry, and it was also the country's best-selling car until 1998.

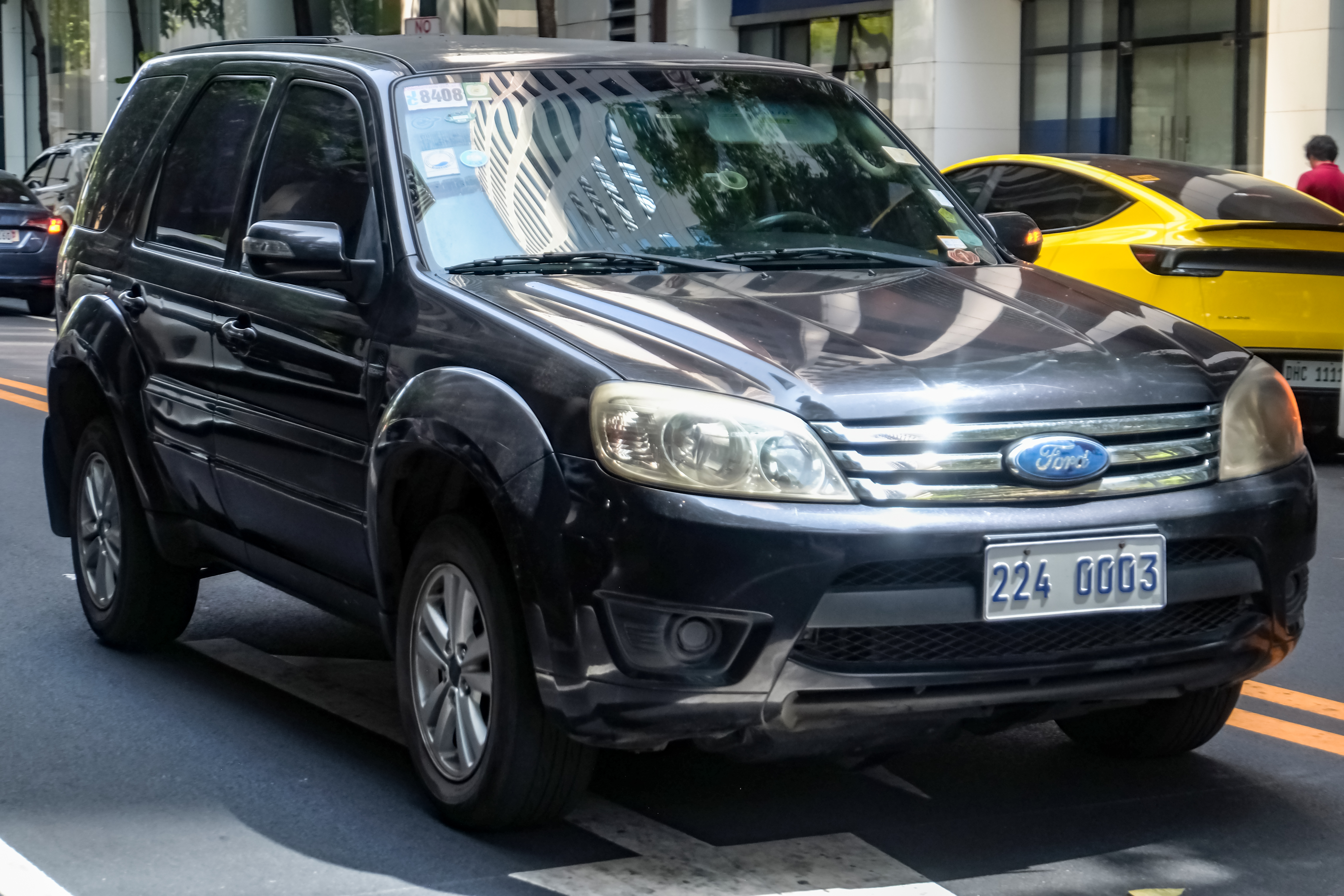
The Ford Escape was one of the last locally-built cars by Ford that were exported to other countries. Since then, most Philippine manufacturing facilities only serve the domestic market. The Escape would reappear in 2015 as a direct import from the United States.

The automotive industry in the Philippines is one of the largest in the Asia-Pacific region, with approximately 441.4 thousand vehicles sold in 2023. Most of the vehicles sold and built in the Philippines are from foreign brands.

For the most part, the Philippines is dominated by Japanese automobile manufacturers, like most of its ASEAN neighbors. Automobile production is upheld by the Philippine Motor Vehicle Development Program implemented by the Board of Investments. In addition, there are also a small number of independent firms that assemble and fabricate jeepneys and other similar vehicles, using surplus engines and drivetrain parts mostly from Japan.

The Philippine automobile industry consists of two sectors: motor vehicle assembly and vehicle parts manufacturing. The country also has active premium vehicle and commercial vehicle markets.

Automobile sales in the Philippines mostly consist of locally assembled and imported cars, notably from Thailand, Indonesia, and other such countries. In 2019, an imported vehicle coming from Indonesia cost 24 percent less than a locally made equivalent. The same cost difference applies to completely built-up cars from South Korea (also 24 percent) and Thailand (18 percent). The country also imports cars from China, India, and the United States.

== History ==
The Philippine automobile industry started during the American colonial period from 1898 to 1946. Cars and motorcycles were introduced around 1901 and made available in the country by trading companies. The general population was accustomed to animal-drawn vehicles; initially, only the wealthy could afford to buy and own these newly introduced automobiles. In those days, it took at least three months to ship a car from Europe or the US to Manila.

Dr. Juan Miciano is acknowledged as the first Filipino to buy and operate a motor vehicle—a French-made Richard-Brasier which he bought in 1901 according to a 1910 motor car directory. Prior to that, the US Army Signal Corps had in December 1900 brought a number of Woods electric cars into the country for military use only. It marked the early appearance of motor cars in the country.

In 1931, the Automobile Association Philippines (AAP), the country's largest and oldest car club, was born as the Philippine Motor Association (PMA), a non-stock corporation and nonprofit organization. The PMA was founded by Jorge B. Vargas, Carlos P. Romulo and Albino SyCip. In 1951–1952, it became an affiliate of the Alliance Internationale de Tourisme and Fédération Internationale de l'Automobile. In 1953, Philippine President Elpidio Quirino officially named it the National Auto Club. In 1963, it was authorized to issue the Philippine International Driving Permit. The PMA's first office was located at the Manila Hotel; in 1937, it relocated to the Legarda-Hermanos buildings in Quiapo, Manila. In the 1980s, it relocated to AAP Tower at 683 Aurora Boulevard in Quezon City. Currently, it is led by President Augustus V. Ferreria and Vice President David L. Arcenas.

During the early days of the Filipino automobile industry, American-made marques such as Mercury, Buick, Chevrolet, Ford, and Dodge dominated the market from the 1920s through the early 1970s. The country pioneered the establishment of automotive assembly in the Southeast Asian region. An import substitution policy introduced in the 1950s led to a ban on fully-built vehicle imports, which was later replaced by high tariffs from 1951 until 1972.

American- and European-made cars were a common sight on the country's road by the 1960s. In that same decade, Japanese-made cars were introduced to the market. The Philippine auto industry was at the forefront of the Southeast Asian auto industry during that period. By the mid-1960s, fuel economy and practicality became important criteria for a growing number of car buyers in the country, which the Japanese car manufacturers were best equipped to serve. Consequently, General Motors (among other American manufacturers) utilized its European and Australian subsidiaries, Vauxhall and Holden, to introduce mid-size and compact cars to compete with Japanese marques in the expanding market.

=== Localization ===
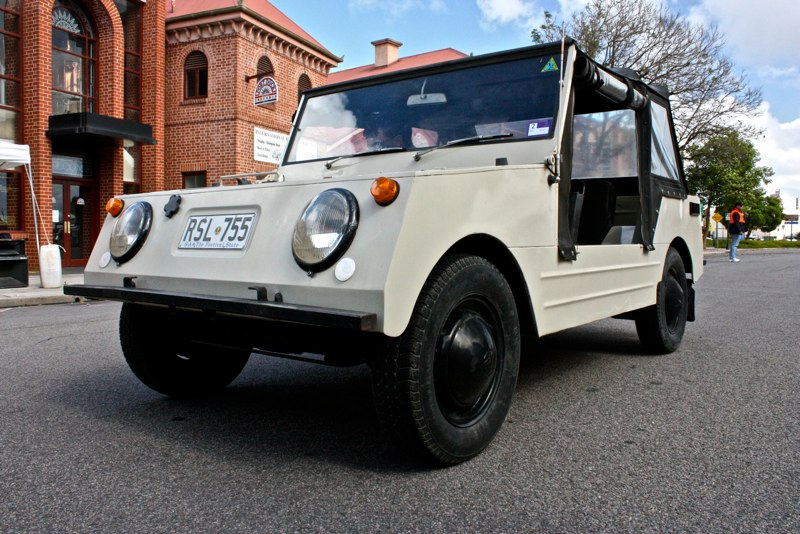
Volkswagen Sakbayan

In the 1970s, local production of automobiles in the Philippines began in 1975 with mostly passenger cars and some commercial vehicles. During the 1973 oil crisis, then-President Ferdinand Marcos advised Filipinos to buy smaller, more efficient vehicles with four-cylinder engines. Demand for American-style full-size sedans subsequently fell in favor of smaller, more economical cars. By the mid-70s, the popularity of full-sized American cars had quickly dwindled and the compact, subcompact, and some mid-sized cars have quickly become popular ever since then.

In 1973, the government instituted the Progressive Car Manufacturing Program (PCMP), a system with scheduled increases in local parts content requirement, which also allowed program participants to import a certain proportion of completely built-up vehicles. The original participants were General Motors, Ford, PAMCOR (Philippine Automotive Manufacturing Corporation, a Chrysler/Mitsubishi joint venture), Delta Motors Corporation (Toyota), and DMG Motors (Volkswagen). DMG attempted to domestically produce a "national car", the Country Buggy-based Sakbayan (a portmanteau of sasakyang katutubong bayan, "original national vehicle"), as well as the Trakbayan light truck. This project, however, did not last long.

During the 1980s, Japanese and some European marques dominated the Philippine market. However, by 1985, following the political and economic turmoil that worsened with the assassination of opposition politician Ninoy Aquino, several car manufacturers left the Philippine market. Cars like the Nissan Stanza and Mitsubishi Lancer were the only choice left for new car buyers, while most people drove older cars, resulting in a drastic nationwide industry downturn. In this era, Thailand would gain a reputation as the "Detroit of Southeast Asia", with their industry currently ranking 1st in Southeast Asia and 12th globally.

=== After Marcos ===
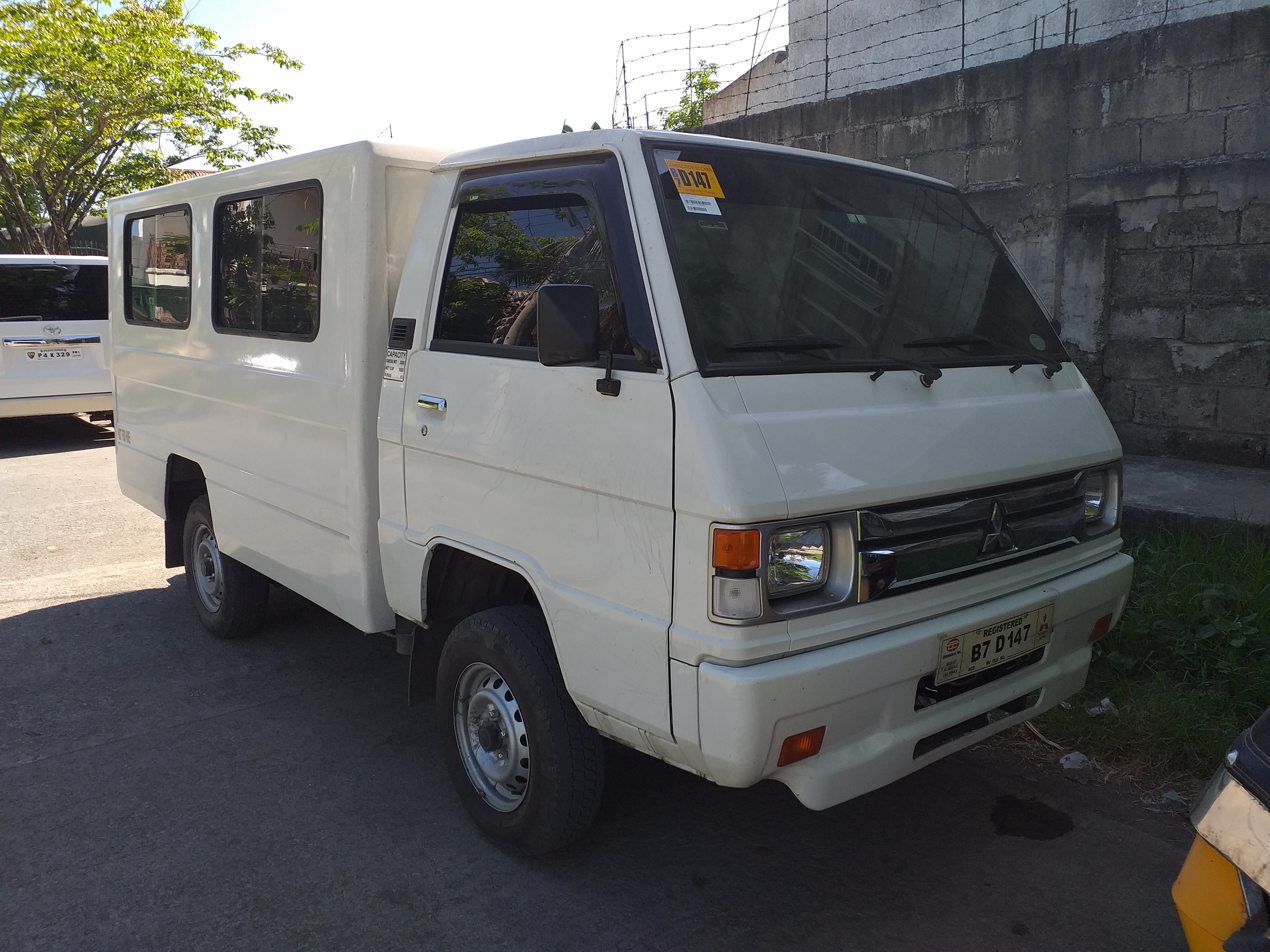
The Mitsubishi L300 has the longest vehicle production run in the Philippines under a single generation. Production started in 1987, and again in 2019.

The original PCMP members—Toyota, Mitsubishi, and Nissan—resumed business operations in the Philippines in 1988 after the People Power Revolution ousted Marcos in 1986, and eventually, no less than 13 manufacturers vied for a market limited to around 100,000 cars per year. With the recovery of the country's economy from the 1980s until the mid-1990s, the automotive industry followed suit, with local vehicle manufacturers hitting 138,000 units in 1996. This figure is 85 percent of the domestic vehicle sales of the period.

During the 1997 Asian financial crisis, several makers withdrew as sales tanked, becoming de facto completely built up (CBU) importers rather than assemblers. Since 1998, the Philippine automotive manufacturing policy has been in a flux, undermined by the abundance of lightly used cars from Japan and South Korea.

A new tax reform program in 2002 undermined local assembly further by lowering sales taxes on the cheapest microcars sold in the country, most of which were imported from other ASEAN countries or China. Meanwhile, the popular locally assembled Asian utility vehicles (AUVs) with high Philippine parts content were hit with considerable sales tax increases due to their larger engines and higher upfront prices. Total industry sales plummeted to five digits annually from 1998 to 2006. In 2007, car sales in the Philippines began to climb to pre-crisis levels, during which total sales reached 144,435 units. Production of completely knocked down (CKD) cars remained stagnant after the 1997–1998 economic crisis, and since 2008, CBU imports have outnumbered locally assembled cars.

The 2010s saw the arrival of new car brands and models to the Philippines. From 2015 onwards, the country's automobile market began progressing, before again struggling due to the COVID-19 pandemic. Even before the pandemic, sales were greatly affected by the 2020 Taal Volcano eruption. Although sales are recovering, monthly average sales are still significantly below pre-pandemic figures.

== Government programs ==
=== Progressive Car Manufacturing Program ===
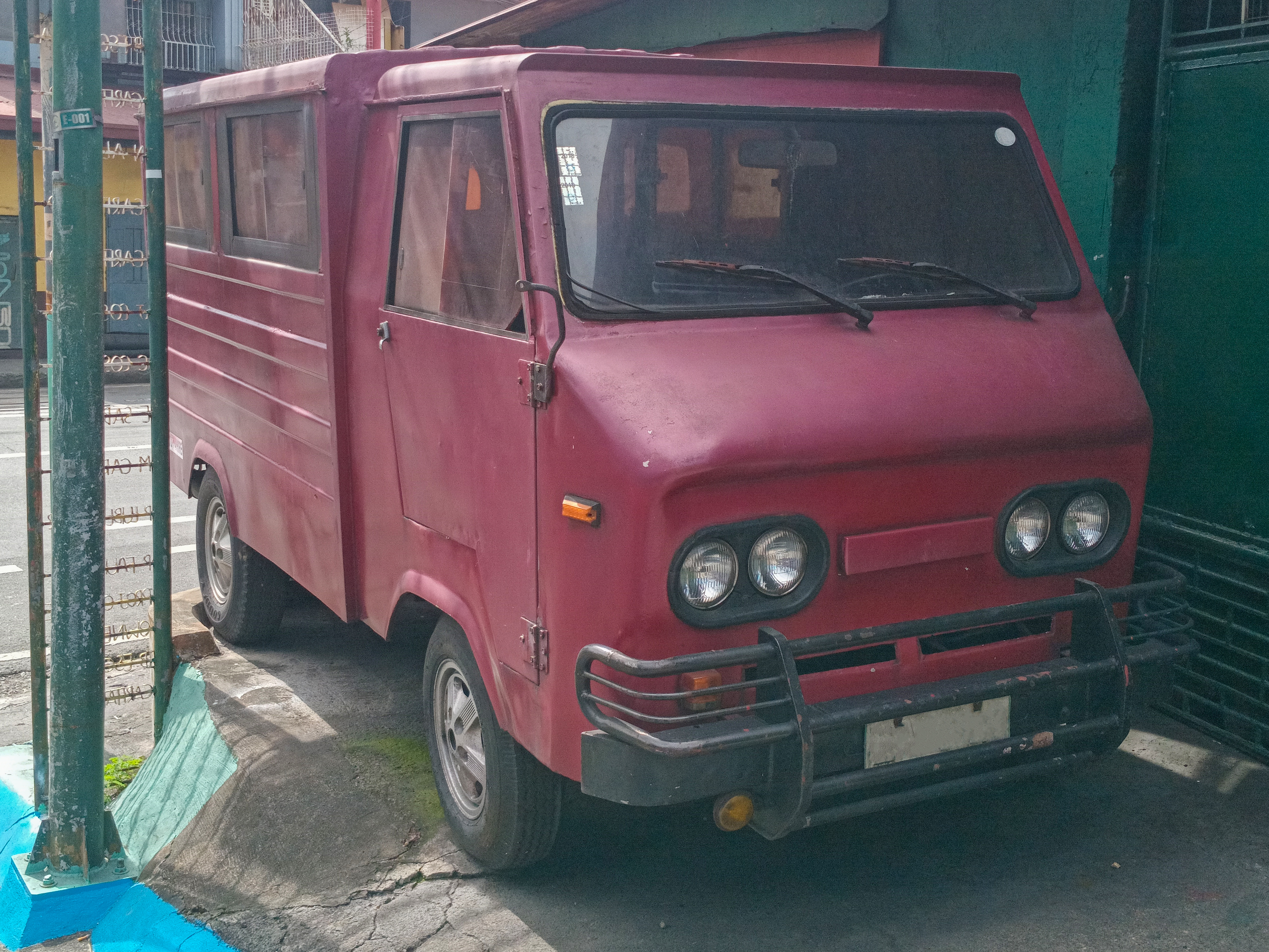
The Mitsubishi Cimmaron HPR (high side pickup with roof) is the predecessor to the Mitsubishi L300 FB. It used the 1.4-litre 4G41 engine, mated to a column-shifted 4-speed synchromesh manual transmission. Rarely seen on the road these days, it can still be seen in provinces as a jeepney.

In 1973, President Ferdinand Marcos signed the Progressive Car Manufacturing Program (PCMP). Initially, four car manufacturers were chosen to be part of the program, but Ford Motor Company was determined not to be left out. Ford proposed to the government that, if included, it would provide a stamping plant. After an 11-hour proposal, the deal was settled and PCMP ended being a five-participant venture. The program consisted of Delta Motors Corporation (Toyota), General Motors Pilipinas, Ford Philippines, DMG, and PAMCOR (Mitsubishi and Chrysler).

Each of the five PCMP participants was spurred to produce an affordable AUV completely from local materials, designed for local needs. To simplify tooling and repairs, all of the AUVs' body parts were flat stamped, with no compound curves. The most successful of the AUVs in the Philippines were the Toyota Tamaraw and Ford Fiera. Ford and Toyota combined common chassis cabs with different upfits for specific lines of work, such as farming and fishing. To reach affordability goals, Ford prepared project studies for varied uses and entered a financial arrangement with Citibank to give additional consideration if the applicant would follow the project study.

The other remaining three car manufacturers that were part of the PCMP program made their own AUV to compete in the local market. These included the Mitsubishi Cimmaron (which was largely replaced by the Mitsubishi L300 in the Philippines), DMG/Volkswagen Sakbayan, GM Harabas, Isuzu KC20, and Nissan Bida. The Bida was designed as a fourth-generation Ford Fiera, but as a result of Ford leaving the market in 1984, Nissan bought the rights to the design and sold it as a Nissan. Delta/Toyota also developed a local SUV mainly for military use, the Delta Mini Cruiser.

After the early 1980s financial collapse, 3 PCMP members withdrew, leaving only Nissan and Mitsubishi. The program was considered to be a failure, as stated by then-Prime Minister Cesar Virata. He admitted that since 1975, not one of the five participants in the PCMP had produced a car that could be considered "Made in the Philippines." For example, the Ford Fiera was assembled at Ford Lio Ho Motor in Taiwan, while the Toyota Tamaraw was of Indonesian origin.

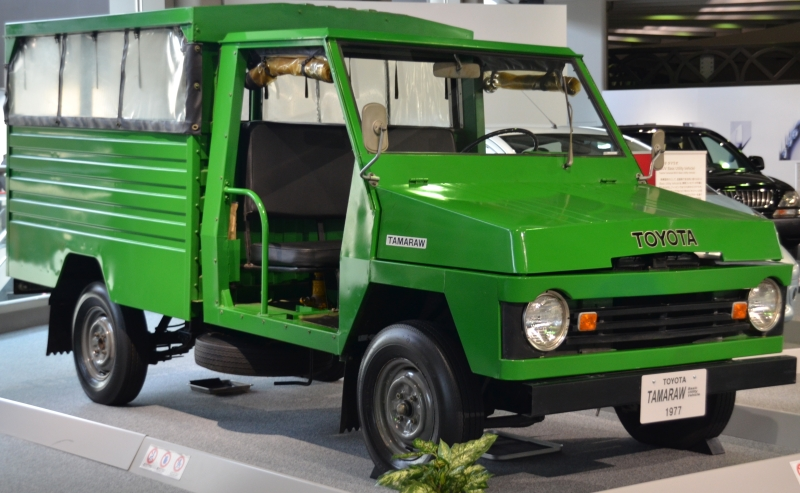
Toyota Tamaraw

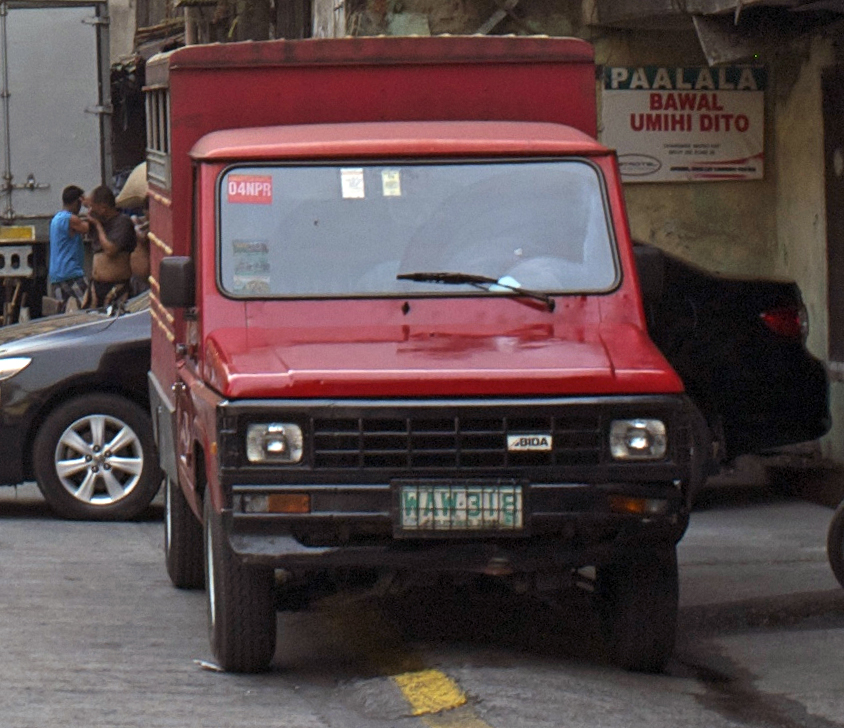
Nissan Bida

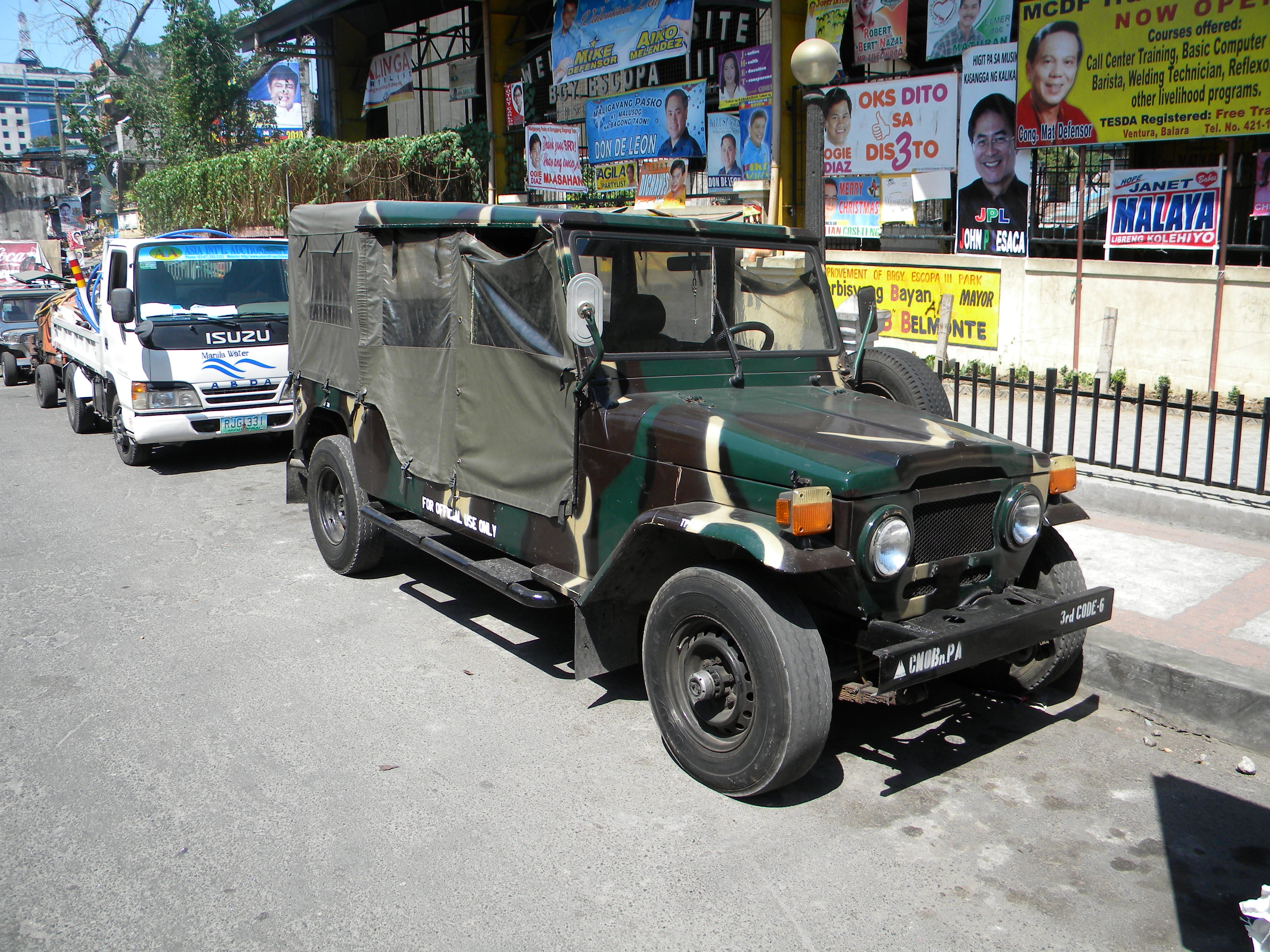
Delta Mini Cruiser

=== Car Development Program (CDP) ===
In 1987, the PCMP was replaced by the new Car Development Program (CDP) with lower local parts requirements. The original participants of the program were Mitsubishi, Nissan, and Toyota, who built domestic assembly plants as per the program. In 1990, the addition of the People's Car Program to the CDP paved the way for the entry of new manufacturers such as Honda, Kia, Fiat, and later Proton. Honda locally assembled the Accord, Civic, and CR-V, Fiat assembled the Uno, Kia assembled the Pride, and Proton assembled the Wira and a couple of Volkswagen vehicles for the local market. A Luxury Car Program was also added in 1992 as part of the CDP amendment. It saw the entry of Volvo and BMW, and the re-introduction of Mercedes-Benz. The Volvo 850 and BMW 3 Series (E36) were assembled in the country for a time in the form of semi-knocked down (SKD) kits.

=== Public Utility Vehicle Modernization Program (PUVMP) ===
The Public Utility Vehicle Modernization Program was launched by the Department of Transportation in 2017, with the goal of making the country's public transportation system efficient and environmentally friendly by 2020. The program features ten components, which include regulatory reform, route planning, route rationalization, fleet modernization, industry consolidation, financing, pilot implementation, stakeholder support mechanisms, and communication. The program calls for the phasing-out of jeepneys, buses, and other public utility vehicles (PUVs) that are at least 15 years old and replacing them with safer, more comfortable, and more environmentally-friendly alternatives over the next three years. Manufacturers like Fuso, Hyundai, Isuzu, Hino, Mahindra and Russian brand GAZ have participated to build modern PUVs based on their existing van, truck and bus lineups to replace aging jeepneys.

=== Comprehensive Automotive Resurgence Strategy (CARS) program ===
The CARS program was implemented by the Department of Trade and Industry in order to encourage new car companies to produce vehicles in the Philippines, stimulate demand, impose industry regulations to restore the country's automotive industry, make the country a regional automotive manufacturing hub, and create more jobs in the country. The program was considered unsuccessful, since most car manufacturers see the Philippines as an importer rather than an exporter. Automakers would generally build assembly plants in Thailand, Indonesia, Malaysia, Vietnam, and China owing to lower corporate taxes, operating costs, and minimum wages. There are more major parts suppliers with facilities in these countries, making importing parts from the Philippines unnecessary.

So far, only two Japanese car manufacturers, Mitsubishi and Toyota, have taken part in the program. The program was intended for three manufacturers, but no other automaker has taken up the third position. Mitsubishi was approved as a CARS program participant in 2016 and announced the local production of the Mirage and Mirage G4 in 2017. Toyota Motor Philippines has been manufacturing the Toyota Vios since 2007 and enrolled the facelifted Yaris ATIV-based Vios to be locally manufactured. Both manufacturers have a production target of 200,000 vehicles within 6 years.

Prices of cars imported from Indonesia or Thailand have been reported to be much lower compared to a locally assembled car, as unlike Thailand, the Philippines did not impose tax incentives on locally built cars until the CARS program. In 2019, 4 out of every 5 cars sold were CBU imports, and only about 20% of vehicles were locally assembled. Ford closed their Philippine assembly plant in 2012, followed by Honda in 2020 and Nissan in 2021, while Isuzu ceased local production of their D-Max in 2019.

=== Safeguard Measures Act ===
In 2021, the Department of Trade and Industry enacted laws on automobile import safeguards in a bid to protect the domestic automobile business. These laws were in response to the petition filed by the Metal Workers Alliance of the Philippines asking for safeguard measures against the dominance of fully imported automobiles. Many car manufacturers have shown concern that import tariffs would hurt the local car industry, as it relies heavily on imported cars from other countries. Exemptions are granted for locally assembled vehicles, vans and commercial vehicles with a seating capacity of over 10, electric vehicles, and most luxury cars. DTI Secretary Ramon Lopez announced that the country would start imposing a 70,000 PHP ($1,460) tariff on passenger cars and a 110,000 PHP ($2,262) tariff on light commercial vehicles. Cars from Thailand, the US, Japan, and Europe are subject to these tariffs, though cars from some countries like China, South Korea, Malaysia, and parts of Indonesia are exempt.

However, on August 6, 2021, the imposition of safeguard duty on imported vehicles was suspended, as the Tariff Commission determined that there was no surge in complete vehicle imports. Given that completely built passenger cars and light commercial vehicles were not imported in greater quantities during the investigation period, the Commission closed its formal investigation and recommended that no safeguard measure be imposed on imports of CBU passenger cars, and light commercial vehicles under examination will not face any definitive general safeguard measures. Once the order is published, it will be transmitted to the Department of Finance, which will then direct the Bureau of Customs to lift the DTI's safeguard measures. The decision to lift the DTI's safeguard restrictions on imported cars, which account for the vast majority of vehicles sold in the Philippines, has been expected to significantly help the industry recover. While the implementation is waiting for full effect, car dealerships across the country will return cash deposits paid by consumers who purchased imported vehicles during that time period.

== Active manufacturers ==
Notable Filipino vehicle manufacturers include Sarao Motors and Francisco Motors Corporation.

As of February 2021, there are 58 official car brands in the country.

=== BMW ===
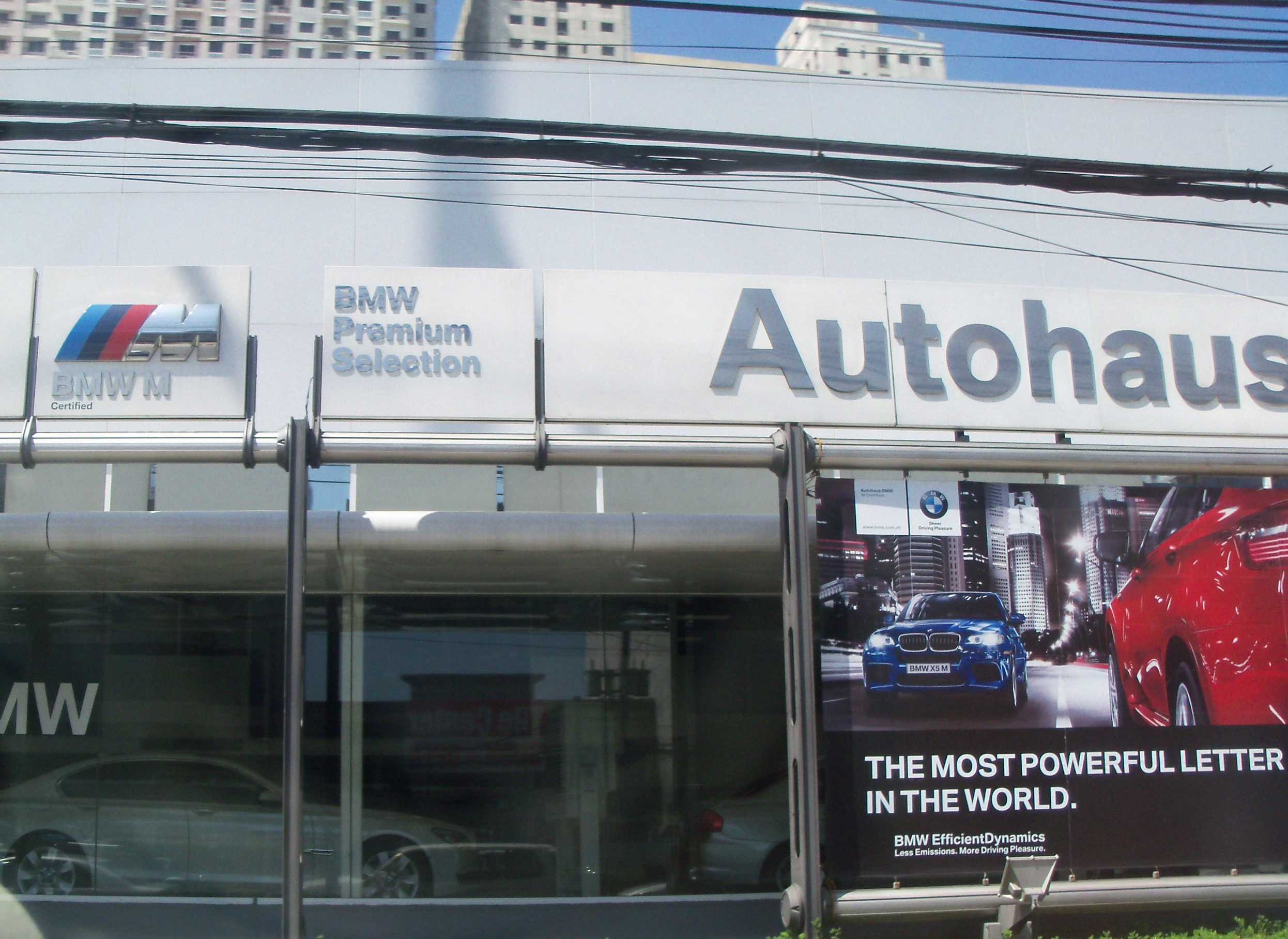
A BMW dealership in the Philippines.

Between 1994 and 1997, the BMW 3 Series (E36) was assembled locally in the form of SKD kits. BMW Philippines is currently an owned subsidiary of San Miguel Corporation, and is the official importer and distributor of BMW vehicles in the country.

=== Ford ===
Ford's history in the Philippines can be traced back to 1929. Ford Philippines, Inc. (FPI) was established as a subsidiary of the Ford Motor Company in 1967 and began production operations on May 3, 1968. Ford left the market in 1984 due to the local economic recession, returning in 1997 as Ford Group Philippines, Inc. (FGPI). Ford built a manufacturing plant that opened in September 1999. During its lifetime, the plant produced both Ford and Mazda products like the Ford Lynx, Ford Escape/Mazda Tribute, Ford Focus, Mazda3, and the Mazda-based Ford Ranger, not only for the local market but also neighboring countries such as Indonesia, Vietnam, Thailand, Malaysia, and Singapore. The plant closed down in 2012. Since then, Ford Group Philippines imports its vehicles, mostly from Thailand and the United States.

Ford Philippines also used to sell Lincoln cars in the Philippines. Their former plant in Santa Rosa, Laguna is now owned by Mitsubishi Motors Philippines.

=== General Motors ===
Chevrolet’s operation in the country is currently under the control of The Covenant Car Company, Inc. (TCCCI). GM entered a partnership with TCCCI, appointed by GM Southeast Asia as an independent and exclusive importer and distributor of Chevrolet automobiles and parts in the country. TCCCI was officially incorporated on July 1, 2009, and assumed business operations on October 1 that year. They launched GM Philippines, Inc. on December 1, 2014. Most of the cars in Chevrolet's lineup were imported from Thailand, the US, and South Korea. Prior to that, Yutivo Corporation was responsible for the production and manufacturing of General Motors products in the country. Originally founded in 1887, Yutivo was in charge of assembling Chevrolet, Opel, Holden, Vauxhall, Buick, and Isuzu cars and trucks for the country. They became a spare parts distributor for General Motors in the country back in 1940. Yutivo started assembly operations in 1953 and stayed in business until 1976.

General Motors also built two AUVs in the Philippines, the GM Amigo/Tiger and the GM Harabas. These used the underpinnings of the Bedford HA and a 1256 cc Vauxhall inline-four engine. The Harabas was a four-door station wagon (mainly used as a taxi) and replaced the basic Amigo/Tiger truck.

=== Honda ===
Honda Cars Philippines Inc. (HCPI) was established in October 1990. Under the Philippine government's Car Development Program, production operations commenced in February 1992 in their Santa Rosa, Laguna plant. As of 2020, HCPI had over 600 associates working with 38 dealers nationwide, and about 60 parts and materials suppliers. In March 2020, HCPI announced that it would cease production operations at its plant in Santa Rosa, marking an end to 27 years of production in the Philippines. Since then, Honda cars have been imported from nearby Southeast Asian countries like Thailand and Indonesia.

=== Hyundai ===
Hyundai first entered the Philippine market with the Excel compact car and the Grace van in the early 1990s, later introducing the Starex and the second-generation Elantra towards the end of the decade. Their assembly plant in Santa Rosa, Laguna currently produces the Accent, H-100, and the H350. As of June 2022, there are 39 dealerships around the country, a number expected to increase to 44 by the end of the year. Hyundai Asia Resources, Inc. (HARI) currently focuses on jeepneys, trucks, and buses, while Hyundai Motor Philippines, Inc. (HMPH) focuses on cars, SUVs, and passenger vans.

HARI was appointed by Hyundai in 2001 as the distributor of Hyundai passenger cars in the Philippines, and is currently the official distributor of Hyundai commercial vehicles in the country. Formerly the third most successful foreign division in the Philippine automotive industry, HARI abandoned passenger car sales amidst the COVID-19 pandemic, damaging their reputation and hurting sales elsewhere. In late 2020, they launched Changan Motor Philippines, Inc. (CMPI) and became the official distributor of Changan vehicles in the country. HARI expects sales to be boosted by its Hyundai Modern Jeepneys, which are made to replace older jeepneys as part of the Public Utility Vehicle Modernization Program.

HMPH is currently the official distributor of Hyundai passenger cars in the country after taking over from HARI in early 2022. Audrey Byun is the CEO, while Lee Dong-wook is the President and Victor Jose Vela is the Deputy General Manager of the company. HMPH started operations on June 1, 2022 and unveiled 4 new models (the Creta subcompact crossover, the Tucson compact crossover, the Santa Fe mid-size crossover, and the Staria passenger van) through a dealer conference on June 20, 2022. Sales of these cars began in July 2022.

=== Isuzu ===
Isuzu's Philippine debut was in the 1950s through its line of trucks. In 1989, Isuzu Motors Pilipinas was formed as a subsidiary of Isuzu and gave way to Isuzu Philippines Corporation in 1995. Aside from trucks, it also produced SUVs, MPVs, and pickup trucks such as the Trooper, Hi-Lander/Crosswind, Fuego, and the D-Max. The company has been exclusively making trucks since its discontinuation of Crosswind production in 2017 and local D-Max production in 2019; subsequent D-Max models have been imported from Thailand.

=== Kia ===
Kia began its operation in the Philippines in May 1994 under management of the Columbian Autocar Corporation. It assembled the Pride hatchback and sedans as part of the Car Development Program. It also assembled the Ceres and Besta vans, and the Pregio. Since 2019, Kia Philippines has been managed by the Ayala Corporation.

=== Mazda ===
Mazda was introduced to the Philippines during the 1970s by Francisco Motors Corporation, and again in 1993 by the Columbian Autocar Corporation. Francisco Motors manufactured fourth-generation B-series pickups and E2000 vans until the late 1990s. Under Columbian Autocar, it assembled the 7th and 8th generations of the Mazda 323 (during which both generations were sold alongside each other). In the 2000s, the Mazda3 and the Mazda Tribute were assembled at Ford's Santa Rosa plant under a partnership with Ford Motor Company. Bermaz Auto Philippines is the current importer and distributor of Mazda vehicles in the country and has its own warehouse for storing vehicles located in Cabuyao, Laguna.

=== Mercedes-Benz ===
Mercedes-Benz's Philippine presence was established in the 1990s under the Luxury Car Program. Prior to that, the brand had been in the country since the 1950s, with the Ponton, W110, W114/W115 and the W123 being assembled locally. Currently, Auto Nation Group, Inc. (formerly known as CATS Motors, Inc.) is the general importer and distributor of Mercedes-Benz vehicles, parts and accessories in the Philippines. Its history traces back to 1989, when founder Felix R. Ang opened CATS as a car accessories, tires sales and servicing business. Mercedes-Benz appointed CATS Motors as an authorized workshop in the Philippines in 1991, and eventually as a dealer in 1993. Auto Nation Group is also responsible for selling Chrysler, Dodge, Jeep, and Ram vehicles in the country.

=== Mitsubishi ===
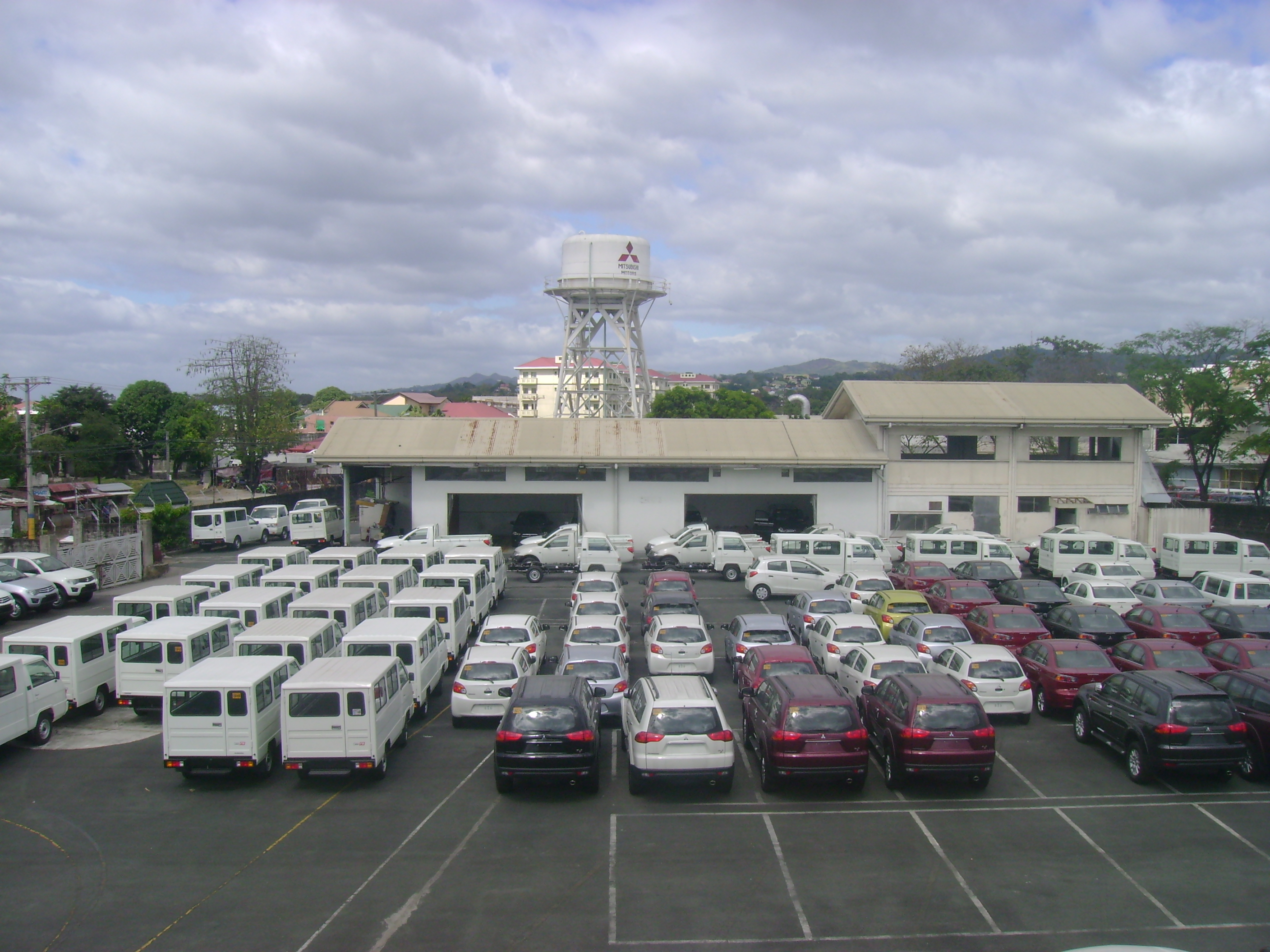
MMPC's former plant in Cainta, Rizal.

Mitsubishi Motors Philippines was originally established in 1963 as Chrysler Philippines Corporation, the assembler and distributor of Chrysler, Dodge and Plymouth cars in the country. The company was incorporated in 1987 as Philippine Automotive Manufacturing Corporation (PAMCOR). In 1996, the company was renamed Mitsubishi Motors Philippines Corporation (MMPC). Its former assembly plant is located in Cainta, Rizal, operating from 1963 to 2014. Since 2015, its current plant is located in Santa Rosa, Laguna. In April 2022, MMPC began exporting the Philippine-made L300 van to other Southeast Asian markets.

=== Nissan ===
Nissan's Philippine operations started in 1969 with the appointment of Universal Motors Corporation (UMC) as the authorized assembler and distributor of Datsun vehicles in the country. In 1983, Nissan Motor Company established Pilipinas Nissan, Inc. (PNI) to assemble and distribute Nissan passenger cars. The company was renamed Nissan Motor Philippines, Inc. (NMPI) in 1991. In September 2000, Yulon Motor Co. took control of NMPI from Nissan Motor Company. Since 2013, the brand has been under direct control of Nissan Motor Co., under Nissan Philippines Inc. (NPI). In 2021, Nissan Philippines announced that it would shut down its Santa Rosa plant by March.

=== Subaru ===
In 1996, Columbian Autocar Corporation introduced Subaru to the Philippine market. The brand withdrew in 2000 due to poor sales, but returned in 2006 under new management. The current official importer and distributor of Subaru vehicles is Motor Image Pilipinas Inc., a subsidiary of Tan Chong International.

=== Toyota ===
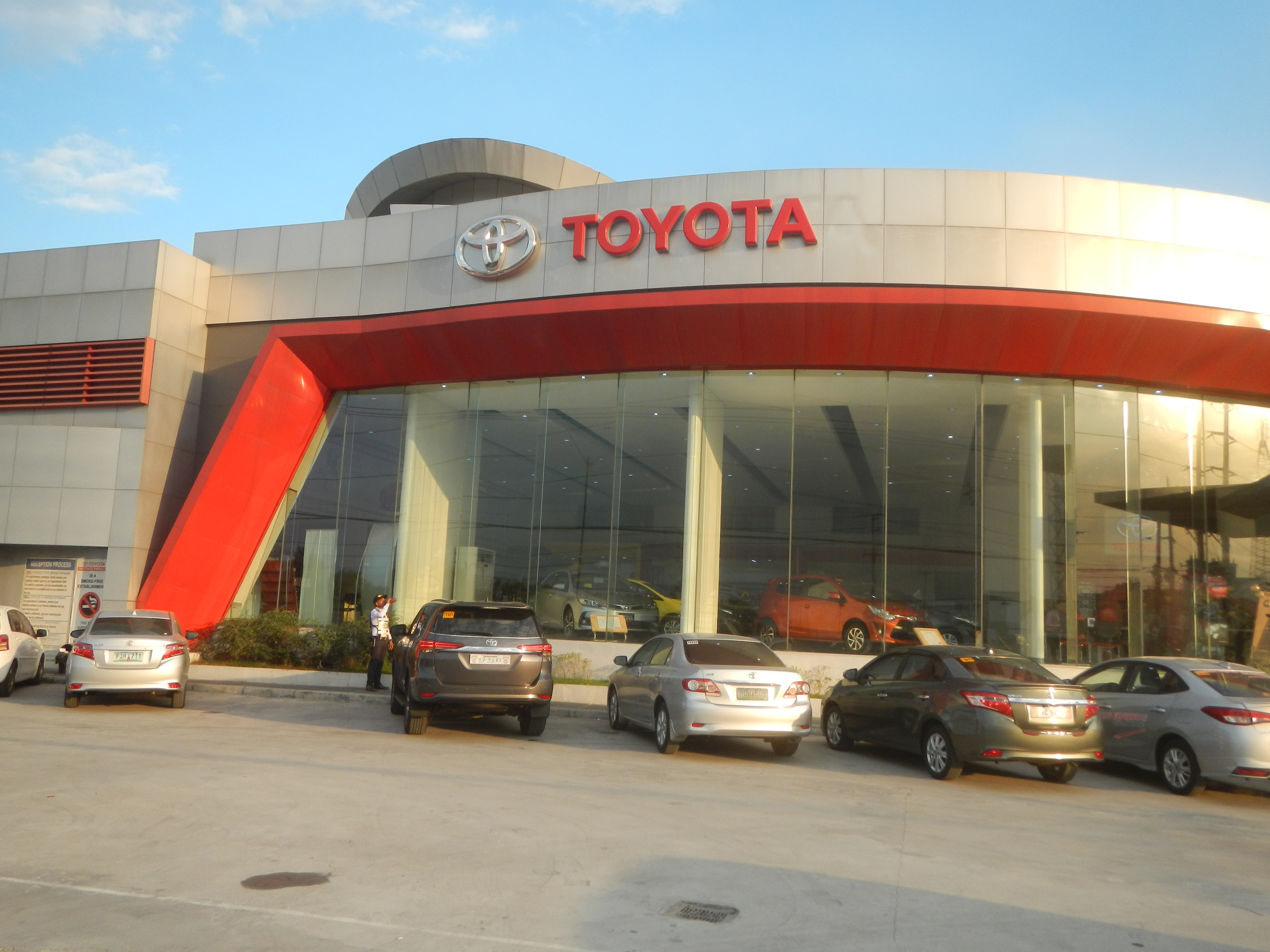
A Toyota dealership in the Philippines.

Established on August 3, 1988, Toyota Motor Philippines is a subsidiary of Toyota Motor Corporation, based in Santa Rosa, Laguna, Philippines. They are responsible for the assembly and distribution of Toyota vehicles in the Philippines since 1988. Since 2009, TMP has also been the official distributor of Lexus cars in the country, operating a dealership in Manila. TMP is the largest automotive company in the country, with the widest vehicle line-up and a sales distribution and service network composed of 72 dealerships nationwide. Prior to that, Toyota vehicles had been sold in the country since 1962 by Delta Motors Corporation. They were responsible for assembling and distributing Toyota vehicles for the Philippine market. Delta Motors collapsed in 1984 during the Philippine economic downturn of the early 1980s, leading to Toyota's absence in the market for four years.

== Defunct manufacturers ==
=== Daewoo ===
Daewoo sold moderately in the country until it was forced to pull out due to the 1997 Asian financial crisis, which led to its bankruptcy and acquisition by GM. Today, many of their cars are sold under the Chevrolet brand. Zyle Daewoo Bus continues to manufacture buses in the country.

=== Daihatsu ===
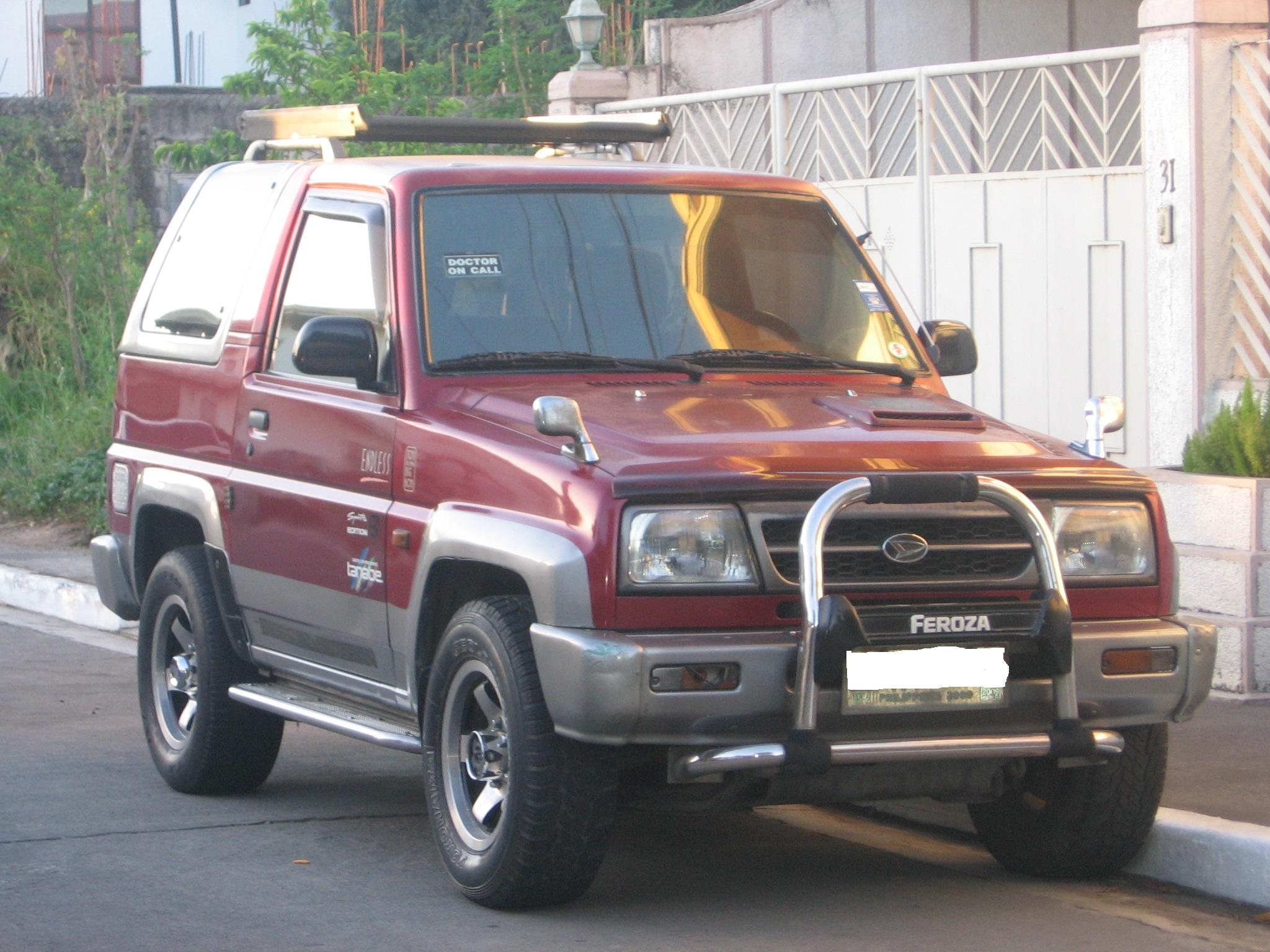
A Daihatsu Feroza in the Philippines.

The Daihatsu Feroza was considered a status symbol during its release in the late 1980s, while the Hijet was a popular taxicab. The Daihatsu Charade was also a popular hatchback in the 1990s. Despite its absence, some of their cars today are sold under the Toyota brand. Cars like the Toyota Rush and the Toyota Wigo were originally Daihatsu models built in Indonesia.

=== Fiat ===
Despite being a bestseller worldwide, the Fiat Uno sold poorly in the country. In mid-2018, Abarth was introduced into the Philippine market selling the Abarth versions of the Fiat 500. Petromax Enterprises, the distributors of the newly introduced brand in the local market, also reintroduced Alfa Romeo into the market, which was last seen in the 1990s.

=== Lincoln ===
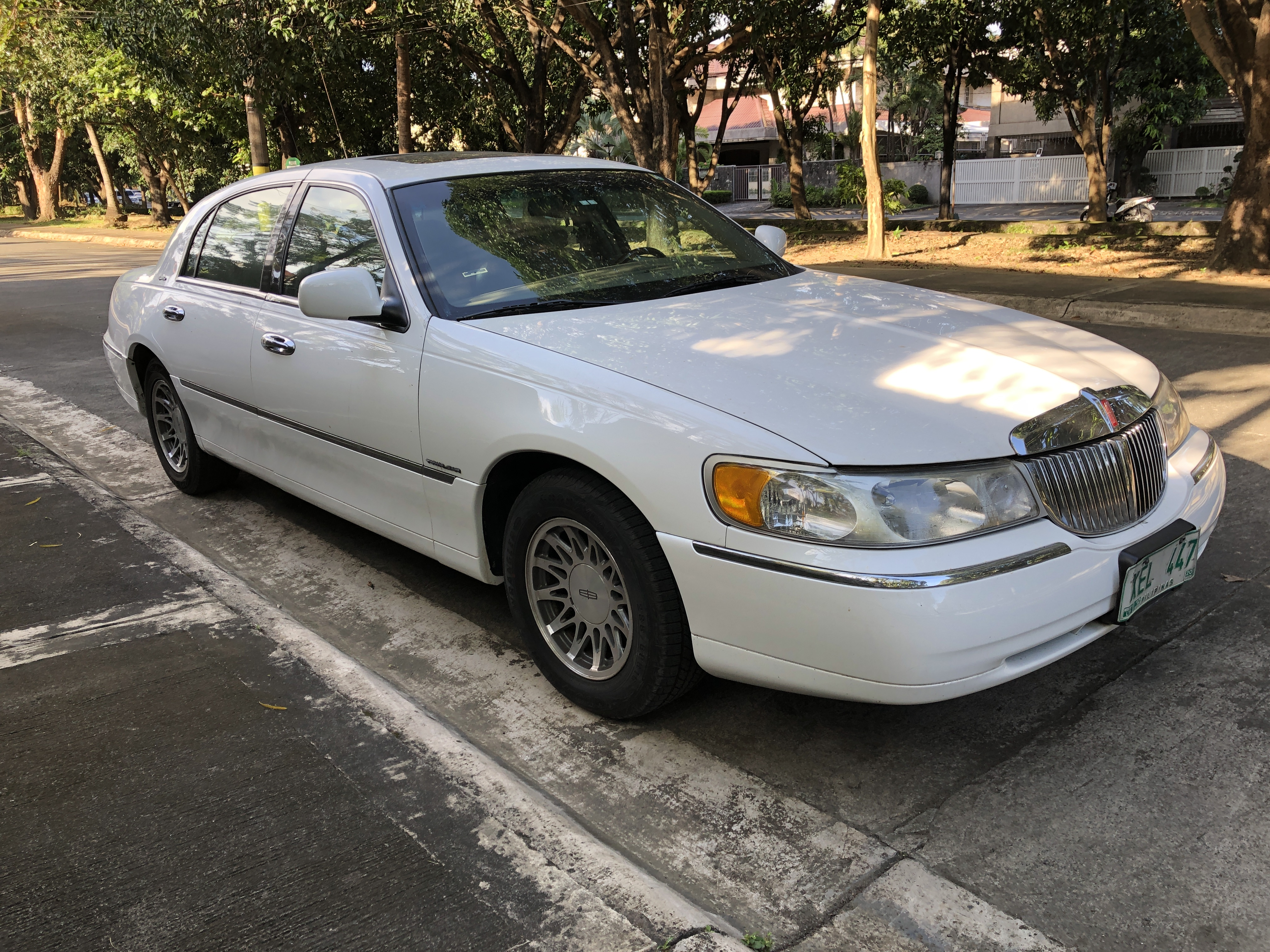
A parked Lincoln Town Car.

From 1998 to 2002, Ford Philippines offered the Lincoln Town Car and sold it through its dealerships. It became popular among limousine operators and funeral homes who often converted them into hearses. Currently, the Lincoln Navigator is imported via the grey market.

=== Opel ===
Opel and Ford were the two most popular non-Japanese marques in the Philippines in the 1960s and 1970s. However, Opel pulled out of the country after the Marcos administration enacted martial law. Opel returned in the mid-1990s with the Astra, Vectra, and Omega, which sold well as cheap alternatives to Japanese cars, but was replaced in the Philippines by Chevrolet's then-brand-new line up (including cars such as the Chevrolet Zafira). Despite being an Opel-based car, the Zafira was sold alongside the Astra until the brand's discontinuation in the country. Opel Vectras and Astras are still a common sight on the roads of Manila, while the Tigra and the Manta are popular among enthusiasts.

=== Proton ===
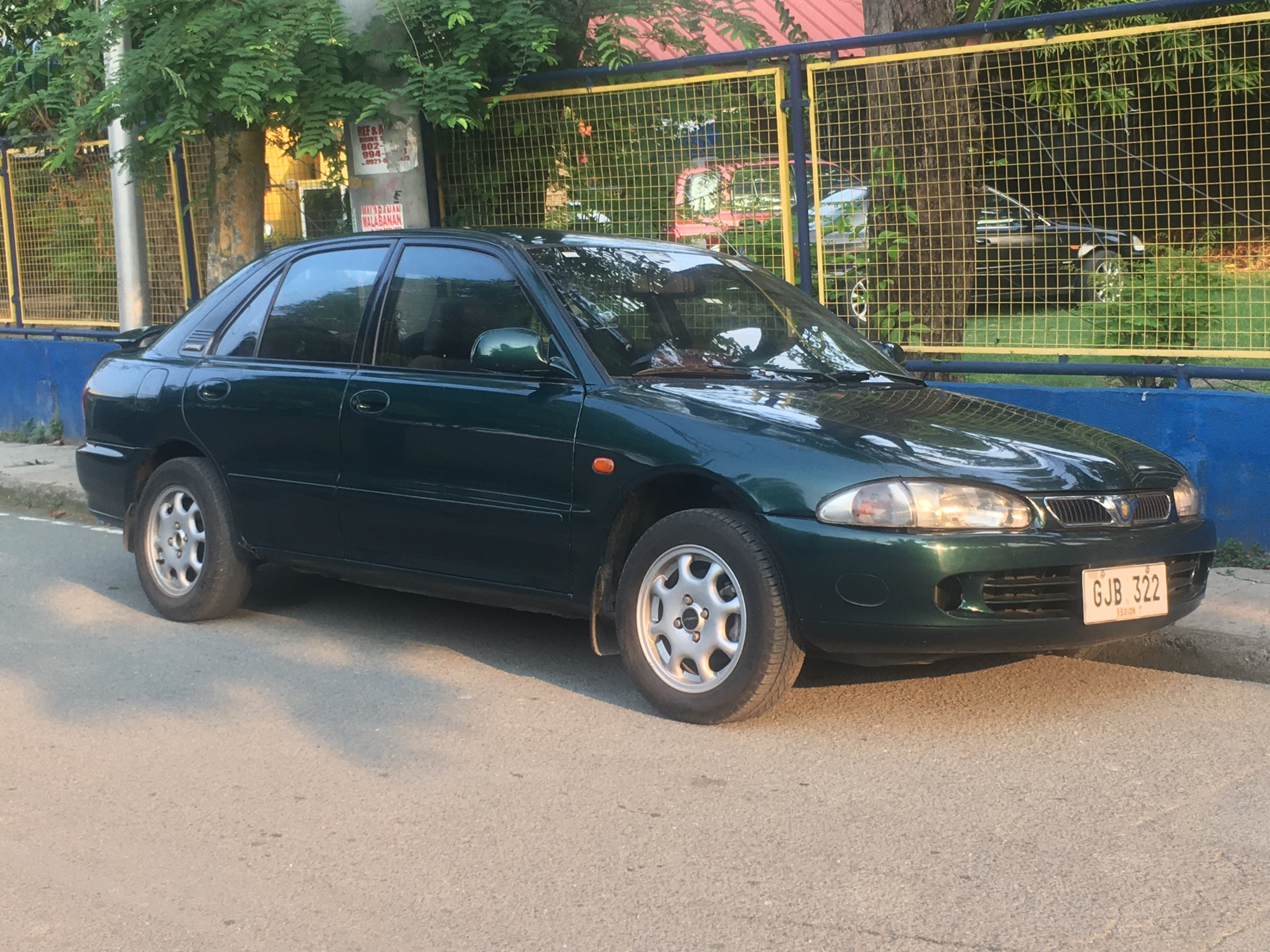
A Proton Wira in Metro Manila.

The Malaysian firm Proton only sold the Wira before the Asian economic crisis forced them out of the country.

=== Renault ===
In the late 1970s, some Renault models were imported into the country. In 1996, a dealership in Metro Manila imported several Renault models. It failed to succeed as it was deemed too expensive.

=== Smart ===
The Smart Fortwo city car was touted as ideal for Manila's congested roads, but failed due to its relatively high price. It remained slightly popular with companies who used them for advertising. The Fortwo and the Roadster were both sold by CATS Motors.

=== SsangYong ===
In the 1990s, SsangYong became popular for their Musso SUV and the Istana-based MB100 van – both of which were marketed as Mercedes-Benz vehicles. The brand pulled out of the Philippine market in 2012. In January 2016, Ssangyong returned with their new distributor, Berjaya Group Malaysia. In 2023, SsangYong is now known as KG Mobility.

=== Vauxhall and Holden ===
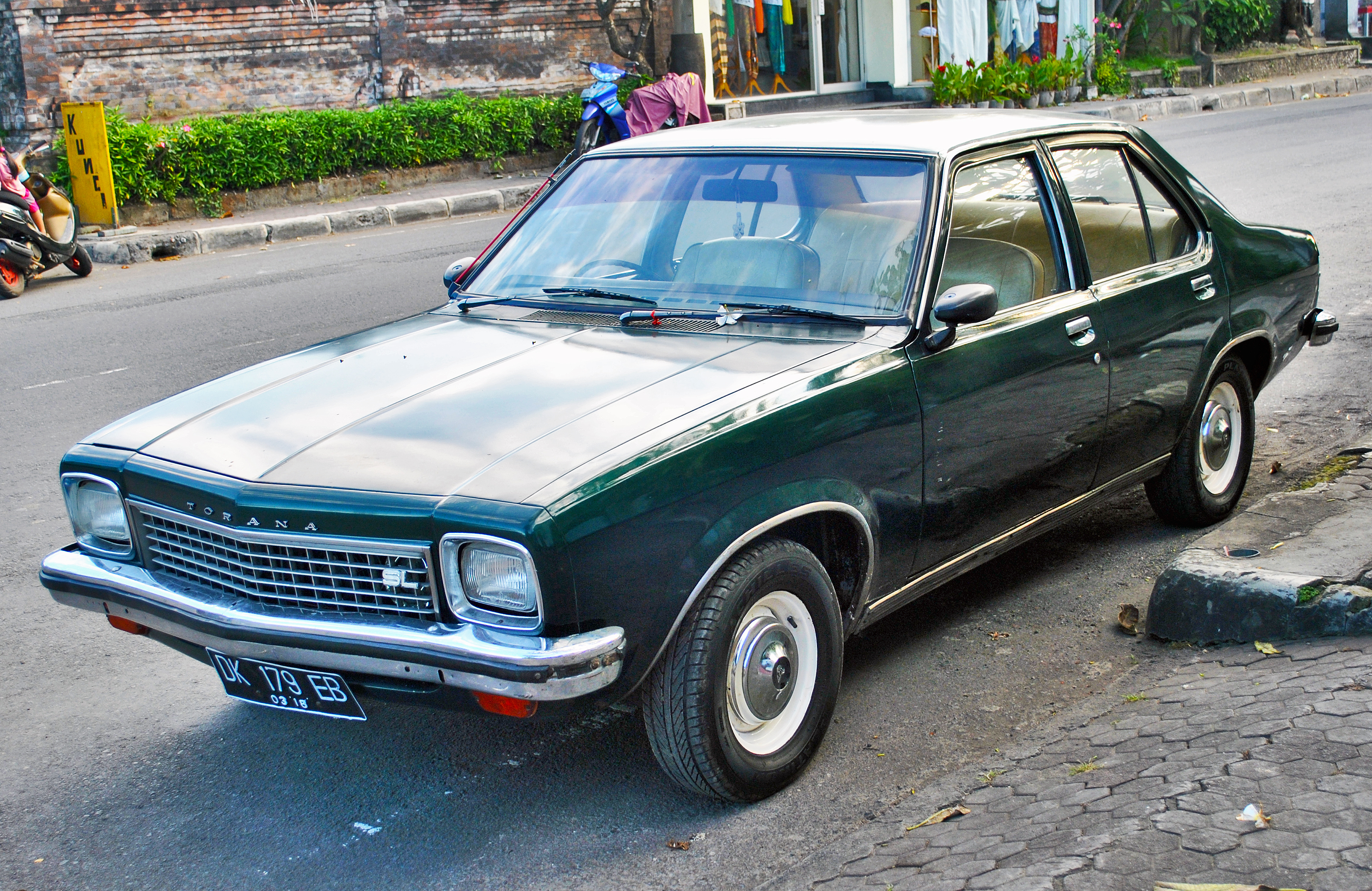
The Holden Torana was largely replaced by the Isuzu Gemini.

Vauxhall also produced and sold cars in the Philippine market during the 1960s, including the Vauxhall Viva and the Vauxhall Victor. Holden also assembled a couple of cars in the country during the 1960s and the 1970s, with the Torana being one of the most popular models.

=== Volkswagen ===
Domingo M. Guevarra Sr. and his company, DMG Inc. were responsible for importing, producing, and assembling Volkswagens in the Philippines. The Volkswagen Kombi, Beetle, and Brasilia were some of the models built by DMG. DMG was also known for its DMG-Volkswagen Sakbayan, their attempt to build a national car based on the Volkswagen Country Buggy. DMG went bankrupt in the mid-1980s.

Volkswagen came back to the Philippines in the 1990s, selling the Polo Classic from 1996 until 1999. The Polo Classic, alongside the Caravelle, was locally assembled in Alaminos. In 2013, Volkswagen returned to the Philippine market with the partnership of Ayala Corporation.

In 2018, Volkswagen Philippines discontinued the Philippine sale of international models such as the Jetta, Passat and the Golf GTS in favor of Chinese-sourced models like the Santana, Lavida, and Lamando as part of the new ASEAN-China Free Trade Agreement. The reason for the shift was to reduce tax imposed on the cars by 5%. The decision sparked negativity to the brand, mostly contributed by the South China Sea Arbitration, with Volkswagen reporting low sales in the country - only 177 cars were sold in 2019. Volkswagen Philippines president Felipe Estrella III emphasized that "regardless of the source, the product is the same". The Multivan Kombi that was launched in the Philippines in July 2021, until its discontinuation from the market, was the only non-SAIC Volkswagen product in its lineup.

On September 18, 2025, the Ayala Group, Volkswagen's exclusive distributor in the Philippine market, announced the cessation of their partnership, and with that the distribution of Volkswagen vehicles in the country.

== Grey-market imports ==
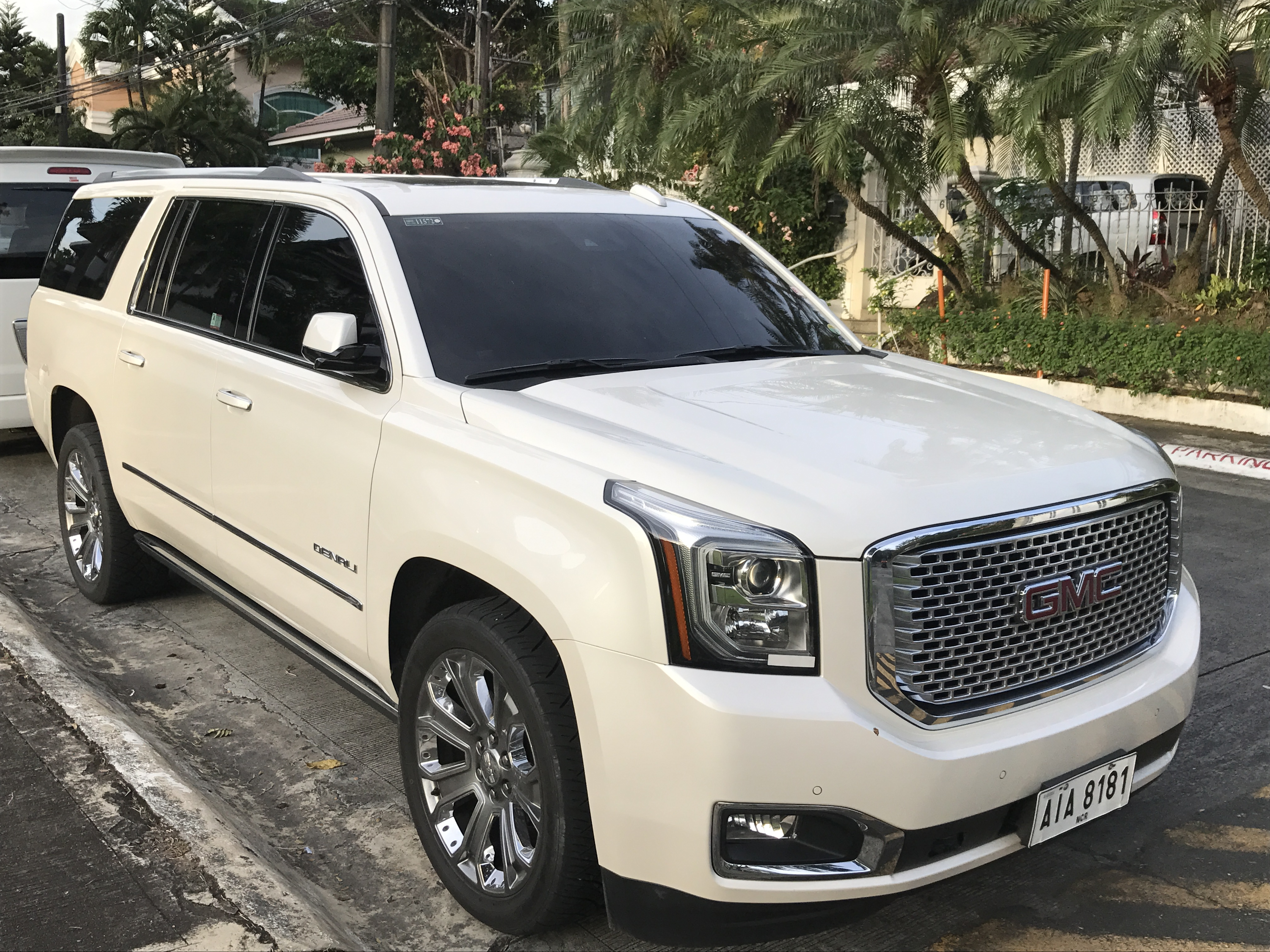
A GMC Yukon XL in the Philippines. GMC vehicles were never officially available in the country. While its counterpart, the Chevrolet Suburban is officially sold in the market.

Specialty dealerships across the country import various new vehicles from several countries such as South Korea, the US, and the UAE. In some cases, select authorized dealerships may also use indent orders to import vehicles or trims that are not part of their official inventory. As an example, Ford sold the Lincoln Navigator to a select group of buyers years after the Lincoln brand had been phased out of the market. Some brands, such as Hummer and Cadillac, can only be acquired through grey import dealers. Due to the popularity of the Cadillac Escalade in the grey import market, GM Philippines considered bringing the brand to the Philippine market, but realized that it would likely fail due to the competitive market for luxury SUVs. US-market Toyotas such as the Sienna are also imported into the country, as well as the J70 Series Land Cruiser from the Middle East. Despite a Genesis G90 being shown at MIAS in 2017, most Genesis vehicles in the country are sold by grey importers.

In addition, many pre-owned vehicles are imported from Japan or Hong Kong – countries that use right-hand drive vehicles on the left side of the road. Because right-hand-drive vehicles are banned in the Philippines, these vehicles are converted to left-hand drive in conversion bays and freeport zones in Subic, Santa Ana, and Toledo. These vehicles are seen with plate numbers R for Subic (Central Luzon), B for Cagayan (Cagayan Valley), K for Cagayan De Oro (Northern Mindanao), and Y for Cebu (Central Visayas).

=== Vehicle smuggling ===
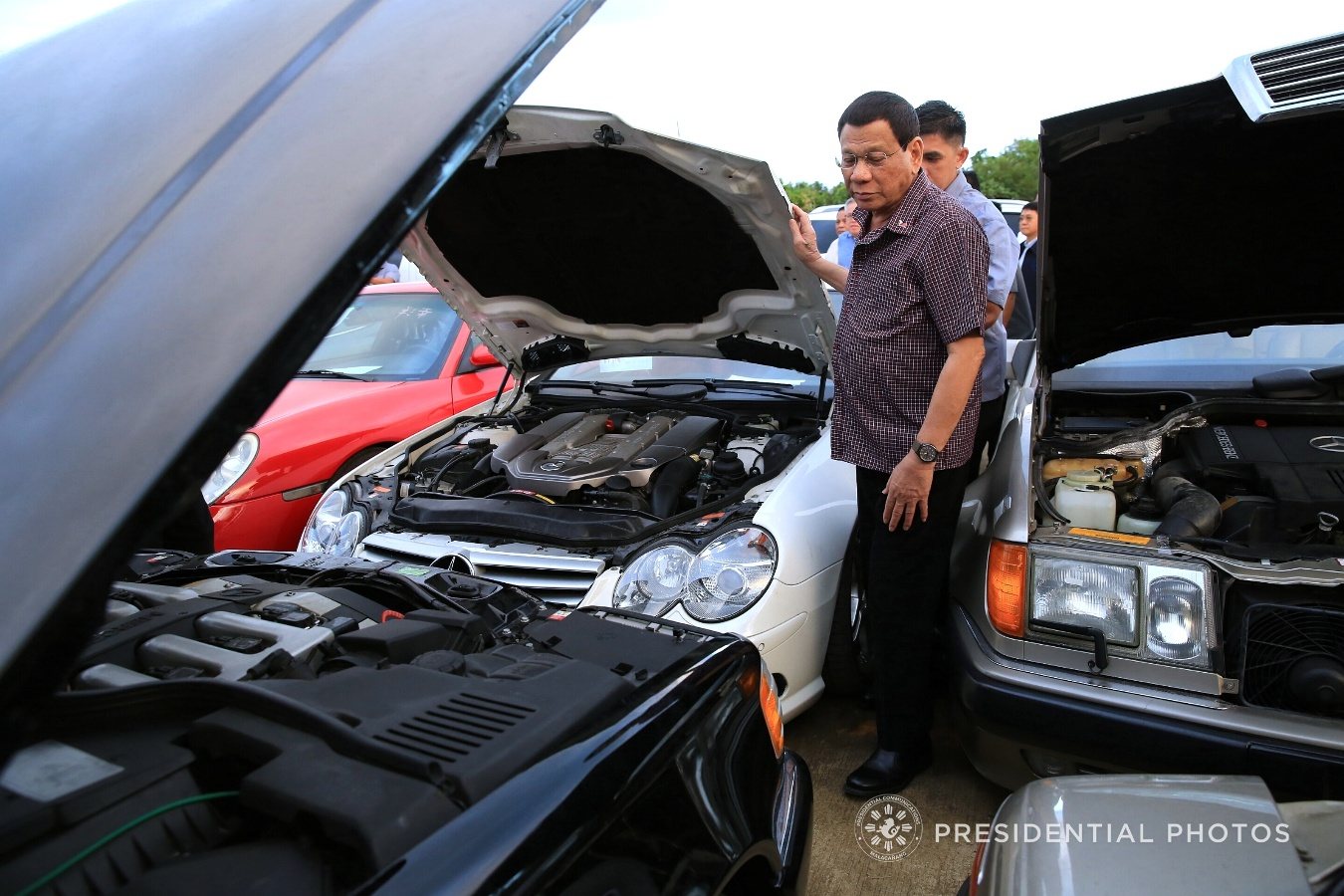
President Rodrigo Duterte inspecting the smuggled vehicles before they were destroyed at Port Irene in Sta. Ana, Cagayan

Smuggling of used cars is rampant, with as many as sixty percent of registrations being of cars not officially imported.

The country made headlines in 2007 when president Gloria Macapagal Arroyo ordered the immediate destruction of 18 luxury vehicles that were illegally smuggled into the country. The cars, which included four BMWs and a Lincoln Navigator, were crushed by backhoes and other heavy construction vehicles at a depot in the Freeport Zone.

Since 2018, there have been a series of public destructions of contraband luxury vehicles under the order of President Rodrigo Duterte as part of a government anti-corruption movement. The Bureau of Customs has destroyed illegally smuggled cars worth millions of dollars using backhoes and bulldozers. Cars included Mercedes-Benzes, BMWs, Alpinas, Ferraris, Jaguars, Lamborghinis, Porsches, and a C3 Corvette Stingray. The most recent car destroyed was a Mclaren 620R; it was seized in the Port of Manila in 2020 and destroyed a year later in June 2021 along with other vehicles.

Politicians have shown concerns about the destroyed vehicles. Senator Koko Pimentel has suggested that the seized luxury cars should be auctioned to foreign buyers and collectors rather than destroyed, with the profits being used to help victims of natural disasters in the Philippines.

== Vehicles currently manufactured in the Philippines ==
Toyota: Innova, Vios, Hilux Tamaraw

Mitsubishi: L300, Mirage, Mirage G4
Fuso: Fuso Canter, Fuso FK/FL/FM, Fuso FI, Fuso FJ, Rosa, Fuso FP/FV

Hyundai: H-100
Hyundai Trucks and Buses: Xcient, Super Aero City, Universe

Kia: K2500

Foton: Thunder, View Ambulance, View Transvan, View Traveller, Toano, Gratour MT, Gratour TM, Harabas TM 300, Tornado, Auman Series Trucks

Isuzu Trucks: C/E-Series, F-Series, N/Q-Series
Isuzu Buses: PABFVR34P, PABFTR33P, LV123, LV423, Mini Bus

Hino Trucks: 300 Series, 500 Series, 700 Series
Hino Buses: RC421(ER200), RF821(EK100), RM2KSS (K13D), RK3HS (H07D), RK1JMT (J08C-TK), RK1JST (J08C-TK), RM2PSS (P11C-TH), RU2PSS (P11C-TE), RK8JMUA (J08E-UB), RK8JSUA (J08E-UB), RN8J (J08E-UB), FB2W, FB4J, FC3J, FC9JL7A (J05E-TY), FF3H (H06D)AK174, (EH700)AK176 (EH700), FG8JPSB (J08E-UG), FG1JPUB (J08C-F), FG1JPUZ (J08C-TT), FG8JPUB (J08E-UG), FG8JP7A (J08E-WF), HT223A (M10U), HT225A (M10U), SH2P, SH1E, SS2P, SS1E

JMC: Vigus, Transporter, Compadre, N700, N720

Daewoo Bus: BV115, BF106, BS106, BH117H, BS120S

Dongfeng: Captain E, Captain N, Captain D9, KD6Z, K04U, K47H, K23W, KW46, TW37, K37F

MAN: TGS, CLA, Lion's Chassis, Lion's City, Lion's Intercity

== Statistics ==
=== Historical sales rank ===
Top 10 best-selling vehicles in the Philippines, 1995–2025 Source: BSCB AutoIndustriya.com
Year	Models and ranking									
Year	1st	2nd	3rd	4th	5th	6th	7th	8th	9th	10th
1995	Toyota Corolla	Toyota Tamaraw FX	Nissan Sentra	Mitsubishi Lancer	Toyota Corona	Toyota Crown	Mitsubishi Galant	Toyota LiteAce	Mitsubishi L300	Isuzu KB/Fuego
1996	Toyota Corolla	Honda Civic	Toyota Tamaraw FX	Mitsubishi Lancer	Toyota Corona	Mitsubishi L300	Mitsubishi Galant	Toyota LiteAce	Toyota Crown	Isuzu KB/Fuego
1997	Toyota Corolla	Toyota Tamaraw FX	Mitsubishi Lancer	Toyota Corona	Nissan Sentra	Mitsubishi Galant	Nissan Cefiro	Isuzu KB/Fuego	Toyota LiteAce	Isuzu Hi-Lander
1998	Toyota Corolla	Honda Civic	Mitsubishi Adventure	Mitsubishi Lancer	Nissan Sentra	Isuzu Hi-Lander	Kia Besta	Honda CR-V	Toyota Revo	Toyota Tamaraw FX
1999	Toyota Revo	Honda Civic	Toyota Corolla	Mitsubishi Adventure	Nissan Sentra	Honda CR-V	Toyota Camry	Isuzu Hi-Lander	Mitsubishi Lancer	Mitsubishi Pajero
2000	Toyota Revo	Mitsubishi Adventure	Honda Civic	Toyota Corolla	Isuzu Hi-Lander	Nissan Sentra Exalta	Honda City	Toyota HiAce	Honda CR-V	Nissan Frontier
2001	Toyota Revo	Mitsubishi Adventure	Isuzu Hi-Lander/Hi-Lander Crossiwind	Toyota Corolla/Corolla Altis	Honda Civic	Nissan Sentra Exalta	Mitsubishi Lancer	Honda City	Nissan Frontier	Mitsubishi Pajero
2002	Toyota Revo	Isuzu Hi-Lander Crosswind	Honda CR-V	Mitsubishi Adventure	Toyota Corolla Altis	Toyota Camry	Isuzu Hi-Lander Crosswind	Nissan Sentra Exalta	Ford Lynx	Mitsubishi Lancer
2003	Toyota Revo	Honda CR-V	Toyota Corolla Altis	Mitsubishi Adventure	Ford Escape	Toyota Camry	Isuzu Hi-Lander Crosswind	Ford Lynx	Mitsubishi Lancer	Toyota Vios
2004	Toyota Revo	Toyota Corolla Altis	Isuzu Hi-Lander Crosswind	Mitsubishi Adventure	Toyota Camry	Ford Escape	Toyota Vios	Nissan Sentra	Mitsubishi Lancer	Ford Lynx
2005	Toyota Innova	Toyota Vios	Mitsubishi Adventure	Isuzu Crosswind	Toyota Corolla Altis	Toyota Fortuner	Toyota Camry	Ford Escape	Mitsubishi Lancer	Nissan Sentra
2006	Toyota Innova	Toyota Vios	Toyota Fortuner	Isuzu Alterra	Mitsubishi Adventure	Mitsubishi L300	Honda Civic	Isuzu Crosswind	Toyota Corolla Altis	Toyota Camry
2007	Toyota Innova	Toyota Vios	Mitsubishi Adventure	Toyota Fortuner	Toyota Avanza	Isuzu Crosswind	Toyota Hilux	Isuzu D-Max	Mitsubishi L300	Honda Civic
2008	Toyota Vios	Toyota Innova	Toyota Fortuner	Toyota Avanza	Isuzu Crosswind	Honda Civic	Mitsubishi Adventure	Toyota Corolla Altis	Honda City	Mitsubishi L300
2009	Toyota Vios	Toyota Innova	Honda City	Mitsubishi Montero Sport	Toyota Fortuner	Isuzu Crosswind	Honda Jazz	Honda Civic	Toyota Hilux	Toyota Corolla Altis
2010	Toyota Vios	Toyota Innova	Mitsubishi Montero Sport	Honda City	Toyota Fortuner	Toyota Hilux	Honda Civic	Toyota Corolla Altis	Honda Jazz	Mitsubishi L300
2011	Toyota Vios	Toyota Innova	Mitsubishi Montero Sport	Toyota Fortuner	Toyota Hilux	Honda City	Honda Jazz	Isuzu Crosswind	Honda Civic	Toyota Corolla Altis
2012	Toyota Vios	Toyota Innova	Mitsubishi Montero Sport	Toyota Fortuner	Toyota Hilux	Toyota Avanza	Honda City	Honda Jazz	Toyota Corolla Altis	Isuzu Crosswind
2013	Toyota Vios	Mitsubishi Montero Sport	Toyota Innova	Toyota Fortuner	Toyota Avanza	Mitsubishi Mirage	Toyota Hilux	Honda City	Isuzu Crosswind	Toyota Corolla Altis
2014	Toyota Vios	Toyota Fortuner	Mitsubishi Montero Sport	Toyota Innova	Toyota HiAce	Toyota Wigo	Ford Ranger	Toyota Avanza	Honda City	Toyota Hilux
2015	Toyota Vios	Toyota Innova	Toyota HiAce	Toyota Fortuner	Toyota Wigo	Mitsubishi Montero Sport	Mitsubishi Mirage G4	Isuzu MU-X	Honda City	Toyota Hilux
2016	Toyota Vios	Toyota Fortuner	Toyota HiAce	Toyota Wigo	Toyota Innova	Toyota Avanza	Mitsubishi Mirage G4	Isuzu MU-X	Ford Everest	Toyota Hilux
2017	Toyota Fortuner	Toyota Vios	Toyota Innova	Toyota HiAce	Mitsubishi Montero Sport	Toyota Wigo	Hyundai Accent	Toyota Avanza	Toyota Hilux	Mitsubishi L300
2018	Toyota Vios	Toyota Fortuner	Toyota Wigo	Toyota Hilux	Toyota Innova	Toyota HiAce	Mitsubishi Montero Sport	Nissan Navara	Hyundai Accent	Mitsubishi Mirage G4
2019	Toyota Vios	Toyota Hilux	Toyota Innova	Toyota Fortuner	Mitsubishi Xpander	Nissan Navara	Toyota HiAce	Toyota Wigo	Mitsubishi Mirage G4	Toyota Rush
2020	Toyota Vios	Toyota Hilux	Toyota Wigo	Toyota Innova	Mitsubishi Xpander/ Xpander Cross	Toyota Hiace	Toyota Rush	Ford Ranger	Nissan Navara	Mitsubishi Mirage G4
2021	Toyota Vios	Toyota Hilux	Toyota Wigo	Toyota Innova	Toyota Fortuner	Toyota Rush	Mitsubishi Xpander/Xpander Cross	Toyota HiAce	Mitsubishi L300	Nissan Navara
2022	Toyota Vios	Toyota Hilux	Toyota Innova	Toyota Fortuner	Mitsubishi Xpander/Xpander Cross	Toyota Rush	Toyota Wigo	Toyota Raize	Toyota HiAce	Ford Ranger
2023	Toyota Vios	Toyota Hilux	Mitsubishi Mirage G4	Mitsubishi Xpander/Xpander Cross	Toyota Raize	Toyota Innova	Toyota Hiace	Toyota Wigo	Toyota Fortuner	Toyota Veloz
2024	Toyota Vios	Toyota Hilux	Mitsubishi Mirage G4	Mitsubishi Xpander/Xpander Cross	Toyota Wigo	Toyota Raize	Toyota Innova	Toyota Avanza	Toyota Hiace	Mitsubishi L300
2025	Mitsubishi Xpander/Xpander Cross	Toyota Vios	Toyota Avanza	Toyota Hilux	Toyota Hiace	Toyota Wigo	Toyota Raize	Mitsubishi Mirage G4	Toyota Tamaraw	Toyota Innova
	1st	2nd	3rd	4th	5th	6th	7th	8th	9th	10th
Locally built vehicles Imported vehicles Note: 1. The Sentra Exalta from the 2000 model year is based on the B14 Sentra, while the 2001 model year is now a rebadged Nissan Bluebird Sylphy.: 2. The Corolla E110 and the Corolla Altis share the same ranking in 2001, as both models were sold together until 2004.
See also : Best-selling models in: Australia; Brazil; India; Indonesia; Japan; Malaysia; Thailand; Sweden

=== Sales by brand ===
2025
Rank	Brand	Sales	Market share
1	Toyota	227,595	46.21%
2	Mitsubishi	86,808	17.62%
3	BYD	26,122	5.30%
4	Suzuki	21,984	4.46%
5	Ford	21,784	4.42%
6	Nissan	20,571	4.18%
7	Isuzu	17,237	3.50%
8	Honda	16,257	3.30%
9	Hyundai	10,475	2.13%
10	MG Motor	8,715	1.77%
others		35,010	6.99%
Total		492,558	100%

2024
Rank	Brand	Sales	Market share
1	Toyota	215,756	45.41%
2	Mitsubishi	89,124	18.76%
3	Ford	27,997	5.89%
4	Nissan	26,774	5.64%
5	Suzuki	20,371	4.29%
6	Isuzu	17,641	3.71%
7	Honda	15,518	3.27%
8	Hyundai	12,023	2.53%
9	MG Motor	9,016	1.90%
10	Kia	6,692	1.41%
others		34,182	7.21%
Total		475,094	100%

2023
Rank	Brand	Sales	Market share
1	Toyota	198,188	44.90%
2	Mitsubishi	78,731	17.75%
3	Ford	31,320	7.10%
4	Nissan	27,136	6.15%
5	Suzuki	18,454	4.18%
6	Isuzu	17,639	3.99%
7	Honda	13,923	3.77%
8	Hyundai	9,130	2.07%
9	Geely	6,852	1.55%
10	MG Motor	5,679	1.29%
others		34,356	7.78%
Total		441,408	100%

2022
Rank	Brand	Sales	Market share
1	Toyota	173,245	46.56%
2	Mitsubishi	53,211	14.30%
3	Ford	24,710	6.64%
4	Nissan	21,222	5.70%
5	Suzuki	19,942	5.36%
6	Isuzu	17,639	4.74%
7	Honda	13,923	3.74%
8	Geely	9,302	2.50%
9	MG Motor	8,858	2.38%
10	Kia	5,012	1.35%
others		25,019	6.72%
Total		372,083	100%

2021
Rank	Brand	Sales	Market share
1	Toyota	129,101	43.88%
2	Mitsubishi	38,436	13.06%
3	Ford	20,004	6.80%
4	Nissan	19,603	6.66%
5	Suzuki	19,391	6.59%
6	Isuzu	14,424	4.90%
7	Honda	12,680	4.31%
8	Hyundai	9,061	3.08%
9	MG Motor	6,343	2.16%
10	Geely	6,104	2.07%
others		19,076	6.46%
Total		294,223	100%

2020
Rank	Brand	Sales	Market share
1	Toyota	99,545	40.11%
2	Mitsubishi	37,366	15.06%
3	Nissan	21,751	8.76%
4	Hyundai	16,651	6.71%
5	Suzuki	15,515	6.25%
6	Ford	14,775	5.95%
7	Honda	11,711	4.72%
8	Isuzu	11,240	4.53%
9	MG Motor	3,432	1.38%
10	Foton	2,456	0.99%
others		13,729	5.51%
Total		248,171	100%

2019
Rank	Brand	Sales	Market share
1	Toyota	161,385	38.74%
2	Mitsubishi	64,065	15.38%
3	Nissan	42,694	10.25%
4	Hyundai	33,762	8.10%
5	Suzuki	23,918	5.74%
6	Ford	21,900	5.26%
7	Honda	20,338	4.88%
8	Isuzu	13,971	3.35%
9	MG Motor	5,085	1.22%
10	Kia	5,019	1.20%
others		24,382	5.85%
Total		416,627	100%

2018
Rank	Brand	Sales	Market share
1	Toyota	152,389	37.93%
2	Mitsubishi	66,081	16.45%
3	Hyundai	35,401	8.81%
4	Nissan	34,952	8.70%
5	Ford	23,571	5.87%
6	Honda	23,294	5.80%
7	Suzuki	19,740	4.91%
8	Isuzu	13,971	4.16%
9	Foton	5,085	1.03%
10	Chevrolet	4,293	1.0%
others		21,488	5.39%
Total		401,803	100%

2017
Rank	Brand	Sales	Market share
1	Toyota	182,657	38.54%
2	Mitsubishi	71,001	14.98%
3	Hyundai	37,678	7.95%
4	Ford	36,623	7.73%
5	Honda	31,758	6.77%
6	Isuzu	30,086	6.35%
7	Nissan	24,995	5.27%
8	Suzuki	19,263	4.06%
9	Chevrolet	5,949	1.26%
10	Mazda	5,247	1.11%
others		28,686	6.06%
Total		473,943	100%

2016
Rank	Brand	Sales	Market share
1	Toyota	158,058	39.12%
2	Mitsubishi	59,480	14.72%
3	Hyundai	33,695	8.34%
4	Ford	33,688	8.34%
5	Isuzu	27,361	6.77%
6	Honda	23,199	5.74%
7	Nissan	16,897	4.18%
8	Suzuki	14,353	3.55%
9	Kia	7,304	1.81%
10	Chevrolet	5,931	1.47%
others		24,085	5.94%
Total		404,051	100%

== See also ==
- Economy of the Philippines
- Transportation in the Philippines
