= Buggy (automobile) =

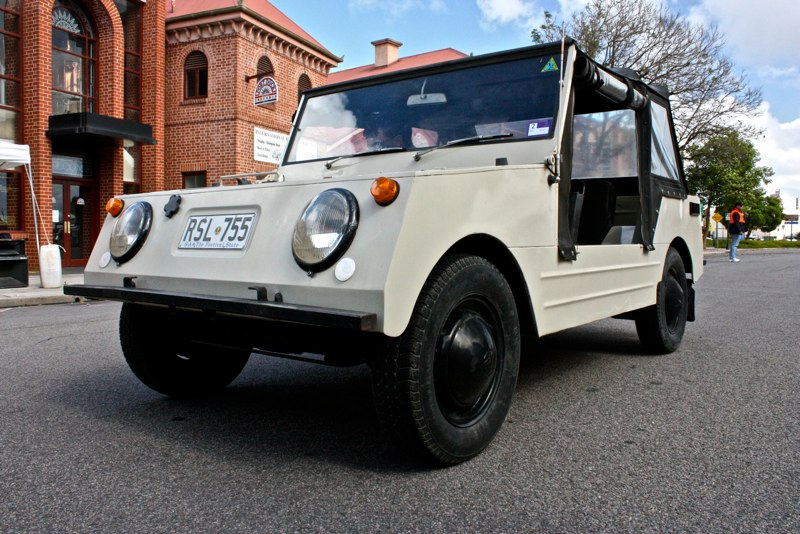
- Volkswagen Country Buggy, a military buggy

Overview
- Manufacturer: Many

Body and chassis
- Body style: Lightweight
- Related: Horse and buggy

Buggy is generally used to refer to any lightweight automobile with off-road capabilities and sparse bodywork. Most are built either as a kit car or from scratch.

== History ==
The word buggy was originally used in England to describe a lightweight two-wheeled carriage for one person, and later in America to describe a common 4-wheeled carriage. The term was extended to lightweight automobiles as they became popular. As automobiles became increasingly sophisticated, the term briefly dropped out of use before being revived to describe more specialised off-road vehicles.

== Types ==
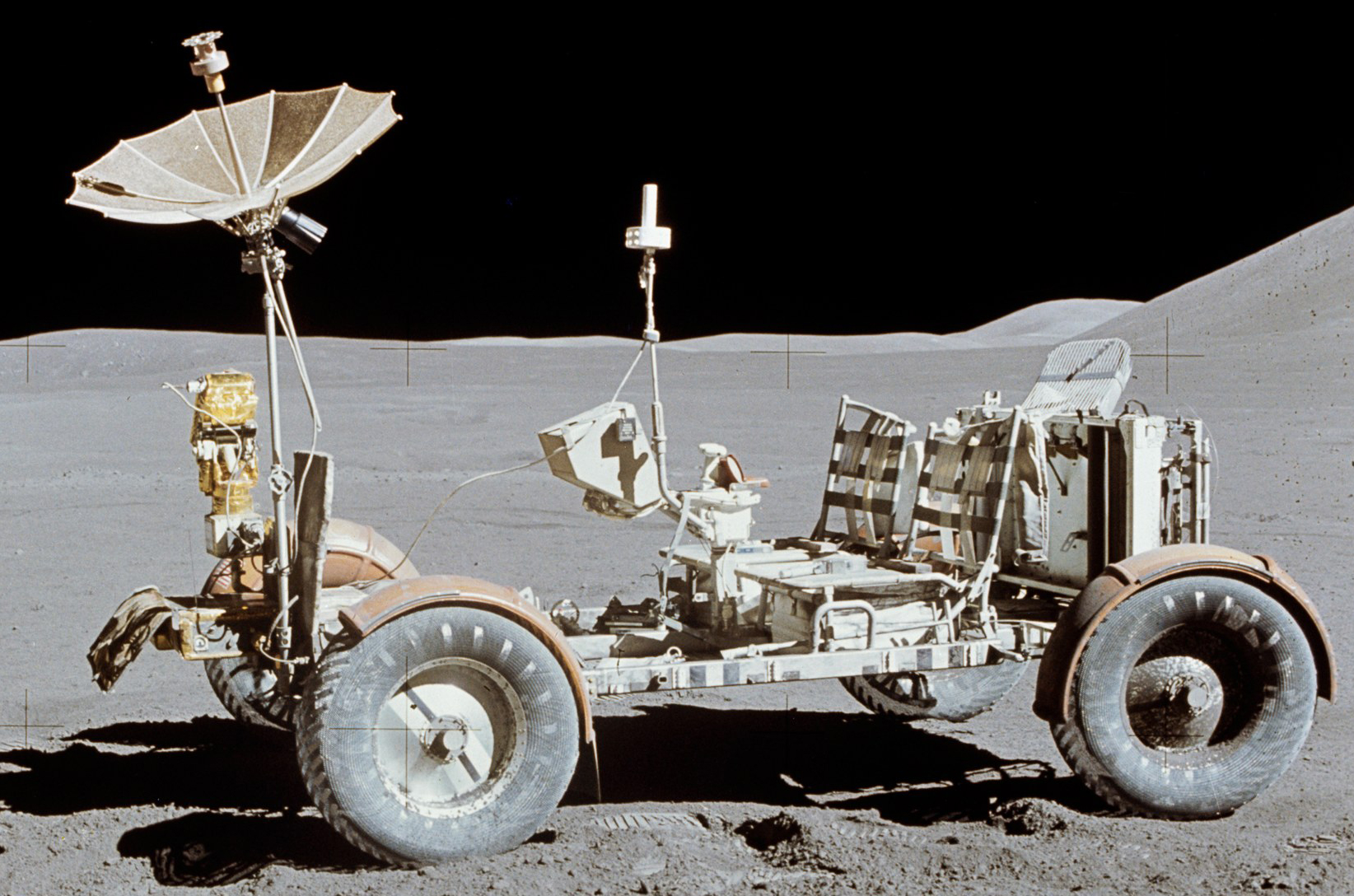
The U.S. Apollo Lunar Roving Vehicle from Apollo 15 on the Moon in 1971

- Bennett buggy, a Canadian, depression era term for an automobile pulled by a horse
- Dune buggy, designed for use on sand dunes
- Baja Bug, a modified Volkswagen Beetle
- Moon buggy, nickname for the Lunar Roving Vehicle used on the Moon during the Apollo program's Apollo 15, Apollo 16, and Apollo 17 missions
- Sandrail, a variant of the dune buggy
- Swamp buggy, designed for use in swamps
- Rock buggy, designed for use in low-speed rock-crawling applications
- Rock bouncer, designed for use in high-speed rock-crawling/bashing or very steep, off-road hillclimb racing, typically tubular steel exoskeleton, 1000hp V8 petrol engine

== See also ==
- American (1902 automobile)
- Buckeye gasoline buggy
- Citroën C-Buggy
- High wheeler
- Kite buggy
- Truggy
- Volkswagen Type 181
- Volkswagen Country Buggy
