= American (1902 automobile) =

Defunct American motor vehicle manufacturer

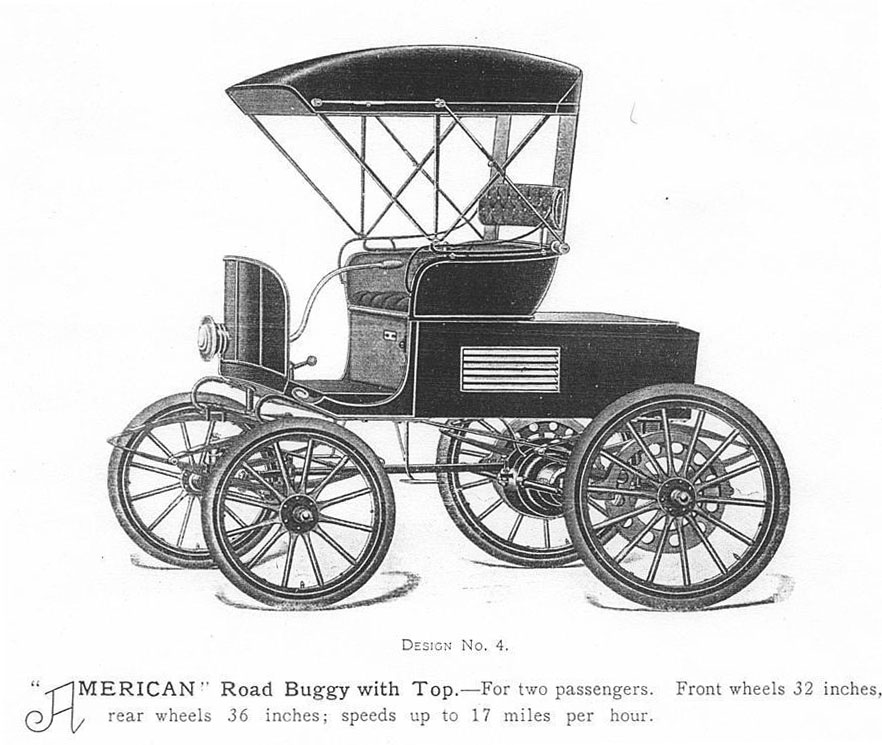
1902 American

The American, often nicknamed as the American Gas, was a small gasoline-powered buggy manufactured by the American Motor Carriage Company in Cleveland from 1902 to 1903, and sold until early 1904. It was one of nearly two dozen United States automobile marques to bear this name.

The company evolved in August 1901 from an interior decorating studio. Its president was George F. McKay, with F.D. Dorman as vice president and general manager, J.F. Morris acting as secretary-treasurer and George H. Wadsworth as superintendent.

The car was developed by chief engineer George W. Dunham. It was a light (1000 lb) two-passenger runabout with a water-cooled, 7-horsepower (5.2 kW) single-cylinder engine fitted under the seat, a planetary transmission and a single chain to the rear axle. The wheel base was 72 inches (180 cm). The most outstanding item of the vehicle was its wheel-steering device. A 7-gallon fuel tank was fitted, which would give a driving range of about 150 miles (240 km). As usual at the time, the car was right-hand driven. Minimalistic coachwork included a small compartment in front. The car came painted in "French carmine", with the running gear in "Valentine red", and the seat bench trimmed in black leather. The car's initial price was $1000, and the company came never close to the targeted capacity of 200 cars per year.

In September 1903, the company came under receivership management by the Prudential Trust Company. Dunham became general manager, looking to assemble as many cars as possible from parts ready. These were sold for $750 until April 1904, when a new company named American Automobile Company moved in. They never produced a car.

Press noted that the American Motor Carriage Company was the first automobile manufacturer in Cleveland that failed. This is not true, but it was the most important by then.
