= Volkswagen Australia =

Australian manufacturer of automobiles

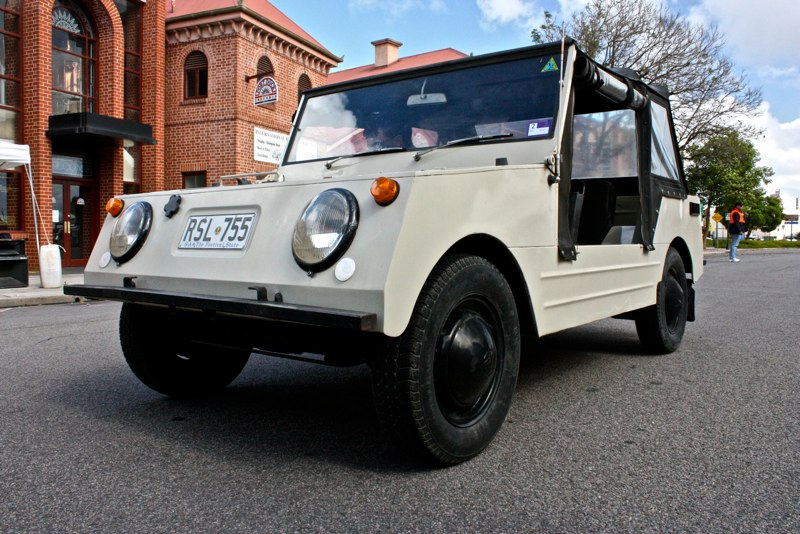
The Volkswagen Country Buggy was a product of Volkswagen Australia

Volkswagen Australia Ltd was formed in 1957 by Volkswagen AG of Germany and various Australian state Volkswagen distributors. The company acquired the vehicle assembly facilities of Martin & King at Clayton in Victoria, that site having been used for local assembly of the Volkswagen Beetle since 1954. By 1960 sheet metal panels were being pressed at Clayton and by 1967 the engine and most components were being produced there.

In 1967 Volkswagen Australia developed a unique model, the Country Buggy, which used components from the Beetle and the Kombi.

Due to falling sales the operation reverted to assembly only in 1968. A new company, Motor Producers Limited was formed and operations were expanded to include Datsun and Volvo models as well as Volkswagens. The factory was sold to Nissan in 1976 and Australian assembly of Volkswagens ended shortly after. Volvos continued to be assembled up until 1988, and Nissans until 1992.
