= Volkswagen Country Buggy =

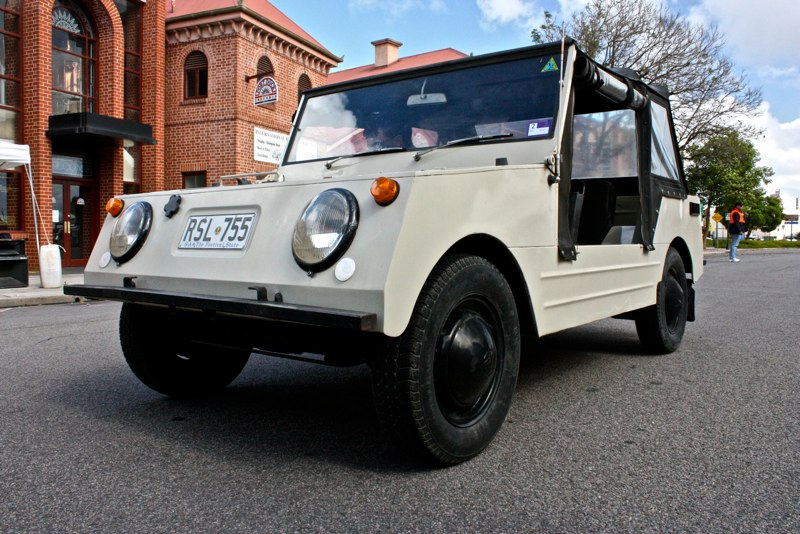

Overview
- Manufacturer: Volkswagen
- Also called: DMG/Volkswagen SKB 815; Sakbayan
- Production: 1967–1968 (Australia); 1,956 built; 1968–1980 (Philippines)
- Assembly: Australia: Clayton; Philippines: Mandaluyong (CKD)

Body and chassis
- Class: Ute
- Body style: 2-door utility roadster
- Layout: RR layout
- Platform: Type 1

Powertrain
- Engine: 1285 cc air-cooled H4; 1192 cc air-cooled H4
- Transmission: 4-speed manual

Dimensions
- Wheelbase: 2,400 mm (94.5 in)
- Length: 3,718 mm (146.4 in)
- Width: 1,643 mm (64.7 in)
- Height: 1,557 mm (61.3 in) (windshield up); 1,191 mm (47 in) (windshield down)
- Curb weight: 774 kg (1,706.4 lb)

The Volkswagen Country Buggy is a small utility vehicle designed and built by Volkswagen in Australia. It used parts from the existing Type 1 and Type 2. Production ran from 1967 to 1968. A derivative of the Country Buggy called the Sakbayan was built in the Philippines for several years until 1980.

== History ==
In the early 1960s Volkswagen Australia Ltd. began work on a new vehicle for use by the Australian Army that could also be sold to the general public. The military's requirements were for an amphibious four-wheel drive vehicle able to cope with the Australian environment. Design of the car was handled by project head Rudi Herzmer, who was also Volkswagen Australasia's Managing Director, and Engineer Cyril Harcourt at VW Australia's Clayton factory. The project was given the development name Kurierwagen, and some drawings for the project were done by 1964. A prototype was completed by late 1965, and two more followed. Testing of the three prototypes ran from 1965 through 1967, with Test Engineer Paul Kochan recording the results of 50,000 km (31,000 mi) of road tests.

To get corporate approval for the project, two of the prototypes were shipped to Wolfsburg for evaluation. When Herzmer, who had accompanied the prototypes, arrived in Germany with the cars he discovered that VW had begun development of a similar vehicle that would become the Volkswagen 181. Volkswagen Germany gave approval for the project to go ahead, subject to the incorporation of a list of required changes.

Australian Volkswagen dealers got their first view of one of the prototypes at the National Dealer Convention in February 1967, and the public first saw it at the Melbourne auto show in March of the same year. By this time the "Kurierwagen" name had been dropped and the new vehicle, designated Type 197, was now called the Country Buggy. The Country Buggy entered production in July 1967, but was not released to the public until 3 April 1968. This delay allowed the factory to resolve several problems that testing had uncovered.

As the final version had neither four-wheel drive nor the ability to stay afloat, none were ever bought by the military.

By 1967 Volkswagen Australasia was in difficulty. The company posted a loss of $2.6 million for the year, and fell to sixth in sales volume behind Toyota. A team of auditors from VW in Germany visited the Clayton plant. They identified the high level of investment needed to qualify for the Australian government's "Plan A" requirement of 95% local content as a reason that the product line was not keeping up with changes coming from Germany. They recommended withdrawal from "Plan A", cessation of all local manufacturing and conversion of the Australian division to assembly of cars supplied from German plants in Complete Knock Down (CKD) form under the Australian "SV Plan", that only required 60% local content. In July 1968 the company accepted the recommendation of the auditors and announced that local manufacturing would end. Volkswagen Australasia would be dissolved and replaced by a new company called "Motor Products Limited" that would be wholly owned by the German parent company. The new company would own and operate the Clayton plant to assemble CKD kits and take on contract assembly for other customers.

After only eight months and completion of 842 cars, the decision was made to phase out production of the Country Buggy. Production stopped in September or October 1968, but the factory continued to supply CKD kits until the existing inventory of parts was used up, which lasted until 1970. During this time another 181 vehicles were built for export.

The number of Country Buggies built totaled 1956 units, of which 459 units were sent in CKD form to countries like Singapore, New Zealand, some small Pacific nations, and, most significantly, the Philippines. The exported units included left-hand drive cars.

A registry of Country Buggies lists 363 vehicles, many of which are recorded as having been scrapped or of unknown location.

== Features ==
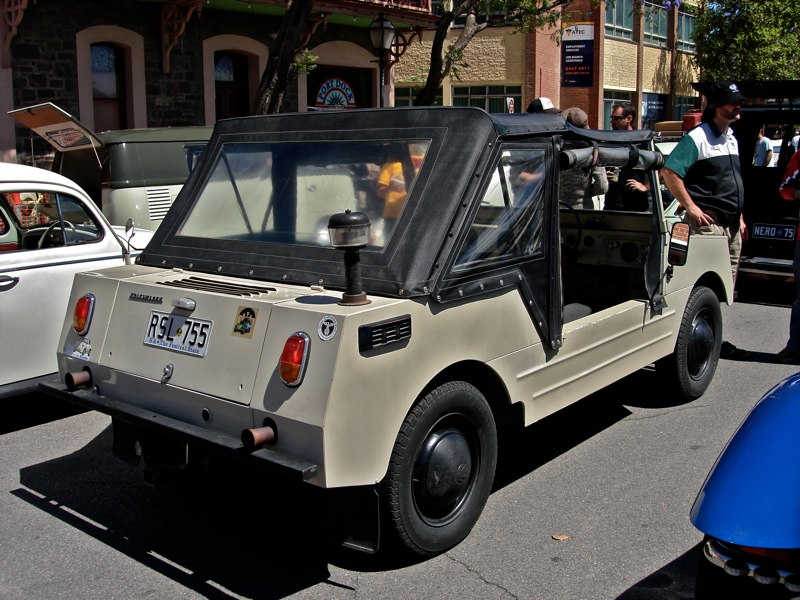
Volkswagen Country Buggy rear view

The Country Buggy was built on an Australian-made Type 1 chassis, which the company described as a "tubular centre section frame with welded-on platform". The bodywork was designed and made in Australia, and was of folded flat steel. The car had very high sills on the left and right side, and no doors. The windscreen could be folded flat. The headlamps were sourced from the Type 1 and were mounted on the flat sloping nose. Front and rear overhangs were short, permitting an angle of approach (laden) of 51°30' and an angle of departure (laden) of 32°. To keep it from bottoming out the exhaust exited through openings let into the bodywork above the rear bumper. Front track for the Country Buggy was 1,376 mm (54.2 in), while the rear measurement was 1,360 mm (53.5 in). Ground clearance was 234 mm (9.2 in), and the maximum payload was 366 kg (807 lb).

Suspension front and rear was by transverse torsion springs and trailing arms, but with the trailing arms from the first-generation Type 2 T1 (1950–1967) at the front and the portal axles used on both the Type 82 Kübelwagen and early Type 2 on the rear hubs. These two changes combined to raise the ride height to 230 mm (9.1 in).

The steering box and the windscreen wiper assemblies came from the Type 3. Electrics were a 6-volt system.

Power was provided by Volkswagen's air-cooled four-cylinder boxer engine. Two engines were available. The standard engine had a bore and stroke of 77 mm × 69 mm (3.0 in × 2.7 in), displaced 1,285 cc (78.4 cu in) and developed SAE 50 bhp at 4600 rpm or DIN 40 bhp at 4000. The optional engine had a stroke of 64 mm (2.5 in), for a correspondingly smaller displacement of 1,192 cc (72.7 cu in). Power was reduced to SAE 41.5 bhp at 3900 rpm and DIN 34 bhp at 3600 rpm.

Power was delivered to the rear wheels by the 4-speed manual transaxle and swing axles from the Type 1. The tires were 5.60 x 15 on all four corners. Brakes front and rear were 250 mm (9.84 in) drums. Fuel capacity was 40 L (8.8 imp gal).

Apart from the smaller engine, available options included a soft top, a hard top, side curtains, winter tyres, interior sun visors, an external rear-view mirror, an engine guard, a front towing eyelet and a power take off. A limited-slip differential was reportedly planned for future release. No heater was available. The price of the base 1300 cc version was AUS$1598.00.

== Sakbayan ==
In 1968 Volkswagen distributor DMG Inc. began to import the Country Buggy to the Philippines. Due to import restrictions the vehicles were shipped in CKD kit form, with final assembly done by DMG. The early Philippine models were advertised as Country Buggies and were mechanically identical to the Australian models with the exception of being configured for left-hand drive. They also incorporated a percentage of locally sourced parts.

After Australian production of the Country Buggy stopped the supply of kits for the Philippine market continued for a time but was eventually exhausted. DMG sourced new major components from Germany, using the chassis and engine from the Type 181. A copy of the Country Buggy body was produced locally. In April 1972 it was announced that four major automobile manufacturers would be making significant investments in Philippine auto production. The announcement stated that Volkswagen would invest over US$6,000,000 in a joint venture with DMG Inc. to build a car called the Sakbayan 817. Some government documents use the same designation. Early advertising for the Philippine version of the car used the name Sakbayan 815, or SKB 815. Eventually this model was simply known as the Sakbayan.

The word Sakbayan is a portmanteau of the Tagalog words "sasakyán" ("vehicle") and "bayan" ("country", "people", or "town"). The name is a calque of the German Volkswagen, which means "people's car". This vehicle is considered by many to be the first car to be both designed and built in the Philippines. Philippine advertising for the Sakbayan described it as an "All-Around" vehicle and used the slogan "It combines the stamina of a truck with the economy of a small car".

The Philippine-built bodywork was distinguishable from the original Country Buggy by only having one raised strake low on the side of the body, rather than the two on the Australian original. Other differences included the former Beetle-sourced headlamps having been replaced with units that were slightly inset, and the availability of a new hardtop.

After a few years of production using the German-sourced parts DMG switched sources and began basing the Sakbayan on parts from Volkswagen do Brasil, which necessitated another minor redesign.

With the changes to the platform came changes to some dimensions. A later copy of the Sakbayan Owners' Manual reports that while the wheelbase remained at 2,400 mm (94.5 in) and length was approximately the same at 3,720 mm (146.5 in), width had dropped to 1,570 mm (61.8 in) and height to 1,500 mm (59.1 in) with the hardtop roof. Tracks front and rear were 1,310 mm (51.6 in) and 1,350 mm (53.1 in) respectively. Ground clearance was down to 202 mm (8.0 in), while the angle of approach had been reduced to 37° and the angle of departure was down to 23°. The early Sakbayans used the 1600 cc air-cooled four, while the later models used an engine of 1500 cc.

During the 1970s the Philippine Long Distance Telephone Company (PLDT) bought large numbers Sakbayan from DMG, which were used by PLDT staff as service and maintenance vehicles until the mid-eighties, after which they were phased out. Sakbayans were also used in the fleet of the government owned Philippine National Bank.

Sakbayans are being restored in the Philippines partly due to interest in the original Volkswagen Beetle. Surviving Sakbayans typically come in one of two types of body styles:

- a two-door coupé with windows and doors
- a roofed version of the coupé without doors, much like a jeep

In the 1973 Pam Grier film Black Mama, White Mama, several Sakbayans were seen as police vehicles. The film was shot in the Philippines.

== Major variations ==
Version	1	2	2A	3	3A
Common name	Country Buggy	Sakbayan			
Major components country of origin	Australia	Germany		Brasil	
Years of production (estimated)	1967-1968/70	1971-72	1973	1974-1980	
Platform	Type 1	Type 181		Type 1	Type 321
Layout	Rear-engine, rear-wheel-drive layout				
Engine	Volkswagen air-cooled 4-cylinder boxer gasoline engine				
Bore x stroke	77 mm x 69 mm (Standard); 77 mm x 64 mm (Optional)	85.5 mm x 69 mm		83 mm x 69 mm	
Displacement	1285 cc (Standard); 1192 cc (Optional)	1585 cc (Dual port)		1493 cc (Single port)	
Transmission	4-speed manual transaxle				
Rear drive axle	Swing-axle		Independent (IRS)	Swing-axle	
Portal axles	Yes		No		
Braking	Type 2 drums	Type 181 drums		Type 1 drums	
Wheel size	15 inches	14 inches		15 inches	
Number of wheel studs	5			4	
