= Bushranger (disambiguation) =

A bushranger was a lawbreaker who used the Australian bush to avoid capture.

Bushranger(s) may also refer to:

- Bush Ranger (car), limited production off-road vehicle based on a Range Rover platform
- Bushranger (American horse) (1930–37), American racehorse
- Bushranger (Irish horse) (born 2006), Irish racehorse
- Bushranger, popular nickname given to the Australian Bell UH-1 Iroquois helicopters during the Vietnam War
- Bushranger, the Norinco JW-103 rifle
- Bushrangers, Australian rules football team in the AFLQ State Association
- North East Bushrangers, Australian basketball team
- Victorian Bushrangers, Australian cricket team

== See also ==
- Bush Pioneer, financial supporter of George W. Bush
- The Bushranger (disambiguation)
