= CZ 457 =

Czech firearm

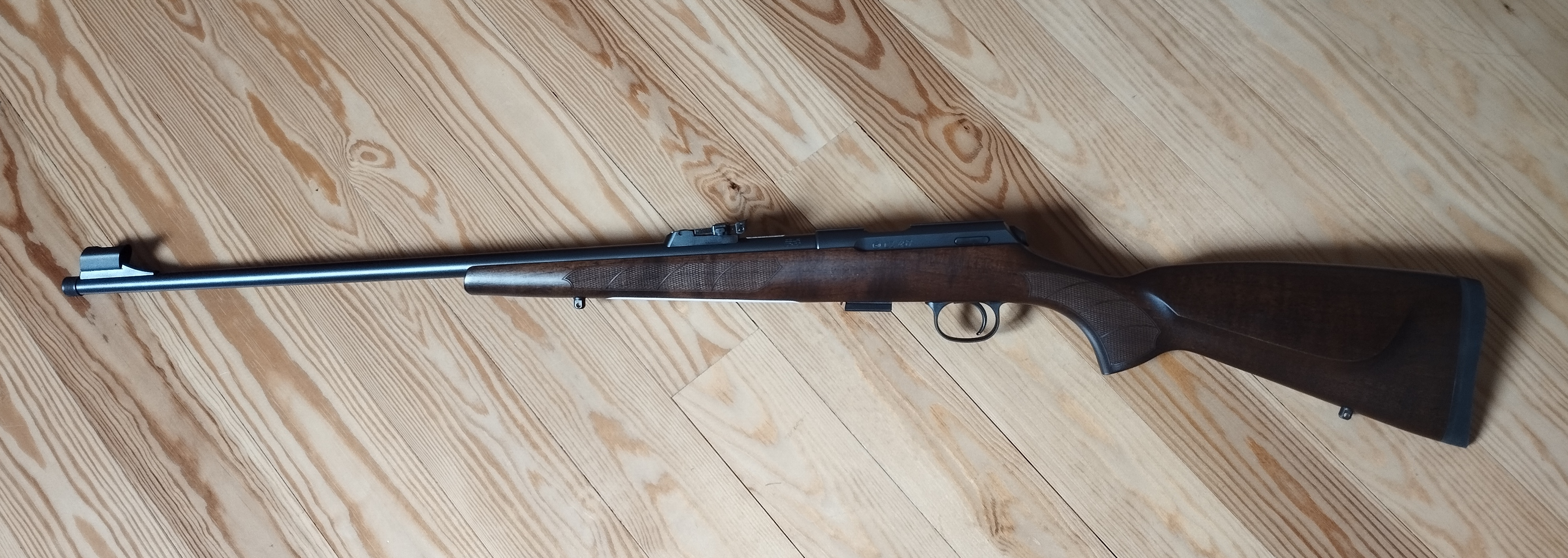
- CZ 457 Luxe version in .22 Long Rifle
- Type: Hunting/Target rifle
- Place of origin: Czech Republic

Production history
- Manufacturer: Česká zbrojovka Uherský Brod
- Produced: 2019–present
- Variants: Synthetic, Training Rifle, Varmint, American, Luxury (Luxe), MTR, Jaguar, Premium

Specifications
- Length: varies with barrel length
- Barrel length: 16 in (410 mm) to 28.6 in (730 mm) dependent on model
- Cartridge: .22 Long Rifle, .22 WMR, .17 HMR
- Action: Bolt-action
- Feed system: 5 rounds (standard); 10-, 15- and 25-round magazines and single-shot magazine adapters optional
- Sights: open (some models); 11 mm dovetail rail for optical sights

The CZ 457 is a series of magazine-fed bolt-action rimfire repeating rifle manufactured by the Czech firearms manufacturer Česká zbrojovka Uherský Brod and imported into the United States by CZ-USA.

The barrel of the CZ 457 can be easily changed and replaced with other barrels designed for rimfire ammunition. Given the removable barrel, commonality with the CZ 455, as well as a compact trigger group, aftermarket parts are available both in the American and European sporting market.

There are also different Scope mount ring or Rimfire scope that are compatible with the CZ 457

The CZ 457 is widely used in shooting sports due to its accuracy.

== History ==
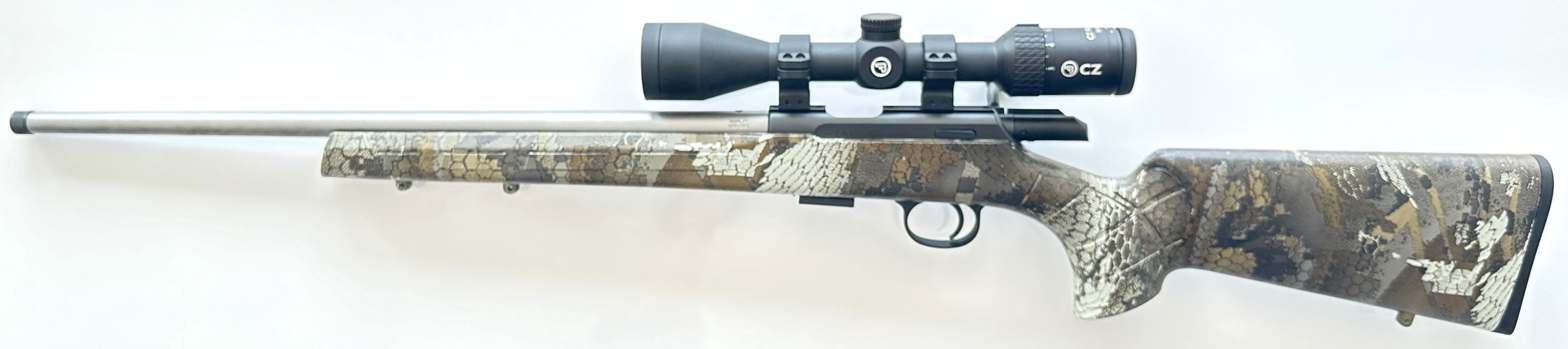
CZ 457 Stainless

The CZ 457 was designed to improve on the popular CZ 455 rifle family, notably the inclusion of a push-to-fire safety in line with the barrel, and replacement of the 455 stamped steel unitary bottom. Bolt rotation was also reduced to 60° from 90° in the 455. Trigger adjustment is also claimed to be improved. The rifle (with its respective barrel) can be chambered for .22 LR, .22 WMR & .17 HMR.

== Developments ==
- Under metal guard
- 60° breech lever opening
- Barrel and receiver with anti-corrosion surface treatment
- Possibility of dry firing without damaging the firing pin
- Side safety (push and shoot type)
- Arming indicator
- Charger compatible with models: CZ 452 and CZ 455
- Adjustable trigger (weight from 900g to 1500g) and bump from 0.5mm to 5mm

== Variants ==
| | BarrelType | Barrel length (mm) | Length (mm) | Weight (kg) | Butt | Blade area | Sight | Caliber(s) |
|---|---|---|---|---|---|---|---|---|
| CZ 457 Varmint | heavy | 525 | 981 | 3.3 | nut | varnish | not | .22 LR.22 Magnum.17 HMR |
| CZ 457 Varmint Synthetic | heavy | 412.5 | 865 | 2.6 | polymer | soft-touch | not | .22 LR.22 Magnum.17 HMR |
| CZ 457 Synthetic 16" | light | 412.5 | 865 | 2.5 | polymer | soft-touch | not | .22 LR |
| CZ 457 Synthetic 20" | light | 525 | 977 | 2.5 | polymer | soft-touch | not | .22 LR.22 Magnum.17 HMR |
| CZ 457 MTR 16" | heavy | 412.5 | 854 | 3.9 | nut | oil | not | .22 LR |
| CZ 457 MTR 20" | heavy | 525 | 967 | 3.9 | nut | oil | not | .22 LR |
| CZ 457 Training Rifle | light | 630 | 1085 | 3.1 | beech | varnish | yes | .22 LR |
| CZ 457 American | light | 630 | 1087 | 3 | nut | varnish | not | .22 LR.22 Magnum.17 HMR |
| CZ 457 Premium | light | 630 | 1084 | 2.9 | nut | oil | yes | .22 LR.22 Magnum.17 HMR |
| CZ 457 Lux | light | 630 | 1088 | 2.9 | nut | varnish | yes | .22 LR.22 Magnum.17 HMR |
| CZ 457 Jaguar XII | light | 630 | 1084 | | nut | oil | yes | .22 LR.22 Magnum.17 HMR |
| CZ 457 Royal | light | 412.5 | 857 | 2.9 | nut | oil | not | .22 LR.22 Magnum.17 HMR |
| CZ 457 Stainless | light | 525 | 977 | 2.5 | polymer | soft-touch | not | .22 LR |
| CZ 457 MDT | heavy | 525 | 1010 | 3.4 | durable | serakot | not | .22 LR |
| CZ 457 Thumbhole 16" | heavy | 412.5 | 885 | 3.2 | laminated | varnish | not | .22 LR |
| CZ 457 Thumbhole 20" | heavy | 525 | 997 | 3.6 | laminated | varnish | not | .22 LR.22 Magnum.17 HMR |
| CZ 457 LRP Black | heavy | 525 | 1010 | 3.9 | beech | soft-touch | not | .22 LR |
| CZ 457 Carbon | light | 525 | 977 | 2.15 | polymer | soft-touch | not | .22 LR |
| CZ 457 At-one | heavy | 525 | 938-982 | 3.5 | laminated | varnish | not | .22 LR |

== See also ==
- CZ 452
- CZ 453
- CZ 455
