= Australian Air Force Cadets =

Youth military organisation of the Royal Australian Air Force

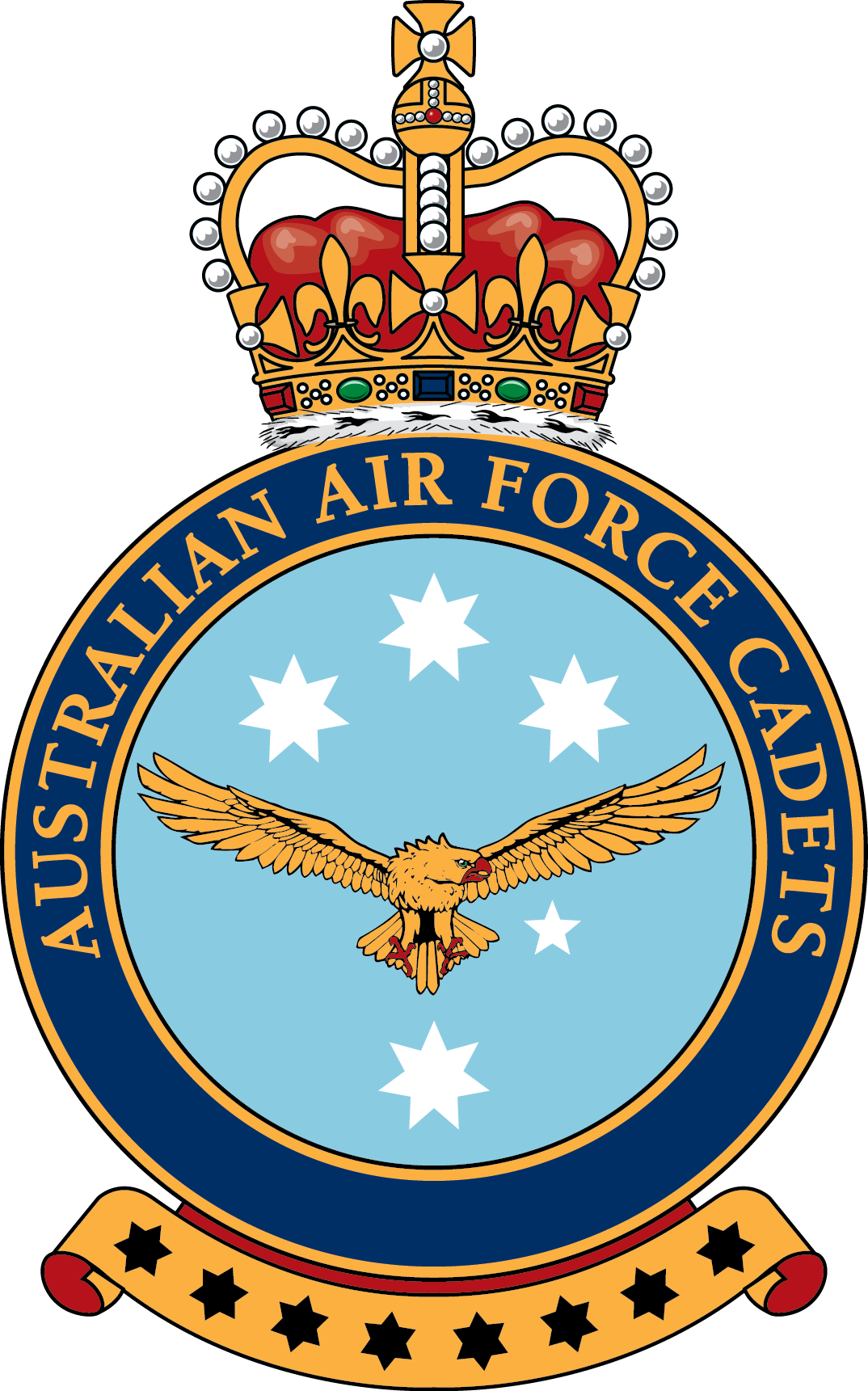
- Founded: February 1941; 85 years ago
- Country: Australia
- Allegiance: Royal Australian Air Force
- Role: Volunteer youth organisation
- Size: Cadets: 9,500+ (October 2024); Number of squadrons: ~144; Adult Volunteers: ~1,200
- Part of: Australian Defence Force Cadets
- Headquarters: Headquarters Australian Air Force Cadets - Building F4, level 2 28 Scherger Drive Fairbairn ACT 2610
- Mottos: Inspiring today, leading tomorrow
- Website: airforcecadets.gov.au

Commanders
- Director General Cadets – Air Force: Air Commodore Anthony Bull
- Commander – Australian Air Force Cadets: Group Captain (AAFC) Kylie Walker

The Australian Air Force Cadets (AAFC), known as the Air Training Corps (AIRTC) until 2001, is a federally supported youth development program and organisation of the Royal Australian Air Force. Along with the Australian Army Cadets (AAC) and the Australian Navy Cadets (ANC), it is part of the Australian Defence Force Cadets (ADFC).

== History ==
=== Founding of the Air Training Corps ===
The Air Training Corps (ATC), predecessor to the Australian Air Force Cadets, was formed by the Australian War Cabinet in February 1941 as a cadet corps part of the Royal Australian Air Force (RAAF) reserves. The main aims of the force were to train young men from ages 16 to 18 to join the RAAF in the midst of World War II, and for young men to increase their "air knowledge" and interest in the RAAF. The personnel strength of the ATC peaked at 12000 cadets in training in 1943.

=== Post-War period and brief disbandment ===
After the end of World War II, the ATC was scaled down from the lack of demand of RAAF pilots by demobilisation, and its aims were changed for a peacetime role, for training cadets to eventually join the peacetime RAAF.

In August 1975, the then Minister for Defence, Bill Morrison, announced that the three branches of cadet corps, Australian Cadet Corps, Sea Cadet Corps, and Air Training Corps would be disbanded from January 1976, based on the recommendations of the Millar Report of 1975. However, in May 1976, the new Federal Government Minister for Administrative Services announced the re-formation of the Australian cadets movement, and the ATC acronym was renamed AIRTC.

=== Post-disbandment to the modern Australian Air Force Cadets ===
In May 1982, the Minister for Defence announced the inclusion of girls in the AIRTC.

In January 2000, based on recommendations from the Topley Review, a national Directorate of Defence Force Cadets was formed to administer cadet units. The following year, the separate state cadet organisations, with little consistencies in training, standards, or organisations, and were not managed under the Australian Defence Force, were administered under a national administration. The name of Air Training Corps was also then changed to Australian Air Force Cadets (AAFC).

In 2005, the AAFC was re-organised into functional wings, supported by the RAAF. These wings and their boundaries remained mainly defined by political state lines, redirected for better service delivery and focus.

== Philosophy ==
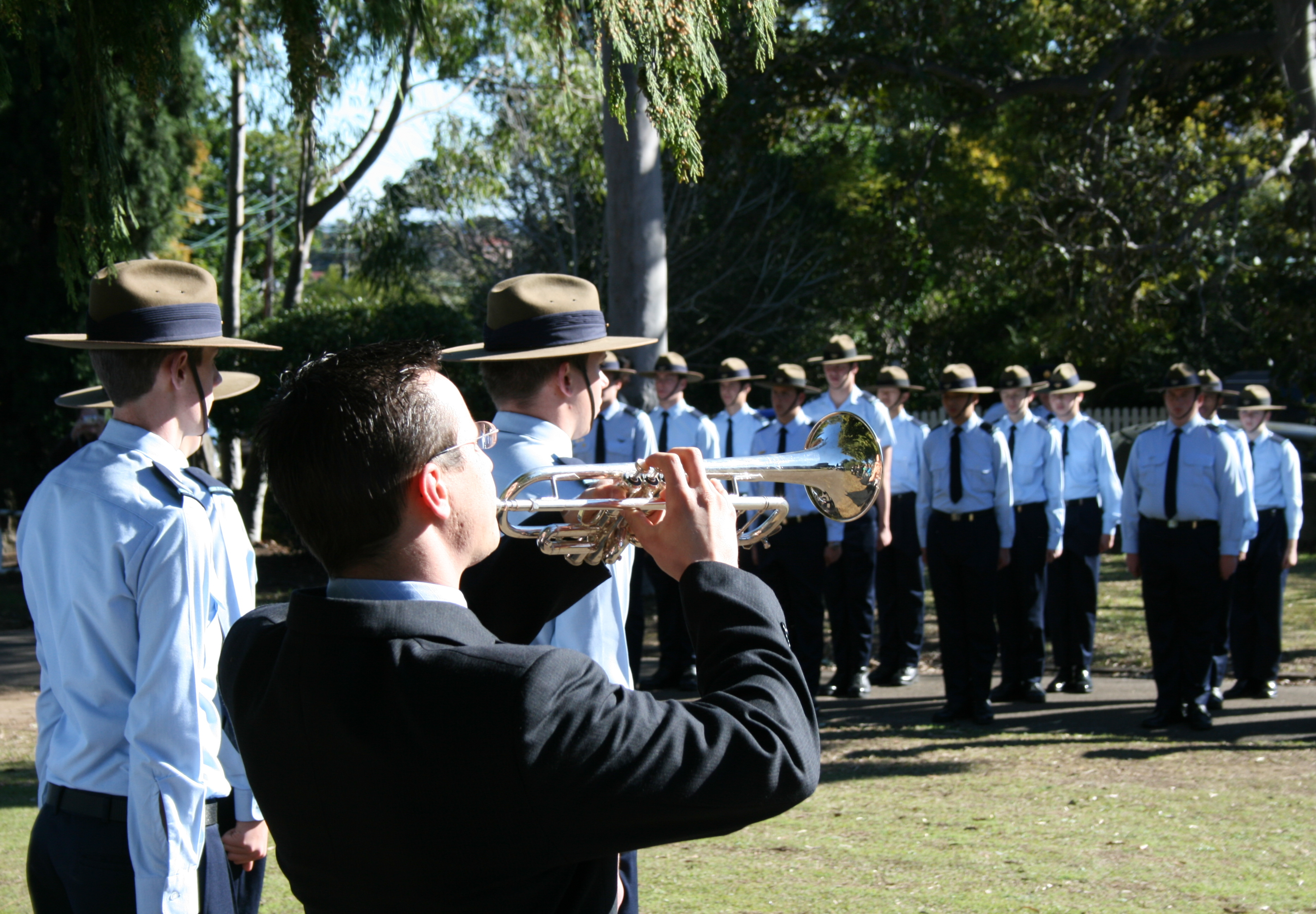
Australian Air Force Cadets wearing the long-sleeved service dress; parading at the memorial outside St John's Ashfield

The broad aim of the Australian Air Force Cadets is to better equip young people for community life by fostering initiative, leadership, discipline, and loyalty through a training program designed to stimulate an interest in the Royal Australian Air Force. The training program is structured to reflect the following objectives:

- To give Cadets a foundation of Air Force knowledge and discipline;
- To develop the qualities of leadership, initiative, and self-reliance;
- To develop good character and good citizenship in the widest sense;
- To develop an interest in the Royal Australian Air Force and aviation generally;
- To instil a knowledge of the history of aviation; and
- To encourage Cadets to continue an active interest in aviation into their adult life.

== Uniform ==
The AAFC uniform is near-identical to its parent organisation, using the RAAF General Purpose Uniform (GPU) and Service Dress (SD). Before the issuing of GPU uniform, the Disruptive Pattern Camouflage Uniform (DPCU) was used. The differences between AAFC and RAAF uniform are badges, shoulder biscuits, pocket tags, and rank slides, the former's being embroidered with a blue/white band with the acronym AAFC.

The Service Dress Air Force Blue (SD) uniform is the uniform worn on most ceremonial occasions. Cadet Under Officers and Cadet Warrant Officers may wear the RAAF Peaked Cap. The headdress worn by cadets consists of the Hat Fur Felt - Khaki (HFF-K) and a AAFC- or squadron-branded baseball cap, that is only to be used with the GPU. Officers and Instructors of Cadets may wear the above headdress or RAAF garrison caps.

From early 2021, the AAFC superseded the DPCU uniform and replaced it with the General Purpose Uniform (GPU), the current issued uniform of the RAAF. AAFC Personnel are issued their respective squadron patch, which typically contain a blue background with various symbols to represent the location that they are at and known for, with the exception of certain squadrons and flights.

== Training ==
=== Cadet home training ===
A cadet traditionally progresses through several phases of training throughout their cadet career. Standard training is on the fundamentals and development of military drill, aerospace, and skills on the field, whilst extension trainings, a prerequisite for progressing in rank, develop on leadership skills and concepts, as well as the aforementioned subjects in a leadership context.

=== Cadet external training ===
Cadet external training usually constitutes training on a Royal Australian Air Force establishment or a remote location for fieldcraft camps, usually done in conjunction with other units. These activities include General Service Trainings (GST) for cadets to learn about Defence and happenings on a RAAF airbase, Cadet Flying Trainings (CST) to train cadets in piloting various aircraft, and Fieldcraft camps to extend on core field skills training.

=== Foot drill in the Australian Air Force Cadets ===
AAFC training constitutes much training on foot drill (mentioned as "Drill and Ceremonial"), ranging from basic "static" drill movements in initial phases to advanced banner, Rifle and sword drill with later stages.

AAFC squadrons often form guards and banner parties at Anzac/Remembrance Day/Victory in the Pacific Day/Vietnam Veterans Day services and other cadets will march on these parades. Promotion course graduation parades are very significant events, often requiring days of training. These parades will often be reviewed by a senior RAAF officer and consist of several squadrons/flights as well as colour parties. Ceremonial parades may include firearms, with Lee Enfields, L1A1 rifles, or innocuous versions of the F88 Austeyr (abbreviated as the F88I), and swords for executives. Colour party members are often temporarily issued ceremonial equipment such as White cotton gloves, Banner Girdle (for Banner/Colour Bearer) or Sash (Banner/Colour Warrant Officer) and white belts.

== Ranks ==
The ranks of the Australian Air Force Cadets (AAFC) are closely based on the ranks of the Royal Australian Air Force (RAAF). As such, a system of differentiation was required to distinguish members of the AAFC from those of the RAAF. This means that cadet ranks wear rank slides which are AFB (Air Force Blue) with an embroidered light blue ribbon, 1cm wide at the base of the rank slide with 'AAFC' in AFB embroidery. Adult staff members of the AAFC wear rank slides with an embroidered white bar that contains the letters AAFC in place of the light blue bar. When DPCU uniforms became standard issue, cadets and cadet staff would wear surplus Australian RAAF and Australian Army Rank slides. These would be replaced in 2014 with the "AAFC" styled DPCU rank slide. Adult ranks are also followed by the letters AAFC (in brackets) when written, to distinguish them from actual members of the RAAF. Cadet Non-Commissioned Officer ranks are prefixed with the letter C, to identify them as cadets and not adult staff or members of the RAAF.

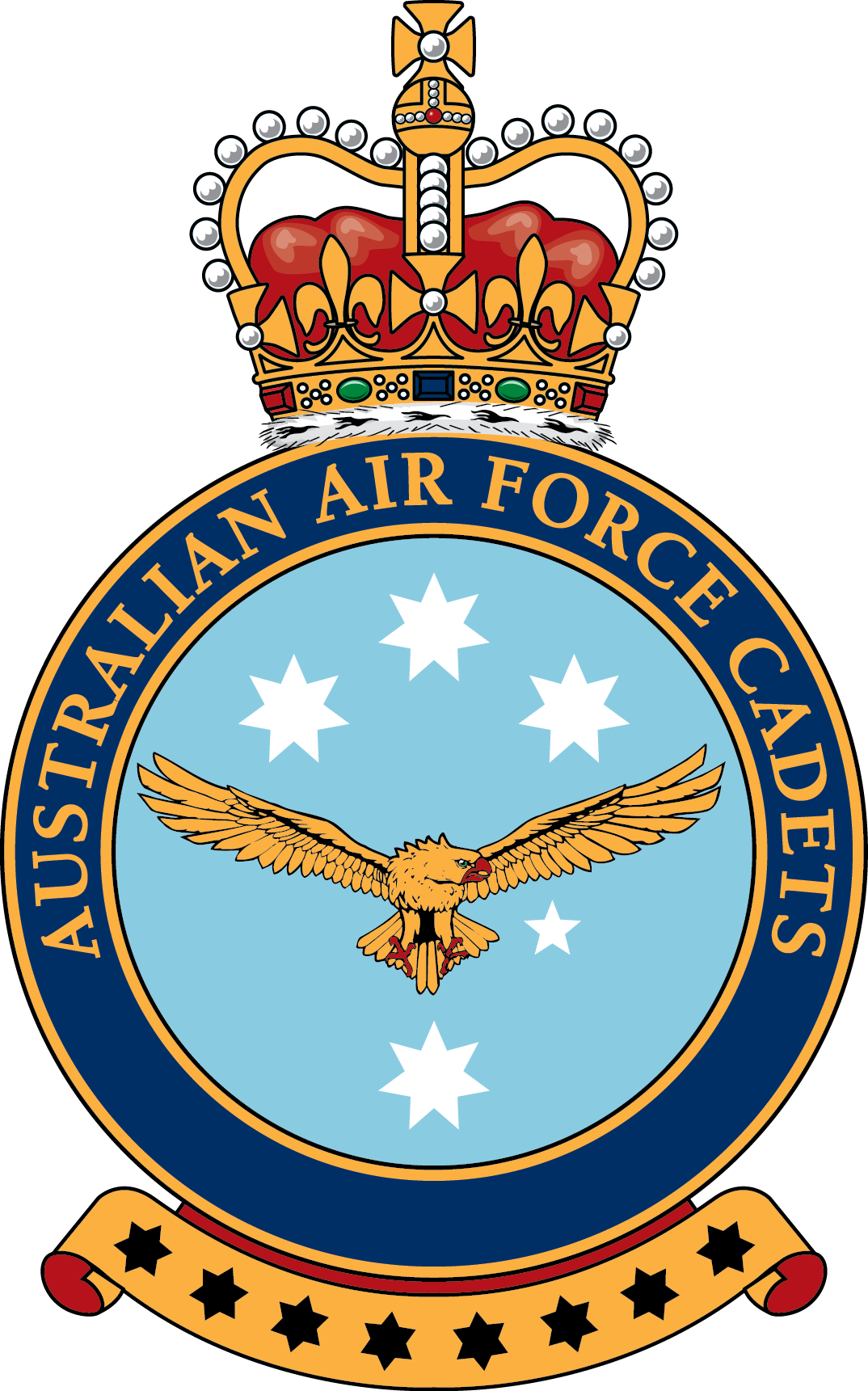
| ADFC Cadets | CDT 9 (Special Grade) | CDT 8 | CDT 7 | CDT 6 | CDT 5 | CDT 4 | CDT 3 | CDT 2 | CDT 1 | CDT (R) |
|---|---|---|---|---|---|---|---|---|---|---|
| Australian Air Force Cadets | No equivalent | | | | | | No equivalent | | | No insignia |
| Australian Air Force Cadets | No equivalent | Cadet Under Officer | Cadet Warrant Officer | Cadet Flight Sergeant | Cadet Sergeant | Cadet Corporal | No equivalent | Leading Cadet | Cadet | Cadet Recruit |
| Australian Air Force Cadets | No equivalent | CUO | CWOFF | CFSGT | CSGT | CCPL | No equivalent | LCDT | CDT | CDTRCT |

- Recruit (RCT) is not an official rank, but commonly refers to new cadets who have been enrolled but have not yet finished "Recruit Stage" Training.

Instructor Ranks of the AAFC (Instructor of Cadets – IOC)
| Insignia | | | | | | |
| Rank | Warrant Officer (AAFC) | Flight Sergeant (AAFC) | Sergeant (AAFC) | Corporal (AAFC) | Leading Aircraftman; Leading Aircraftwoman (AAFC) | Aircraftman; Aircraftwoman (AAFC) |
| Abbreviation | WOFF(AAFC) | FSGT(AAFC) | SGT(AAFC) | CPL(AAFC) | LAC/W(AAFC) | AC/W(AAFC) |

Officer Ranks of the AAFC (Officer of Cadets – OOC)
| Insignia | | | | | | |
| Rank | Group Captain (AAFC) | Wing Commander (AAFC) | Squadron Leader (AAFC) | Flight Lieutenant (AAFC) | Flying Officer (AAFC) | Pilot Officer (AAFC) |
| Abbreviation | GPCAPT(AAFC) | WGCDR(AAFC) | SQNLDR(AAFC) | FLTLT(AAFC) | FLGOFF(AAFC) | PLTOFF(AAFC) |

=== Rank Establishments ===
The AAFC has specific rank establishments and quotas depending on the strength of a squadron. This is to ensure a balance between leadership roles and subordinates members (especially to prevent a top-heavy squadron developing). As an exaggerated example, it would not be beneficial for a squadron of 40 cadets to have 39 CUOs and 1 CDT, nor would it be beneficial for it to have 20 CWOFFs, 10 CFSGTs and 10 CSGTs. Rather, that squadron ought to have 2 CUOs, 2 CWOFFs, 1 CFSGT, 3 CSGTs, 5 CCPLs and around 30 LCDTs/CDTs. The general standard is 1–4 NCOs and CUOs, This is not an explicit rule of the AAFC, but is rather a recommendation made to units.

- Squadrons may not exceed the establishment for CUO and CWOFF positions. CUO positions do not cascade down to CWOFF positions if there are vacancies in CUO numbers.
- Squadrons may use vacancies in CFSGT and CSGT positions to cascade down to lower ranks to permit COs the option to fill vacancies in SNCO ranks with JNCOs.
- Vacancies in rank cannot cascade upwards at any time.
- This means that vacant CCPL positions remain that way at all times, and, for example, a squadron with an establishment for 75 cadets that have only 3 CSGTs could not assign those positions to CUO/CWOFF/CFSGT rank but could assign them to allow for more CCPLs.

=== Awards/Badges/Medals ===
| Award | Image | Staff | Cadet | Years service | Notes |
|---|---|---|---|---|---|
| Australian Cadet Forces Service Medal | Australian Cadet Forces Medal | All ranks | N/A | 15 Years Continuous service | Bar is awarded each five years after award |
| GST Completion Certificate | | N/A | All ranks | N/A | Awarded after GST course completion |
| JNCO Completion Certificate | | N/A | LCDT/CCPL | N/A | Awarded after JNCO course completion (Since 2024, JNCO Courses have ended, and is now unavailable to be awarded.) |
| SNCO Completion Certificate | | N/A | CCPL/CSGT | N/A | Awarded after SNCO course completion (Since 2024, SNCO Courses have ended, and is now unavailable to be awarded.) |
| CWOFF Completion Certificate | | N/A | CSGT/CFSGT/CWOFF | N/A | Awarded after CWOFF course completion (Since 2025, CWOFF Courses have ended, and is now unavailable to be awarded.) |
| Marksmanship Badge "Crossed Rifles" | Gilt Crossed Rifles | All ranks | All ranks above Cadet | 1 Year service | Awarded to Cadets who achieve an average score of 85% or higher at a Wing or National shooting competition. This comes in the form of two crossed Enfields |
| CUO Completion Certificate | | N/A | CSGT/CFSGT/CWOFF/CUO | N/A | Awarded after CUO course completion (Since 2025, CUO Courses have ended, and is now unavailable to be awarded.) |
| Firearms Proficiency Badge "Single Rifle" | Gilt Single Rifle | All ranks | All ranks | N/A | Awarded to Cadets who have been passed the firearms training elective (FTE) having fired at least 45 rounds |
| Silver Steyr Badge | Silver F-88 AusSteyr | All ranks | All ranks above Cadet | N/A | Awarded to Cadets who have completed the ADF F88 course |
| Golden Steyr Badge | Gilt F88 AusSteyr | All ranks | All ranks above Cadet | N/A | Awarded to Cadets who qualify as marksman on the ADF F88 |
| Band Badge | A gold badge in the shape of a lyre with AAFC on both sides. | All ranks | All ranks | N/A | Awarded to Cadets who have worked on at least 75% of official band parades |
| Adventure Training Badge | Gold Boomerang with the word "ADVENTURE" surmounted by the torch of learning. | All ranks | All ranks | N/A | Awarded to cadets who have completed the Adventure Training Award AAFC Staff may wear the ATA badge if they earned it as a cadet, however there is no option to be awarded the ATA badge as AAFC staff. |
| Individual Proficiency badge | The AAFC eagle surmounting a circle with 'Australian' above the Eagle and 'Air Force Cadets below in pewter. | All ranks | All ranks | 1 year of service, requalifying every year | Awarded annually to a Cadet, OOC/IOC who meets criteria based on Personal Standard, Active Program Participation, Personal and Organisational Development and Community or Public Ceremonial Activities |
| First Solo Badge | Dark silver wreath with an eagle outstreched across the centre and 'Australian Air Force Cadets' below. | All ranks | All ranks | 2 Years service | Awarded to cadets who have completed a solo flight either powered or glider |
| General Flying Proficiency Test Badge | An eagle with wings elevated and outstreched with 'AAFC' below. | All ranks | All ranks | 2 Years service | Awarded to cadets who have obtained an FAI "C" certificate for gliding |
| AAFC Wing Badge | Stylised pigeon wings with the AAFC Crest surmounted in the center. | All ranks | All ranks | 2 Years service | Awarded to cadets who hold a CPL or an AEI qualification for gliding |
| Three Bladed Prop | A blue three bladed prop on a circular gold background. | N/A | All ranks above LCDT | 2 Years service | Awarded to cadets who complete their proficiency stage training |
| Four Bladed Prop | A blue four bladed prop on a circular gold background. | N/A | All ranks above LCDT | 3 Years service | Awarded to cadets who complete their advanced stage training |
| National Badge of the AAFC | | All ranks | All ranks | N/A | Any cadet may wear this |
| Duke of Edinburgh Bronze | | N/A | All ranks | N/A | Awarded to cadets who complete the Duke of Edinburgh program and qualify for bronze |
| Duke of Edinburgh Silver | | N/A | All ranks | N/A | Awarded to cadets who complete the Duke of Edinburgh program and qualify for silver |
| Duke of Edinburgh Gold | | N/A | All ranks | N/A | Awarded to cadets who complete the Duke of Edinburgh program and qualify for gold |
| Ellie Tibble Award | | N/A | All ranks | N/A | Awarded to high-performing cadets representing the finest values and traditions of the organisation. |

== Organisation ==
=== National Level ===
==== Headquarters ====
The AAFC organisation as a whole falls under the command of Headquarters AAFC (HQAAFC). HQAAFC has no physical location as it is made up of members from around the country. The only person to hold the rank of Group Captain (AAFC) (GPCAPT(AAFC)) is the Commander – Australian Air Force Cadets (CDR-AAFC). The CDR-AAFC reports to the Director General Cadets – Air Force, a member of the RAAF who holds the rank of Air Commodore, who reports to the RAAF chain of command.

Under HQAAFC are the Operational Wings and Directorates, each headed by a Wing Commander (WGCDR(AAFC)) who holds the appointment of Officer Commanding or Director respectively.

| Position | Abbreviation | Current Incumbent |
|---|---|---|
| Commander – Australian Air Force Cadets | CDR-AAFC | GPCAPT(AAFC) Kylie Walker |

In 2015 the role of Warrant Officer of the AAFC was abandoned by a majority vote of National and Wing Executive. As a result of this more than 40% of AAFC staff, being Instructors of Cadets, are no longer represented at a national level by a staff member regarded as the most senior AAFC Instructor of Cadets. Airmen within the Wings are represented by the Wing Warrant Officer.

In late 2019 it was reported that the role of Warrant Officer of the AAFC was to be restored. However, as a result of COVID-19 restrictions, this did not occur. In the interim several past Senior officers of cadets re-enlisted and were appointed at ranks that would enable them to qualify to submit an application for the role.

==== Directorates ====
Directorates perform a service support function to Operational Wings. As of Jun 2020, there are 4 Directorates under the announced Headquarters AAFC Functional Groupings.

| Directorate Name | Abbreviation | Director |
|---|---|---|
| Safety | DDSAF | WGCDR(AAFC) Brad Lochrin |
| Cadet and Adult Development | DDCAD | WGCDR(AAFC) Tony Lee |
| People and Culture Directorate | DDPERS | WGCDR(AAFC) Paul Gregory |
| Strategy | DDS&T | WGCDR(AAFC) Dee Dorward |

==== Cadets Branch – Air Force (CB-AF) ====
| Position | Abbreviation | Incumbent |
|---|---|---|
| Director General Cadets – Air Force | DGCADETS-AF | AIRCDRE Anthony Bull |
| Deputy Director General Cadets – Air Force | DDGCADETS-AF | GPCAPT Antony Reid |
| Director Ground Operations | DGNDOPS | GPCAPT Greg Porche |
| Director Aviation Operations | DAVNOPS | GPCAPT Craig White |
| Director Cadet Administration | DCDTADMIN | WGCDR Nigel Leurs |
| Coordination Manager | COORDMGR | APS Rob West |
| Deputy Director General Safety Operations Airworthiness | DDGSOA | N/A |
| National Air Force Liaison Officer | NAFLO | WGCDR Trevor Murphy |
| National Safety Manager | NSM | APS Glenn Roberts |
| Deputy Director Logistics | DDLOG | APS Rob Noonan |

Cadets can join from when they are 12, ensuring they're turning 13 that year and must leave (age out) at the end of the calendar year they turn 18.

=== Operational Wings ===
| Operational Wing | Location |
|---|---|
| No. 1 Wing | Northern Queensland |
| No. 2 Wing | Southern Queensland |
| No. 3 Wing | New South Wales, including the Australian Capital Territory |
| No. 4 Wing | Victoria |
| No. 5 Wing | Tasmania |
| No. 6 Wing | South Australia |
| No. 7 Wing | Western Australia |
| No. 8 Wing | Northern Territory |
| Aviation Operations Wing | National |
*The Aviation Operations Wing was created in late 2018 to unify all the aviation squadrons in each wing.

Each year the Royal Australian Air Force awards the "Australian Air Force Cadets – Air Force Trophy". The winner of the Air Force Trophy is honoured with the custodianship of the AAFC National Banner for the following year.

=== Operational Units ===
Each Wing contains a number of different units (squadrons (SQNs), and flights (FLTs)). Each unit is given a 3-digit number with the first digit representing their parent wing. For example, it can be told just by looking at the squadron number that 101 SQN is part of No. 1 Wing. Squadrons that have completed a freedom of entry parade have been granted permission to state their location when officially referring to their squadron. (E.g. No. 104 (City of Cairns) SQN).

List of Operational Units
| Squadron | Location |
|---|---|
| 101 Squadron | Townsville |
| 103 Squadron | Ingham |
| 104 (City of Cairns) Squadron | Cairns |
| 105 (City of Mackay) Squadron | Mackay |
| 106 Squadron | Tablelands |
| 107 Squadron | Innisfail |
| 108 Squadron | Charters Towers |
| 109 Squadron | Burdekin |
| 110 Squadron | Bowen |
| 111 Squadron | Mount Isa |
| 202 Squadron | Daisy Hill |
| 203 Squadron | East Brisbane |
| 204 Squadron | Roma |
| 205 Squadron | Gatton |
| 207 (City of Nambour) Squadron | Nambour |
| 208 Squadron | Amberly |
| 209 Squadron | Oakey |
| 210 Squadron | Toowoomba |
| 212 (City of Redcliffe) Squadron | Rothwell |
| 213 Squadron | Elanora |
| 214 Squadron | Calamvale |
| 215 Squadron | Carindale |
| 216 Squadron | Maryborough |
| 217 (City of Redland) Squadron | Capalaba |
| 218 Squadron | Corinda |
| 219 Squadron | Archerfield |
| 220 Squadron | Clayfield |
| 221 (City of Gold Coast) Squadron | Ashmore |
| 222 Squadron | Coomera |
| 223 Squadron | Caloundra |
| 224 Squadron | Rothwell |
| 225 Squadron | Ipswich |
| 226 Squadron | Bray Park |
| 227 Squadron | Rockhampton |
| 228 Squadron | Bundaberg |
| 229 Squadron | Yeppoon |
| 230 Squadron | Springfield |
| 232 Squadron | Robina |
| 233 Squadron | Mountain Creek |
| 234 Squadron | Caboolture |
| 302 Squadron | Rockdale |
| 303 (City of Camden) Squadron | Camden |
| 304 Squadron | Pymble |
| 305 (City of Northern Beaches) Squadron | Northern Beaches |
| 306 Squadron | Darlinghurst |
| 307 (City of Bankstown) Squadron | Lidcombe |
| 308 (City of Maitland) Squadron | Maitland |
| 309 Squadron | Holsworthy |
| 310 (City of Tamworth) Squadron | Tamworth |
| 311 (City of Gosford) Squadron | Gosford |
| 312 Squadron | South Kempsey |
| 313 (City of Dubbo) Squadron | Dubbo |
| 314 (City of Wollongong) Squadron | Wollongong |
| 315 (City of Canberra) Squadron | Canberra |
| 316 (City of Lake Macquarie) Squadron | Lake Macquarie |
| 317 (City of Taree) Squadron | Taree |
| 318 (Shire of Sutherland) Squadron | Sutherland |
| 319 Squadron | Inverell |
| 321 (City of Newcastle) Squadron | Newcastle |
| 322 (City of Ryde) Squadron | Ryde |
| 323 (City of Blue Mountains) Squadron | Glenbrook |
| 324 (City of Randwick) Squadron | Randwick |
| 325 (City of Goulburn) Squadron | Goulburn |
| 326 (City of Lismore) Squadron | Lismore |
| 327 Squadron | Gungahlin |
| 328 (City of Bathurst) Squadron | Bathurst |
| 329 (City of Orange) Squadron | Orange |
| 330 (City of Shoalhaven) Squadron | Shoalhaven |
| 331 Squadron | Coffs Harbour |
| 332 (City of Wagga Wagga) Squadron | Wagga Wagga |
| 333 Squadron | Port Macquarie |
| 334 Squadron | Harman |
| 335 Squadron | Williamtown |
| 336 Squadron | Richmond |
| 337 Squadron | Armidale |
| 338 (City of Shellharbour) Squadron | Shellharbour |
| 339 Squadron | Moree |
| 340 (City of Griffith) Squadron | Griffith |
| 345 Squadron | Orchard Hills |
| 346 Squadron | Canberra |
| 401 Squadron | Surrey Hills |
| 402 Squadron | Watsonia |
| 403 Squadron | Beaconsfield |
| 404 Squadron | Point Cook |
| 405 Squadron | Sunshine |
| 406 Squadron | Frankston South |
| 408 Squadron | Ringwood East |
| 409 (City of Sale) Squadron | Sale |
| 410 Squadron | Bendigo |
| 411 Squadron | Swan Hill |
| 412 Squadron | Albury-Wodonga |
| 413 Squadron | Warrnambool |
| 414 Squadron | Richmond |
| 415 Squadron | South Yarra |
| 416 Squadron | Moonee Ponds |
| 417 (City of Bayside) Squadron | Sandringham |
| 418 Squadron | Point Cook |
| 419 Squadron | Shepparton |
| 420 Squadron | Wangaratta |
| 424 Squadron | Morwell |
| 425 (City of Ballarat) Squadron | Ballarat |
| 426 (City of Latrobe) Squadron | Traralgon |
| 427 (City of Greater Geelong) Squadron | Greater Geelong |
| 428 Squadron | Geelong |
| 429 Squadron | Queenscliff |
| 430 Squadron | Macedon Ranges |
| 501 Squadron | Dowsings Point |
| 502 Squadron | Hobart |
| 507 Squadron | Devonport |
| 508 (City of Launceston) Squadron | Launceston |
| 601 Squadron | Keswick |
| 602 Squadron | Woodside |
| 603 Squadron | Berri |
| 604 Squadron | Greenacres |
| 605 Squadron | Lonsdale |
| 608 (Town of Gawler) Squadron | Gawler |
| 609 Squadron | Warradale |
| 612 Squadron | Mount Gambier |
| 613 Squadron | Edinburgh |
| 614 (City of Port Pirie) Squadron | Port Pirie |
| 617 Squadron | Keswick |
| 620 Squadron | Port Adelaide-Enfield |
| 622 Squadron | Murray Bridge |
| 623 (City of Mildura) Squadron | Mildura |
| 701 Squadron | Bullsbrook |
| 702 Squadron | Cannington |
| 703 (City of Fremantle) Squadron | Fremantle |
| 704 (City of Wanneroo) Squadron | Madeley |
| 705 (City of Albany) Squadron | Albany |
| 707 Squadron | Mandurah |
| 708 Squadron | Rockingham |
| 709 (City of Kalgoorlie-Boulder) Squadron | Kalgoorie-Boulder |
| 710 Squadron | Bunbury |
| 711 (City of Greater Geraldton) Squadron | Greater Geraldton |
| 712 (City of Belmont) Squadron | Belmont |
| 713 Squadron | Cannington |
| 714 Squadron | Karrakatta |
| 715 (City of Belmont) Squadron | Belmont |
| 721 Squadron | Madeley |
| 723 Squadron | Joondalup |
| 801 Squadron | Darwin |
| 802 Squadron | Palmerston |
| 803 Squadron | Katherine |
| 804 Squadron | Alice Springs |

==== Special Units ====
In each wing, there are also special units that perform specialised duties such as aviation training, logistics, firearms training, and music.

List of Special Units
| Parent Wing | Squadron/Flight | Type |
|---|---|---|
| No. 1 Wing | 100 Squadron | Aviation Training |
| No. 1 Wing | 102 Flight | Firearms Training |
| No. 1 Wing | 1LOG Flight | Logistics Flight |
| No. 2 Wing | 200 Squadron | |
| No. 3 Wing | 300 Squadron | Specialist Training |
| No. 3 Wing | 341 Flight | Aeromodelling Flight |
| No. 3 Wing | 342 Flight | Fieldcraft & Adventure Training Flight |
| No. 3 Wing | 343 Flight | Firearms Flight |
| No. 3 Wing | 344 Flight | Musicians Flight |
| No. 4 Wing | 400 Squadron | Specialist Training |
| No. 4 Wing | 431 Flight | Fieldcraft Specialist Flight |
| No. 4 Wing | 432 Flight | Band Flight |
| No. 4 Wing | 4LOG Flight | Logistics Flight |
| No. 5 Wing | 500 Squadron | Support Squadron |
| No. 5 Wing | 5LOG Flight | Logistics Flight |
| No. 6 Wing | 600 Squadron | Aviation Training |
| No. 6 Wing | 606 Flight | Band Flight |
| No. 6 Wing | 616 Flight | Specialist Flight |
| No. 6 Wing | 6LOG Flight | Logistics Flight |
| No. 7 Wing | 716 Flight | Aviation Training |
| No. 7 Wing | 717 Flight | Firearms Training |
| No. 7 Wing | 718 Flight | Ceremonial |
| No. 7 Wing | 719 Flight | Field Training |
| No. 7 Wing | 720 Flight | Heritage & Aeromodelling |
| No. 7 Wing | 7LOG Flight | Logistics Flight |
| No. 8 Wing | 800 Squadron | Support Squadron |
| No. 8 Wing | 8LOG Flight | Logistics Flight |

The Aviation Operations Wing (sometimes unofficially referred to as "9 Wing") is a wing for aviation operations. Its flights fall under two categories: Gliding Training School (GTS) for gliding experiences and Elementary Flying Training School (EFTS) for powered flights. They are as follows:

List of Units in the Aviation Operations Wing
| Type | Flight | Location |
|---|---|---|
| Gliding Training School | GTS Flight Balaklava | Balaklava |
| Gliding Training School | GTS Flight Warwick | Warwick |
| Gliding Training School | GTS Flight Bathurst | Bathurst |
| Elementary Flying Training School | EFTS Flight Point Cook | Point Cook |
| Elementary Flying Training School | EFTS Flight Richmond | Richmond |
| Elementary Flying Training School | EFTS Flight Amberley | Amberly |

== Command and structure ==
The AAFC organisation as a whole falls under the command of Headquarters AAFC (HQAAFC). HQAAFC has no physical location as it is made up of members from around the country. The only person to hold the rank of Group Captain (AAFC) is the Commander of the Australian Air Force Cadets (CDR-AAFC). The CDR-AAFC reports to the Director General Cadets – Air Force, a member of the RAAF who holds the rank of Air Commodore, and in turn reports to the RAAF chain of command.

Under HQAAFC are the Operational Wings and Directorates, each headed by a WGCDR(AAFC) who holds the appointment of Officer Commanding (OC) or Director respectively. Cadet squadrons only exist within the Operational Wings. They report to the Operational Wing Officer Commanding (often through an Executive Officer) and are commanded by a Commanding Officer. A squadron Commanding Officer (CO) will hold the rank of PLTOFF(AAFC), FLGOFF(AAFC) or FLTLT(AAFC) unless the officer holds another appointment which entitles them to a more senior rank, some squadrons are commanded by a WOFF(AAFC).

There are 8 Operational Wings for all states and territories, however, the state of Queensland is divided into two Wings. There are also eight directorates to serve a support function for operational wings: Aviation Operations Directorate (AOD), Corporate Services Directorate (CSD), Diversity Directorate (DIVD), People and Culture Directorate (PCD), Operations Directorate (OPSD), Safety Directorate (SAFD), Training Directorate (TD).

As of 1 April 2005, a squadron's establishment no longer justifies a CO to hold the rank of SQNLDR(AAFC) rank. However, it is still possible to have a CO of SQNLDR(AAFC) or even WGCDR(AAFC) rank, but only if that CO holds a wing or national position e.g. Officer Commanding, Director, Staff Officer or deputy director position in Wing or National HQ in addition to their appointment as a squadron CO.

There are a number of key appointments within Wing Headquarters, including;

| Appointment | Abbreviation | Rank |
|---|---|---|
| Officer Commanding | OC | WGCDR(AAFC) |
| Executive Officer* | XO | SQNLDR(AAFC) |
*Some wings have a regional appointment with the region appended to the title. e.g. Executive Officer (South) (RXO-S).
| Staff Officer Training* | SOT | SQNLDR(AAFC) |
*Some wings have specific appointments with the speciality appended to the title. e.g. Staff Officer Ground Training (Squadron) (SOGT(SQN)).
| Staff Officer Management Services | SOMS | SQNLDR(AAFC) |
| Staff Officer Operations | SOOPS | SQNLDR(AAFC) |
| Staff Officer Wing Safety | SOWS | SQNLDR(AAFC) |
| Wing Warrant Officer | WGWOFF | WOFF(AAFC) |
*Some wings have a regional appointment with the region appended to the title. e.g. Wing Warrant Officer (South) (WGWOFF(S)).
| Regional Executive Instructor* | RXI | SGT(AAFC) – FSGT(AAFC) |
*Some wings have regional appointments with the region appended to the title e.g. Regional Executive Instructor (West) (RXIW).
| Chairman Wing Cadet Reference Group | CWCRG | CSGT – CUO |

There are also a large number of other positions such as Administration Officer, Psychologist, Chaplain and various other training and administrative appointments. Larger Wings may have more executive and other appointments.

Each Wing has an Air Force Liaison Officer (AFLO), a RAAF officer (often a reservist) who is responsible for all activities requiring RAAF support for that region, amongst other duties.

Aviators and junior officers are posted to an individual squadron (as per a squadron's size) as instructors of cadets (IOC) and officers of cadets (OOC).

The AAFC incorporates a National Cadet Reference Group, comprising eight Wing Chairs under the direction and leadership of a Chairman of the NCRG and Deputy Chairman of the NCRG. This is the peak representative and advisory body acting on behalf of the cadets to the higher echelons of the organisation. The chairman is a default member of several groups through virtue of their appointment including the tri-service Cadet Consultative Forum, the AAFC Executive Council and the National Council among others.

== Activities ==
Cadets receive the opportunity to participate in a wide range of activities such as:

- Home Training
- Bivouacs (Bush Camps)
- Live Firearm Shooting
- WTSS training shoots
- Gliding and Powered Air Experience and Training
- General Service Training Camps
- Personal Development and Leadership Courses (PDLC)
- Parades and Marches – Drill and Ceremonial
- Unmanned Aerial Vehicles
- Rocketry
- Aeromodelling
- Concert and Marching Bands
- National Competitions
- International Air Cadet Exchange
- Ed Glazing Promo Course

=== National Competitions ===
HQAAFC holds three National Competitions throughout the year, they are:

- National Fieldcraft Competition (NFCC) – Held annually at various locations (such as Puckapunyal Training Area in Victoria (Australia), or Majura Training Area in the Australian Capital Territory).
- National Rifle Competition (NRC) – Held in September each year at various locations (such as Sydney International Shooting Centre).
- National Aviation Competition (NAC) – (formerly known as NATFLY) Held in December (previously October) of each year on RAAF Bases around the country, both Power and Gliding competitions take place.

In 2023, 2024 and 2025, the AAFC participated in the Chief of Army Cadets Team Challenge, an Australian Army Cadets national competition hosted at Kokoda Barracks, Canungra.

=== Wing Competitions ===
Wings may also hold their own competitions throughout the year and are similar to national competitions. This can include Drill Competitions, Unmanned Aerial Vehicle (UAV) competitions and a shooting competitions.

=== International Air Cadet Exchange (IACE) ===
The International Air Cadet Exchange (IACE) Program came into being in 1947 when Canada and the UK arranged a bi-lateral exchange of air cadets between the two countries.

The AAFC currently exchanges with the following countries:

- United States
- Canada
- United Kingdom
- Hong Kong
- Singapore
- New Zealand
- France
- Republic of Korea (second year)
- Netherlands

=== Minor Activities ===
==== Airshows ====
Cadets are given the opportunity to appear at local airshows and military expos depending on location of the unit. For Example, 6 Wing (South Australia) sent many cadets to attend the Edinburgh Air Show.

==== Charities ====
Cadets assist local communities by holding and assisting in charity events, one such event including Relay for Life. These also consist of donations to military support organisations such as Legacy. Sometimes Senior Cadets plan these events.

==== Bivouacs ====
AAFC units commonly partake in camping activities called 'bivouacs' and allow cadets to learn fieldcraft, leadership and teamwork prior to a promotional course. These can last from a weekend to a week.

== Memorials ==
Australia has two memorials to the Australian Air Force Cadets. The first occupies a prominent position on the grounds of St John's Ashfield, and a memorial service attended by the Cadets has been held annually since it was opened by the State Governor Lieutenant General John Northcott in 1946. It was built by Squadron Leader Arthur Whitehurst who had commanded a squadron at Ashfield during the period 1941–1946, and whose son Douglas Arthur Whitehurst had died in action in World War II.

The second is a plaque unveiled in 1981 as part of a commemoration parade on the fortieth anniversary of the Australian Air Force Cadets' predecessor the Air Training Corps. The plaque is located at the base of a tree adjacent to the south west path leading from the Shrine of Remembrance in Melbourne, Victoria.

Many squadrons have an association with a local Returned and Services League (RSL) branch and participate in local ceremonies such as ANZAC Day and Remembrance Day marches with their local RSL Branch.

== Firearms ==
=== Currently in use ===
- Cz452
- Cz453
- Cz455
- ZKM 452
- F88 (Only used in ceremonial activities and in the F88 elective)

=== Formerly used ===
- Lee Enfield (retired 2011) (Still used during military drill)
- Martini Cadet (retired in the 1970s)
- L1a1 (retired 2013) (Still used during drill)

== Aircraft and Gliders ==
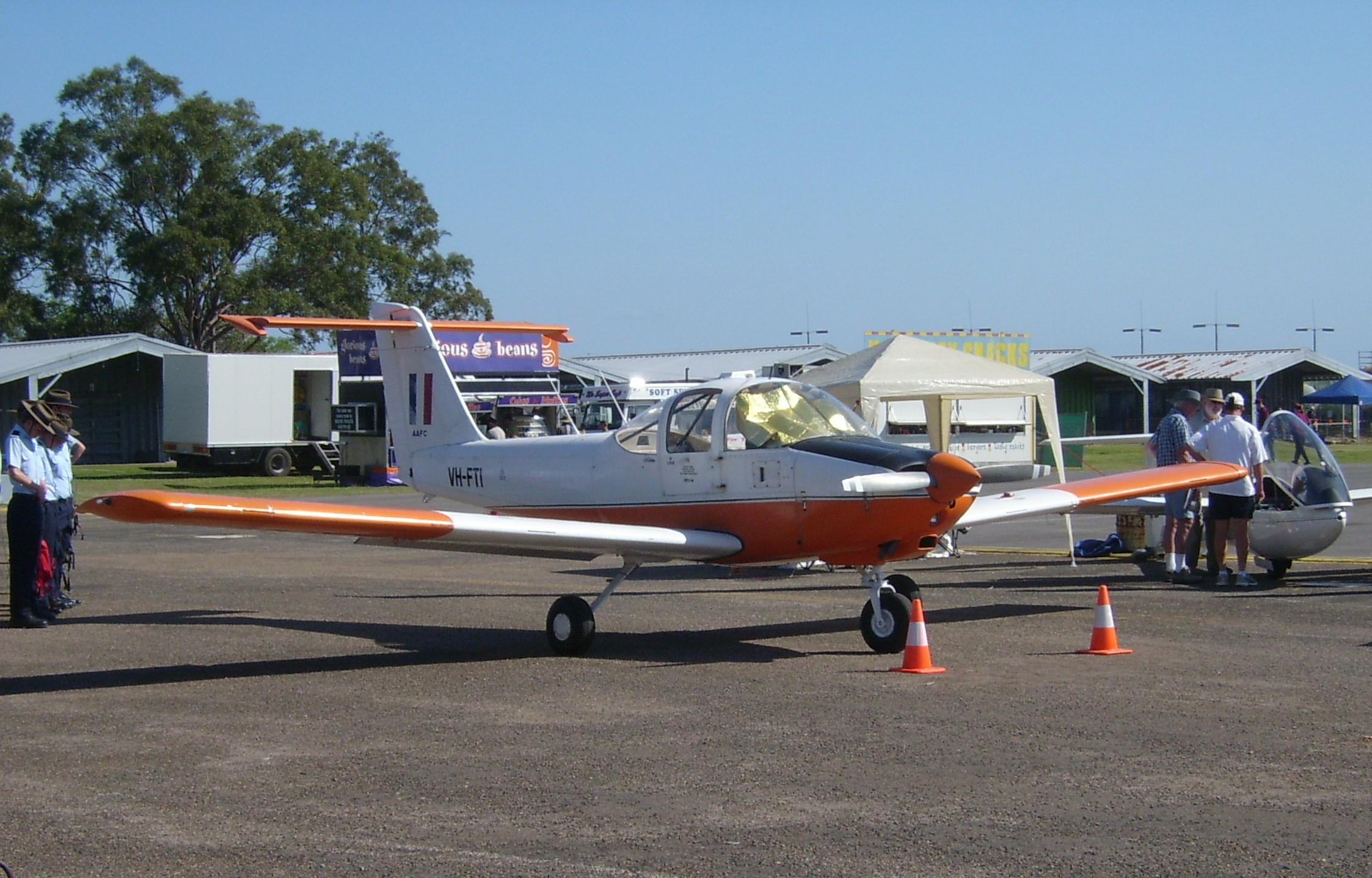
Piper PA-38 Tomahawk in Australian Air Force Cadet livery

=== Powered Fixed Wing Aircraft ===
| Aircraft | Variants | Origin | Role | Period of service |
|---|---|---|---|---|
| Diamond DA40 Diamond Star | DA-40NG | Austria | Four-seat light aircraft | 2019–present |
| Piper PA-25 Pawnee | PA-25-235, PA-25-235A1 | United States | Single-seat glider tug aircraft | 2007–2017 |

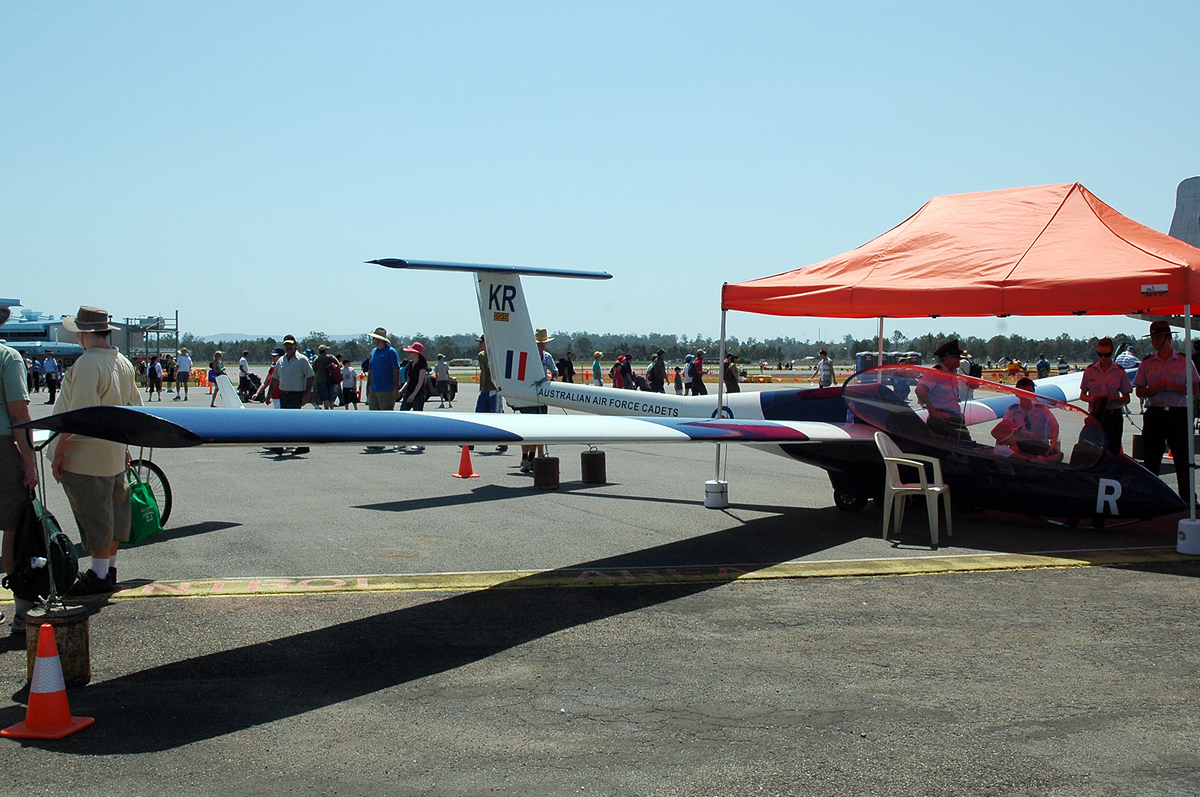
A PZL Krosno KR-03A Puchatek in Australian Air Force Cadets livery

=== Past Powered Fixed-Wing Aircraft ===
| Aircraft | Variants | Origin | Role | Period of service |
|---|---|---|---|---|
| Cessna 172 Skyhawk | 172D Skyhawk | United States | Four-seat light utility aircraft | 1981–? |
| Zlín Z 42 | 242L | Czechoslovakia | Two-seat pilot trainer aircraft | 2002–2018 |
| Beechcraft Baron | 58 Baron | United States | Ground-based instructional airframe and simulator | 2003–? |
| Grob G 109 | G 109 | Germany | Two-seat motor-glider aircraft | 2006–? |
| Piper PA-38 Tomahawk | PA-38-112 | United States | Two-seat pilot trainer, utility aircraft | 2006–? |
| Scheibe Falke | SF-25C Falke | Germany | Two-seat motor-glider aircraft | 2006–? |

=== Gliders ===
| Aircraft | Variants | Origin | Period of service |
|---|---|---|---|
| DG Flugzeugbau DG-1000 | DG-1000S | Germany | 2013–present |

The AAFC Have sold most of its DG-1000 Only 10 remains

=== Past Gliders ===
| Aircraft | Variants | Origin | Period of service |
|---|---|---|---|
| Grob G 103 Twin Astir | G.103 | Germany | 2018– |
| Grob G103a Twin II | G.103a Twin II | Germany | 2010–2018 |
| LET L-13 Blanik | L-13, L-13A1 | Czechoslovakia | 2010–2018 |
| PZL Krosno KR-03 Puchatek | KR-03A | Poland | 2006–2018 |
| Schleicher ASK 13 | ASK-13 | Germany | 2006–2018 |
| Schleicher ASK-21 | ASK-21, ASK-21Mi | Germany | 2014–2018 |
| Schleicher K7 | K.7 | Germany | |
| Schleicher Ka 6 | Ka.6CR | Germany | 2010–2018 |
| SZD-51 Junior | 51-1 Junior | Poland | |

== Incidents ==
=== Suicide of Ellie Tibble ===
In November 2000, 15 year old Cadet Sergeant Ellie Tibble committed suicide after being forced to either resign or be dishonourably discharged from the AAFC on fraternisation charges with an instructor. A later internal Defence investigation found the disciplinary action inappropriate and unreasonable. It was later revealed that the Deputy Director Reserve Personnel Cadets gave a direction to Officer Commanding 5 Wing (Tasmania) to retain her in the AAFC, two weeks before the suicide, as the discharge proposal was unfounded, but the direction was never carried out. Her death has since been the basis for the Ellie Tibble Award, given to high-performing cadets.

=== Royal Commission ===
In 2017, a Royal Commission into Institutional Responses to Child Sexual Abuse was held, examining the experiences of men and women who experienced sexual abuse in multiple institutions, including HMAS Leeuwin and the Army Apprentice School Balcombe between 1960 - 1980, and in ADF Cadets since 2000. The Royal Commission found "...the AAFC was more concerned with the 'efficiency' of the flight unit and setting an example to other cadets than with the protection of cadets from adult instructors in positions of authority" in regard to dealing with the charges against Tibble.

== See also ==
- Australian Defence Force Cadets
  - Australian Army Cadets
  - Australian Navy Cadets
- Australian Air League
- Air Training Corps (United Kingdom)
- Civil Air Patrol (United States)
- New Zealand Air Training Corps
- Royal Canadian Air Cadets
