= Dakar 4x4 =

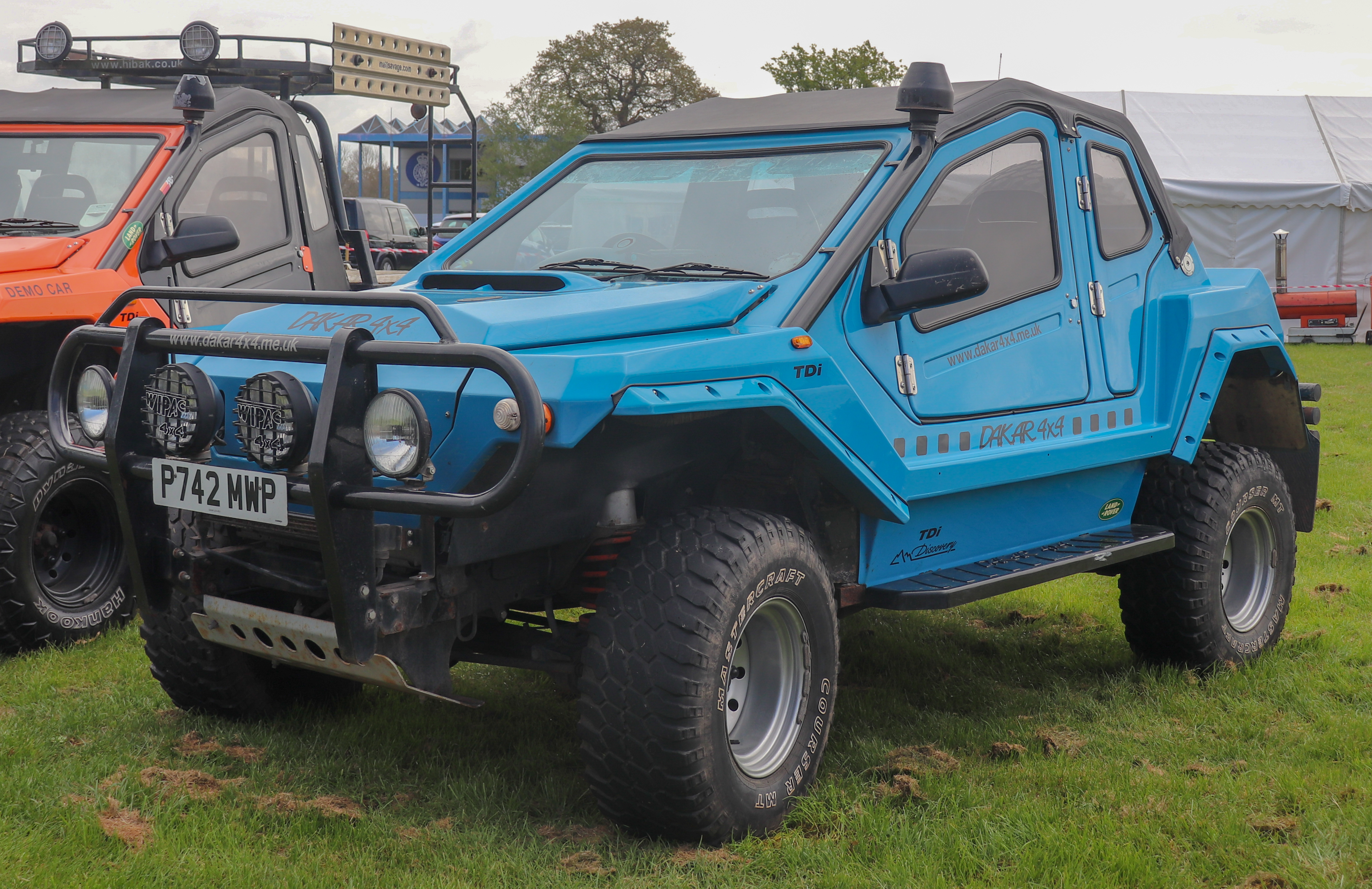

Overview
- Type: Kit car
- Manufacturer: Dakar 4x4
- Production: 1991
- Assembly: Melton Mowbray, Leicestershire.

Body and chassis
- Body style: Off-Road Vehicle
- Chassis: Body-on-frame
- Related: Range Rover

Powertrain
- Engine: Rover V8 350 Chevrolet
- Hybrid drivetrain: 4x4

Dimensions
- Wheelbase: 2540 mm
- Length: 3710 mm
- Width: 1810 mm
- Height: 1910 mm
- Curb weight: 1,510 kg

Chronology
- Predecessor: The Adams Rotrax

The Dakar 4x4 is an off-road kit car originally designed for the Paris to Dakar rally.

== Development ==
The Dakar was developed in 1991 by Barry Chantler of Dakar Cars in Dartford, Kent. A successor to the Rotrax, the Dakar uses a Range Rover chassis rather than the more conventional sports car style. The Rotrax was a RWD 2-seater buggy built on a space frame chassis using Cortina suspension and engines. Dennis Adams, its designer, tagged it "the thinking man's beach buggy". The original Sport 2-seater was later joined by the 2+2 Safari model.

The Dakar matched the Range Rover's 100-inch wheelbase and added a rear seat, as well as carrying over the V8 engine and 4WD from the donor vehicle. As well as the performance improvements from the reduced bodyweight, the Dakar design greatly improved the approach and departure angles of a standard vehicle.

The kit car has slowly evolved, including the ability to now be fitted to a Discovery chassis. Enthusiasts have fitted a number of engine upgrades, from a 5.7L small block Chevrolet engine, up to a 7.3L with nitrous oxide injection.

Dakars are now manufactured and built to order by Steve Bennett's company Dakar 4×4 in Melton Mowbray, Leicestershire. There are around 120 known conversions in the UK, with more in the Netherlands.

== Bespoke models ==
The Dakar found TV fame in the 1990s, with a factory-built car being chosen for the series Challenge Anneka, replacing the previously used VW-based beach buggy. The vehicle was finished in the series' trademark colours of a light blue body with yellow roll cage and weather gear. The Dakar reprised its role on a special 25th anniversary edition of the show.

Barry Chantler also designed a small-scale Dakar for children, the design of which reached the prototyping/bodyshell stage.

Australian company John E Davis Motor Works made a car called the Bush Ranger ("Bushie") that derived from the Dakar.

== See also ==
- Land Rover
