= Norinco JW-103 =

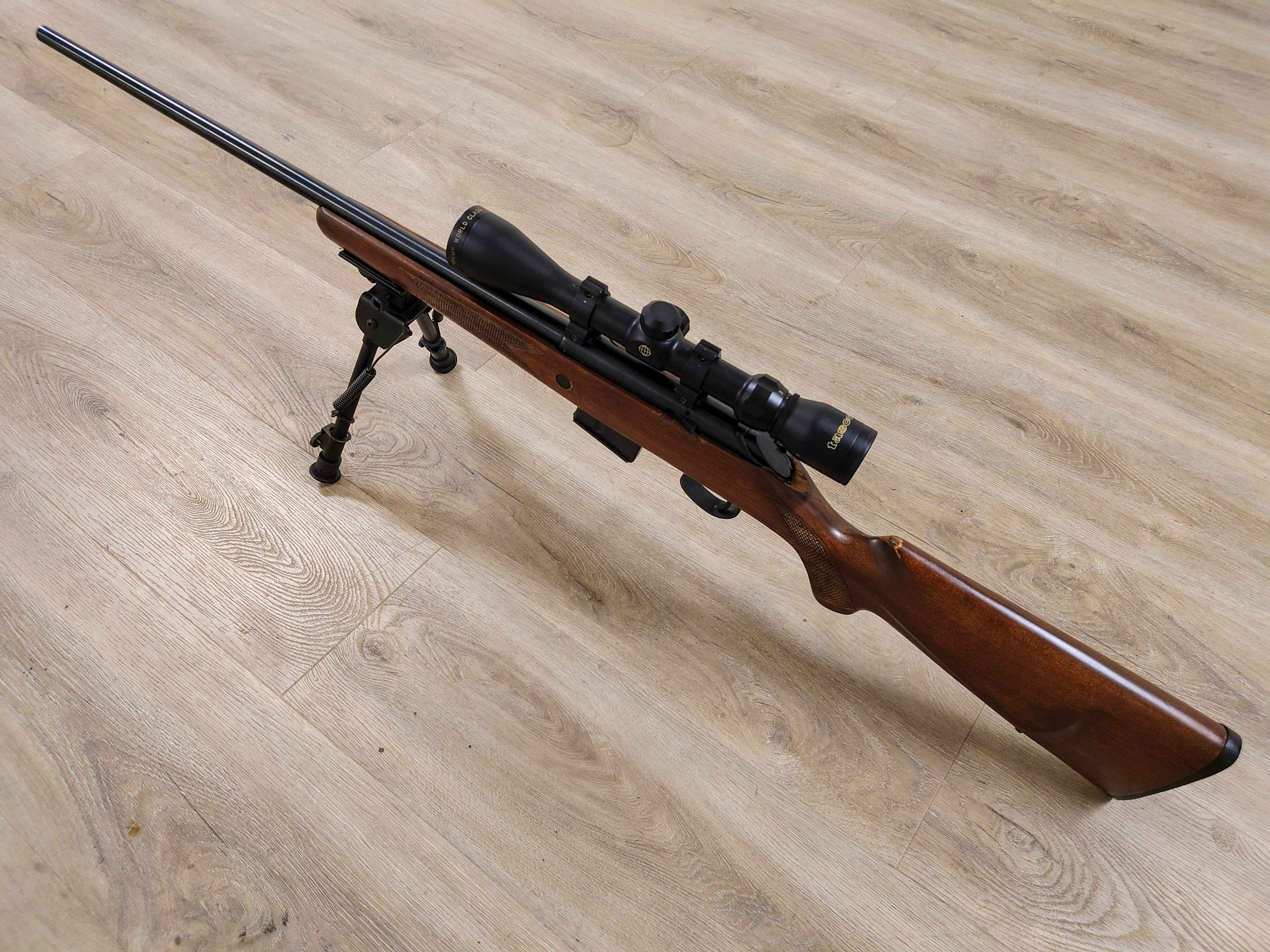
- Norinco JW-103 fitted wtth a scope and bipods
- Type: bolt-action rifle
- Place of origin: China

Production history
- Designer: China North Industries Corporation
- Designed: 1993-1995
- Manufacturer: Zhongzhou Machine Works
- Produced: 1995 - Present
- No. built: 8000+ JW-103; 1000+ JW-105
- Variants: Norinco JW-105

Specifications
- Mass: 2.8 kg (6.17 lb) (JW-103); 3 kg (6.61 lb) (JW-105)
- Length: 1,040 mm (40.9 in) (JW-103); 1,045 mm (41.1 in) (JW-105)
- Barrel length: 534 mm (21.0 in) (JW-103); 535 mm (21.1 in) (JW-105)
- Cartridge: 7.62×39mm (JW-103).223 Remington (JW-105)
- Action: bolt action
- Muzzle velocity: 655m/s (JW-103); 975m/s (JW-105)
- Effective firing range: 100m
- Feed system: 5 round box magazine
- Sights: None (JW-103); Iron sights (JW-105)

The Norinco JW-103 'Bush Ranger' is a centrefire bolt-action hunting rifle developed and exported by China North Industries Corporation of the People's Republic of China. The rifles are manufactured at Norinco's subsidiary, Zhongzhou Machine Works, formerly known as the State Factory No. 396.

== Overview ==
The Norinco JW-103 is part of Norinco's 'Jian Wei' (Chinese: 健卫; pinyin: Jiàn Wèi; lit. 'Health(y) Guard') series of sporting rifles which began in 1955. The JW-103s development began in 1993 to create a rifle for the lucrative foreign hunting market. The design for this new rifle was finalized in June 1995 with mass production put underway by the end of the same year. The rifle's design is based around the Norinco JW-9/15 series of rifles, a simplified Chinese copy of the Czech .22 LR Brno Model 2 (later CZ 452) rifle.

The receiver is made from both milled and forged steel while the barrel has a heavy blued finish. The rifle uses Russian designed 7.62×39mm cartridges which are fed from a detachable, single column 5 round box magazine, and is drilled and tapped for weaver scope ring bases, which can be used to mount various types of scopes. Compared to the JW-15, the JW-103 adds a three-way, user-adjustable trigger, a feature generally exclusive to higher end rifles. The trigger force, take-up, and break (sear contact patch area) are all adjustable via two threaded nuts and a set screw. The JW-103 has no sights while the JW-105 has front and rear sights. The rear sight is mounted on the barrel. The Norinco JW-103 and JW-105 are commercially available in many countries such as Australia, Canada, France, Germany and New Zealand, sometimes branded as "Bisley Small Arms" instead of Norinco.

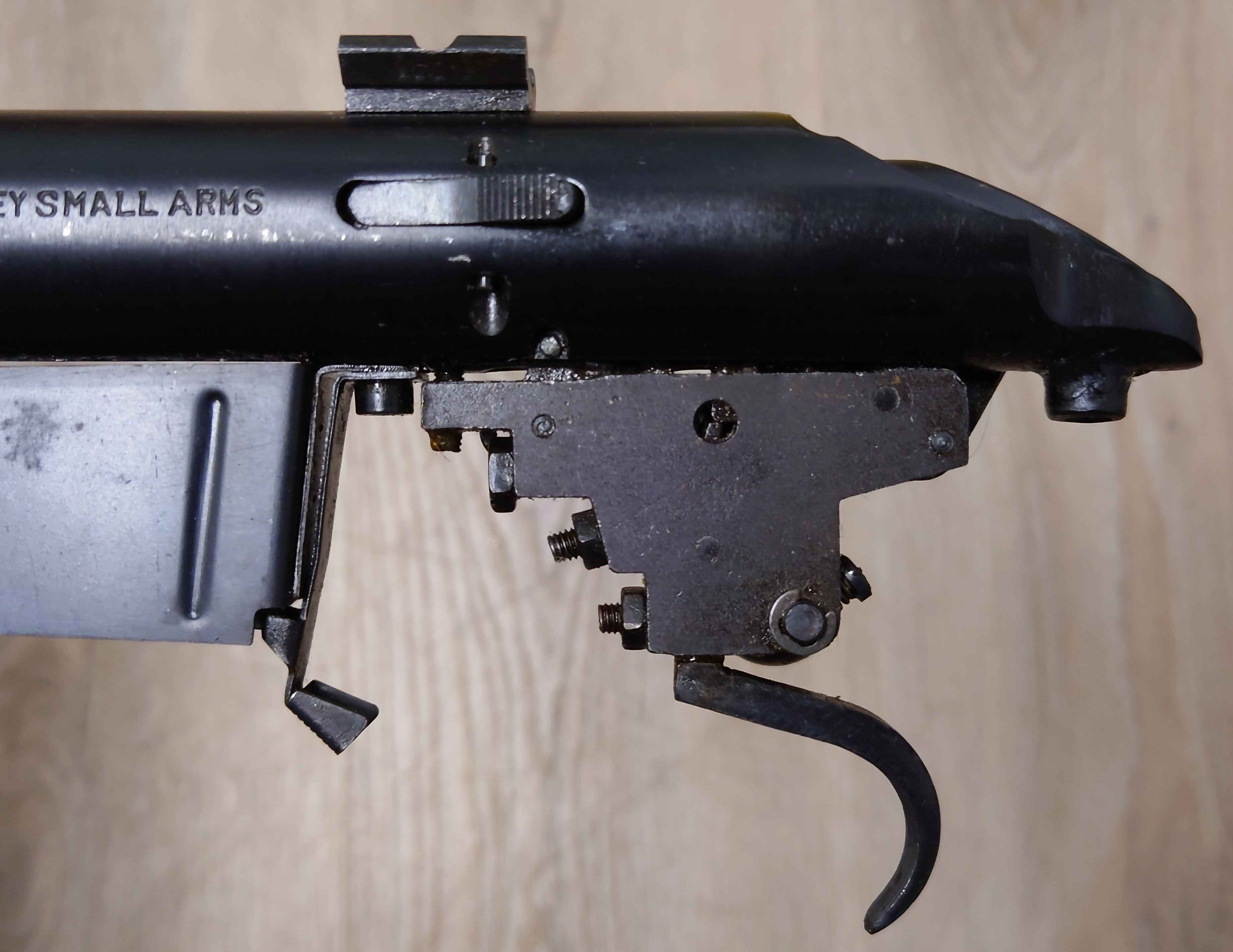
JW-103's 3-way adjustable trigger group

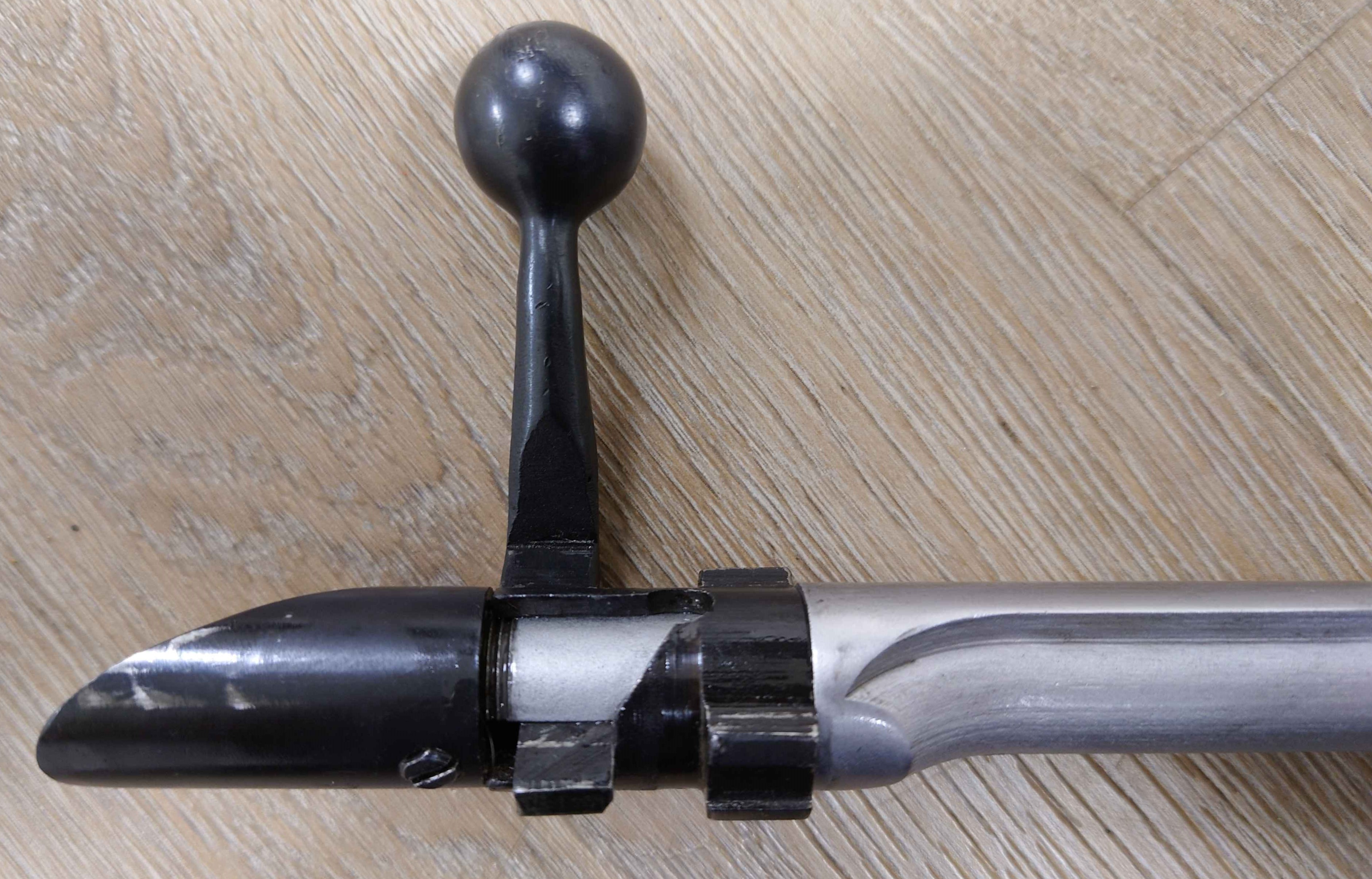
Closeup of the JW-103's bolt, note the two cam lugs connected to the bolt handle

Contrary to common beliefs, the JW-103/105 did not employ a Mauser-style front-locking action found on the earlier JW-101 rifle. The bolt design was scaled up from the rimfire JW-15, while adding a pair of rear-locking lugs connected to the bolt handle.

== Variants ==
The sole variant of the JW-103 is the Norinco JW-105 which is chambered for the .223 Remington cartridge, also named the 'Bush Ranger'. The JW-105 rifle is slightly longer and heavier than the JW-103. The JW-105 features open-style iron sights but is otherwise identical to the JW-103. The JW-105 began development in 1999 with the target of expanding into the overseas hunting market by designing a rifle that would better appeal to shooters who may prefer the more common .223 Remington over the 7.62×39mm round. The JW-105's design was approved in March 2001 and with mass production starting immediately afterwards. The JW-103 and 105 are often advertised as lightweight, reliable hunting rifles available at a lower price than that of similar rifles. The JW-103/105 series is unrelated to the Norinco JW-101 rifle, which was a copy of the Zastava M48 bolt-action rifle also chambered in 7.62x39mm with a 4-round fixed magazine and a Kar98k-style furniture, which never entered mass production.

== See also ==
- Norinco
- CZ 452
- CZ 550
