= The Bushranger =

The Bushranger may refer to:

- The Bushranger (1928 film)
- The Bushranger (1976 film)
- The Bushrangers, a play staged in Australia

== See also ==
- Bushranger (disambiguation)
