= Bush Ranger (car) =

Australian-made 4WD buggy

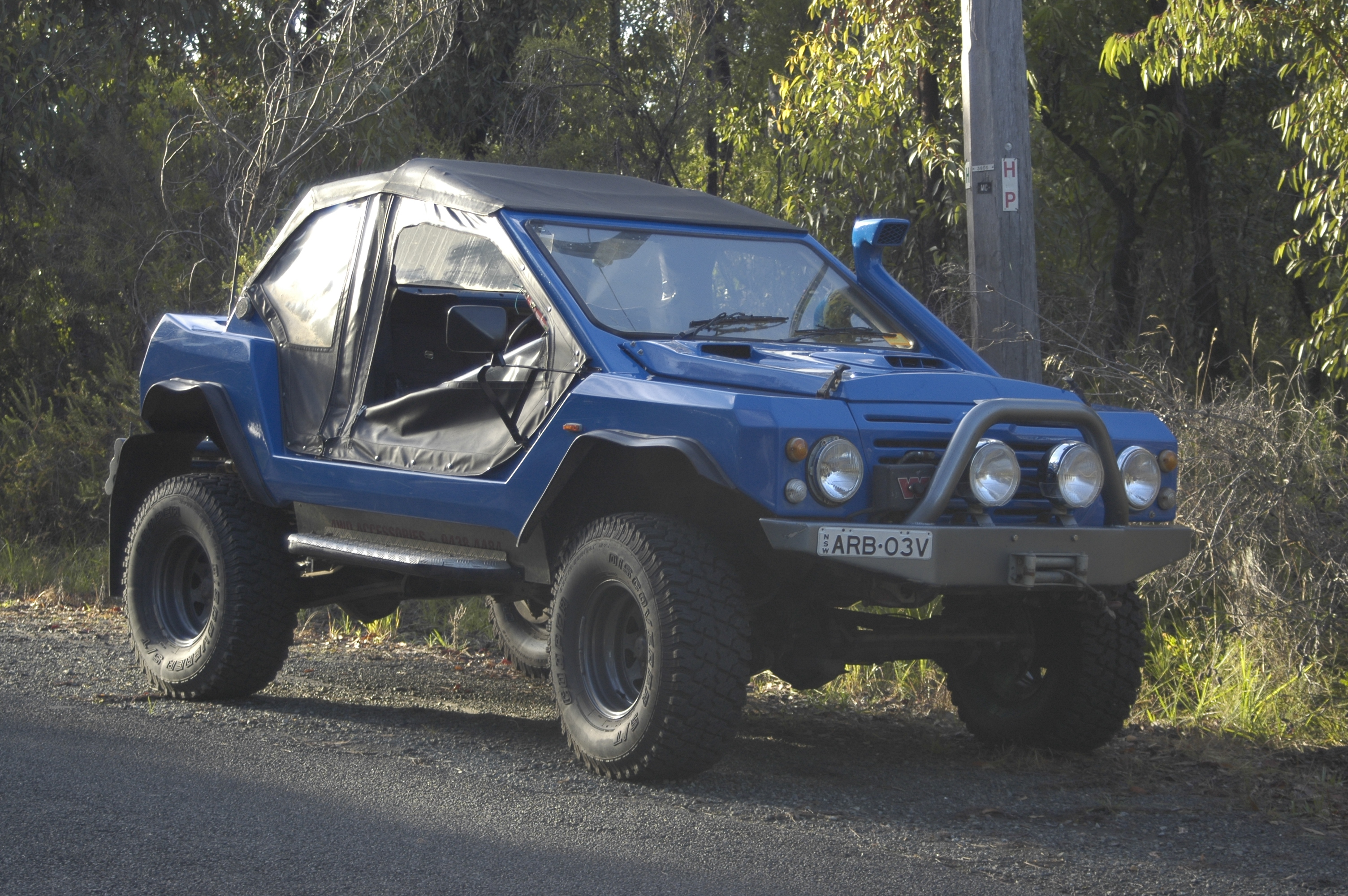
Photograph of the Australian made "Bush Ranger", February 2006

The Bush Ranger (also known as Bush Rangie) is an Australian permanent 4WD buggy that was redesigned and manufactured by John E Davis Motor Works and derived from the United Kingdom Dakar but is considerably different, although both use Range Rover or Land Rover Discovery parts. Options like roofs, front and rear butterfly doors and canvas doors and roofs are available. Red Bull has a Bush Ranger as a promotional vehicle.

Like the Dakar, the Bush Ranger is typically a scrapped Range Rover or Discovery; the chassis of which has been cut off behind the rear axle, a roll cage added and a fibreglass shell body placed over the top. The interior is usually that of a Range Rover, or a Land Rover Discovery, and the engine and gearbox is also Range Rover or Land Rover. Other engines have been used.

During 2014 Ownership of Bush Ranger passed to a partnership of John Hill and David Marshall with the operation moving to Queensland under the new company name of Bush Ranger ATV, and development started to enable Bush Ranger shells to be fitted to the Nissan Patrol and Toyota Hilux chassis. The business closed at the start of 2016.

== Bush Rangers in kit-form ==
In kit form, the builder buys the shell and roll cage from the manufacturer and must purchase a donor vehicle (usually from wrecking or scrapping motor vehicle yards). The donor vehicle is pulled down to a rolling chassis, and then the process of putting the kit together starts.

== See also ==
- Truggy
