= CZ 455 =

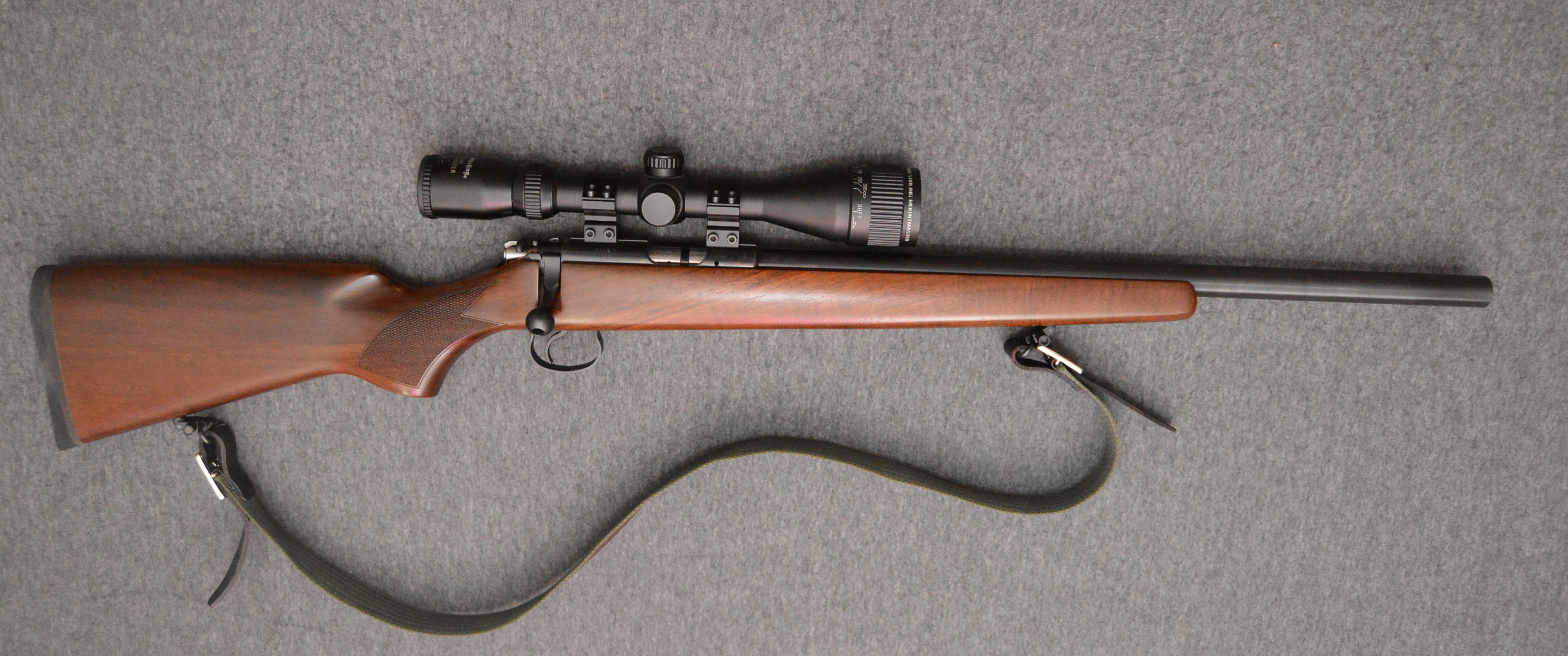
- Type: Hunting/Target rifle
- Place of origin: Czech Republic

Production history
- Designed: 2007-2008
- Manufacturer: Česká Zbrojovka Uherský Brod
- Produced: 2010-2018
- Variants: American, Varmint, Lux, Scout, Silhouette, Style, FS

Specifications
- Length: varies with barrel length
- Barrel length: 16 in (410 mm) to 28.6 in (730 mm) dependent on model
- Cartridge: .22 Long Rifle, .22 WMR, .17 HMR, .17 HM2
- Action: Bolt-action
- Maximum firing range: 200 meters
- Feed system: 5 rounds (standard); 10- and 25-round magazines and single-shot magazine adapters optional
- Sights: open (some models); 11 mm dovetail rail for optical sights

The CZ 455 is a series of magazine-fed bolt-action rimfire repeating rifle manufactured by the Czech firearms manufacturer Česká Zbrojovka Uherský Brod (abbreviated "CZ-UB", English: Czech Weapons Factory — Uherský Brod) and imported into the United States by CZ-USA. It is a successor of the highly popular CZ 452 rifles, and is chambered for the .22 LR (1:16" twist rate), .22 WMR (1:16" twist) and .17 HMR (1:9" twist) calibers. Most versions of the 455 rifle series were discontinued in 2018 and replaced by the CZ 457.

The CZ 455 is produced with new manufacturing technology capable of closer tolerances for improved accuracy and smoother operation. All CZ 455s have hammer-forged, hand-lapped steel barrels, a trigger that is adjustable for weight of pull, and the capability to interchange barrels in different contours and calibers by simply removing two set screws from the receiver.

== Design and operation ==
Instead of the barrel being threaded into the receiver, as found on the CZ 452, all CZ 455 models use twin set-screws to fix the barrel in the frame as part of an interchangeable barrel system. Additionally, actions can be swapped into any 455 stock without modifications. All versions feature a milled 11 mm dovetail rail atop the receiver for the mounting of optical or telescopic sights.

== History ==
First introduced in 2010, the CZ 455 was designed to replace the CZ 452 series which is being phased out of current production. The CZ 452 first appeared in 1954 as the Model 2 (ZKM 452), and was a refinement of the CZ Model 1 (ZKM-451) .22-calibre rimfire bolt-action training rifle that first appeared in 1947. ZKM is an acronym for Zbrojovka-Koucký-Malorážka, the rifle's manufacturer ([Česká] Zbrojovka), designer (Josef Koucký) and Malorážka - for rimfire rifle).

== Versions ==
=== CZ 455 Standard ===
The CZ 455 Standard rimfire rifle corresponds in its construction to the CZ 455 Lux model, but comes with iron sights and a beechwood stock with a European-style down-leaning straight comb and no cheekpiece.

==== CZ 455 Scout ====
The Scout features adjustable iron sights, integrated 11mm Dovetail iron sights. Barrel length is 16 inches; the stock is an American style beech wood with 12 inch length of pull. Total weight is 5 lbs.

==== CZ 455 FS ====
Like the CZ 452 Standard, the CZ 455 FS has a full-length Mannlicher-style stock, open iron sights, and a Bavarian-style "hog-back" stock with increased drop and an arched cheekpiece. Barrel length is 525 mm, 2,7 kg.

==== CZ 455 Long ====
The CZ 455 Long features a 24.8-inch (630mm) barrel, Bavarian-style Turkish walnut stock, and barrel-mounted tangent sights.

==== CZ 455 LUX ====
The CZ 455 LUX has a lacquered stock made from Turkish walnut featuring checkering located on the pistol grip, and is primarily designed for use with open sights. The steel barrel is fitted with fully adjustable open sights. Barrel length is 20.67 inches (525 mm), weight is 6.17 lbs. (2,8 kg) unloaded.

==== CZ 455 LUX II ====
The CZ 455 has a 24.8-inch (630 mm) long barrel with leaf sights and Bavarian-style Turkish walnut stock. Weight is 2,9 kg.

==== CZ 455 Super Match ====
The CZ 455 Super Match has a 20.67-inch (525 mm) barrel with full-adjustable open sights and 12-groove rifling intended to improve accuracy. The Super Match comes with a 10-round magazine and a Bavarian-style "hog-back" stock designed primarily for use with open sights. Weight unloaded is 6.17 lbs (2,8 kg).

==== CZ 455 Ultra Match ====
The Ultra Match features a 24.8-inch (630mm) barrel, Bavarian-style stock and barrel-mounted tangent sights adjustable for elevation. The CZ 455 barrel utilizes 12 groove rifling intended to increase accuracy.

==== CZ 455 Jaguar ====
The CZ 455 Jaguar uses an unusually long 28.6-inch (726 mm) tapered barrel with rear tangent sight and a Bavarian-style stock.

=== CZ 455 American ===
The CZ 455 American has a five-round polymer magazine and features an American-style levelled high-comb Turkish walnut stock designed solely for use with telescopic sights. The hammer-forged steel barrel is 20.67-inch (525 mm) long with a sporter contour.

==== CZ 455 Synthetic ====
Based on the CZ 455 American, but is fitted with a synthetic composite stock.

==== CZ 455 Stainless ====
Also known as CZ 455 Stainless Synthetic, it is based on the CZ 455 Synthetic, but fitted with stainless steel barrel and receiver.

=== CZ 455 Varmint ===
The CZ 455 Varmint is fitted with a 20.5 inches (520 mm) heavy-contour "bull" barrel designed to increase accuracy, and weighs 3.2 kilograms (7.1 lb). The Varmint uses the same high-comb Turkish walnut stock of 455 American, and is designed solely for use with telescopic sights.

==== CZ 455 Thumbhole ====
Based on the CZ 455 Varmint, but fitted with a heavy laminated wood stock with a thumbhole grip. It also comes with yellow- and grey-colored versions.

==== CZ 455 Evolution ====
The CZ 455 Evolution is a variant of the CZ 455 Varmint and features the standard Varmint barrelled action fitted inside a lightweight, blue-grey Boyd SS Evolution® laminated wood stock, and is primarily intended for target shooting. It also comes in a green-brown-grey "woodland" version called "Evolution GG". This model has been discontinued by CZ-USA, but still available via CZ-UB.

==== CZ 455 Varmint Tacticool ====
The CZ 455 Varmint Tacticool is a variant of the CZ 455 Varmint and features the standard Varmint barrelled action fitted inside a black Boyd Pro Varmint® stock, with a Monte Carlo comb and a vertical grip, and is primarily intended for target shooting. In North America, CZ-USA offers the Tacticool in a 16.25 inches (413 mm) barrel "Suppressor-Ready" version.

==== CZ 455 Varmint Precision Trainer ====
The CZ 455 Varmint Precision Trainer is a variant of the CZ 455 Varmint only offered by CZ-USA. It features the standard Varmint barrelled action fitted inside a GAP camouflage-pattern Manners MCS-T4 22 Trainer stock, and is primarily intended for target shooting. In addition to the standard 20.5-inch barrel, CZ-USA also offers 16.5-inch and 24-inch threaded "Suppressor-Ready" versions.

== See also ==
- Česká Zbrojovka
