= CZ 452 =

CZ 452 or BRNO .22 Rifle or ZKM-452
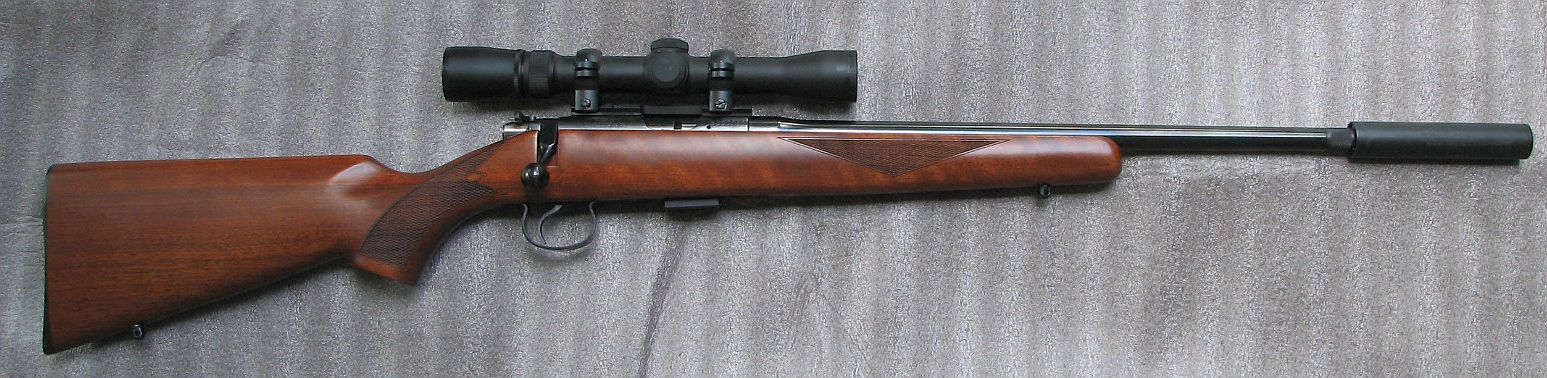
- CZ 452 with a fitted suppressor
- Type: Hunting or target rifle
- Place of origin: Czechoslovakia

Production history
- Designer: Josef Koucký (1904-1989)
- Designed: 1943-44
- Manufacturer: Česká Zbrojovka Uherský Brod
- Produced: 1956-2017
- Variants: CZ 453, CZ 513

Specifications
- Barrel length: 16.2 in (410 mm) to 28.6 in (730 mm) dependent on model
- Cartridge: .22 LR, .22 WMR, .17 HM2, .17 HMR
- Action: bolt-action repeater
- Effective firing range: 200 meters
- Feed system: 5-round detachable magazine (standard); 10- and 25-round magazines and single-shot adapter available
- Sights: open (some models); 3/8" or 11 mm dovetail rail for optional optical sights

The CZ 452, also known as BRNO Model Two .22 Rifle is a series of magazine-fed bolt-action rimfire repeating rifles manufactured by the Czech firearms manufacturer Česká Zbrojovka Uherský Brod (abbreviated "CZ-UB", English: Czech Weapons Factory — Uherský Brod) and imported into the United States by CZ-USA. Most versions of the 452 rifle series were discontinued in 2011 and replaced by the CZ 455, although CZ continues to offer the CZ 452 American in a left-hand model, with the bolt handle and ejection port located on the left side of the rifle.

During its production life, the CZ 452 was produced in several versions with various barrels, stocks and sights for a variety of rimfire cartridges such as .22 LR, .22 WMR, .17 HM2, and .17 HMR.

== History ==
First introduced in 1956 as the BRNO Model 2 (ZKM 452), the Model 452 is a refinement of the CZ Model 1 (ZKM-451) .22 calibre rimfire bolt-action training rifle that first appeared in 1947. ZKM is an acronym for Zbrojovka-Koucký-Malorážka, the rifle's manufacturer ([Česká] Zbrojovka), designer (Josef Koucký) and Malorážka - for small calibre). The Model 1 or ZKM-451 was developed on the request of the occupying German authority in 1943–44, when a very few rifles were built as fully stocked Mauser 98k type trainers. The receivers of these early .22 training rifles were marked tgf (Tschechische Gewehr Fabrik - German for Czech Rifle Factory) by the German Heereswaffenamt. Because of wartime requirements for combat weapons, assembly and production was halted on all .22 training rifles, leaving a large stockpile of parts and receivers at war's end. After the war, these parts (some of which still have the tgf code) were used along with new barrels and stocks to make the Model 1.

== Common Features ==
The CZ 452 features a carbon steel barrel that is threaded into the receiver frame, except for rifles chambered for .17 HM2 which have the barrel pinned to the receiver.

Rifles of recent manufacture feature hammer forged and lapped barrels.

The receiver has a dovetail rail for mounting a telescopic sight. The dovetail is either 11 mm or 3/8" depending on the version and cartridge.

The trigger mechanism is adjustable for weight of pull.

A detachable box magazine is used for feeding. Magazines are available in 5- and 10-round capacities for all cartridges, both in steel and plastic. A single-shot adapter and 25-round magazine are also available for use with .22 LR and .17 HM2.

== Versions ==
=== American and Special ===
The American is equipped with a 22.5" (572 mm) sporter weight barrel. The barrel and receiver have a polished and blued finish. They sit in an American-style, straight-comb, Turkish walnut stock with checkered grip and fore-end, and is trimmed with sling studs and a hard plastic butt plate. It was offered in limited quantities with beech, maple, and fancy walnut stocks. There is no provision for iron sights, as it is designed for use with a telescopic sight. The American was chambered for .17 HM2, .17 HMR, .22 LR, and .22 WMR in right-handed rifles, and for .17 HMR and .22 LR in left-handed rifles. Currently, the left-handed version is still in production.

Versions were offered with either a 16.2" or 22.5" inch barrel with the muzzle threaded (1/2" x 20 threads per inch (TPI)) to accept a sound suppressor. Adapters to allow attachment of U.S. standard (1/2" x 28 TPI) suppressors are available from several manufacturers.

The Special is identical to the American except it is provided with a matte blued finish on the receiver and a beechwood stock that is otherwise identical.

=== Varmint ===
The Varmint is equipped with a 20.5" (521 mm) straight tapered varmint/target barrel. The barrel is polished whereas the receiver has a matte finish; both are blued. The barreled action sits in a varmint-style, straight-comb, walnut stock having a checkered grip with a modest palm swell and a flat-bottomed fore-end, and is trimmed with sling studs and a rubber butt pad. There is no provision for iron sights, as it is designed for use with a telescopic sight. The Varmint was chambered for .17 HM2, .17 HMR, .22 LR, and .22 WMR.

=== Lux, Trainer, and Standard ===
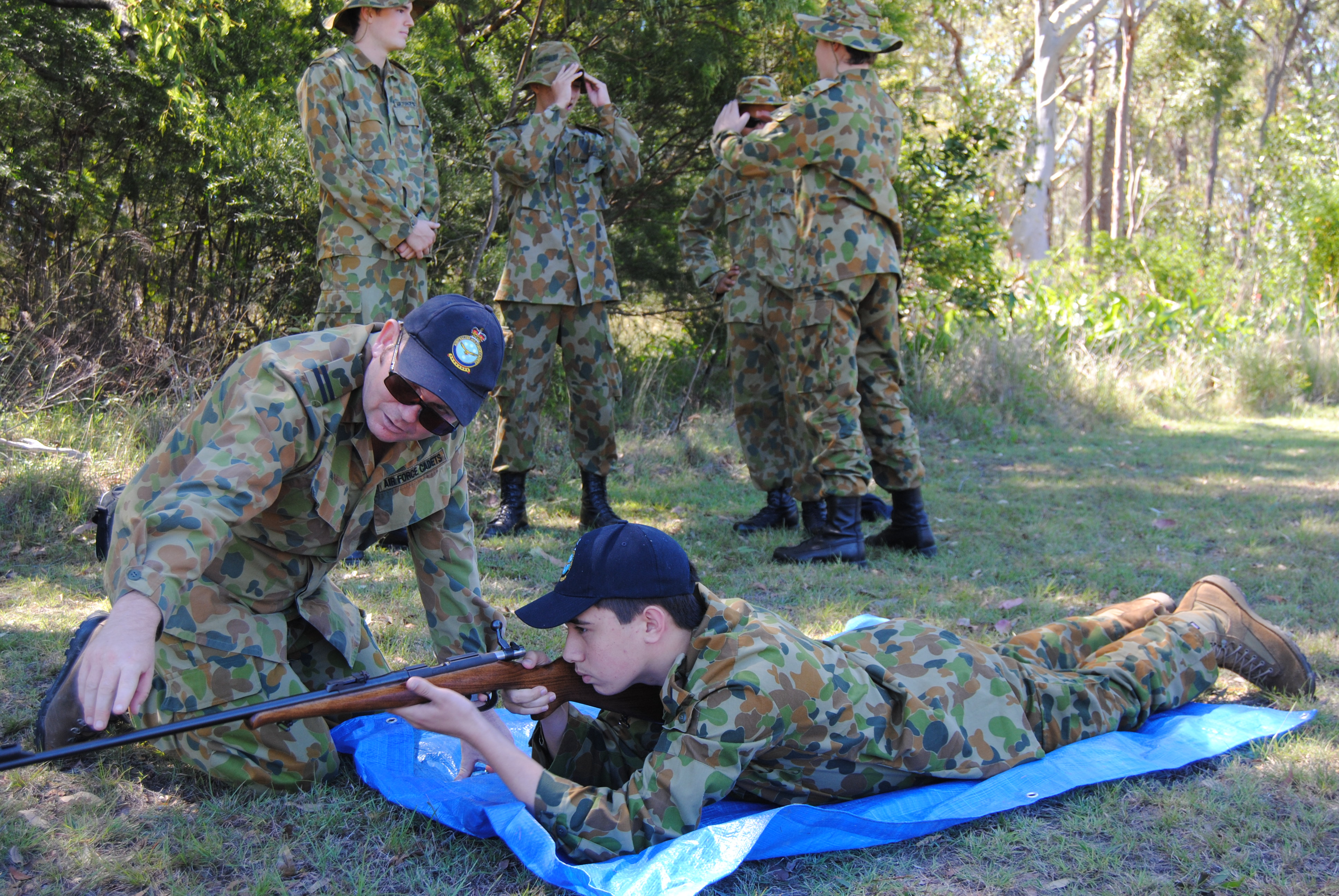
Australian Air Force Cadets using the CZ 452

The Lux is equipped with a 24.8" (630 mm) barrel that is provisioned with tangent sights. The barrel is polished whereas the receiver has a matte finish; both are blued. The barreled action sits in a walnut stock in the European-style with checkered grip, schnabel fore-end, and arched (curved) comb sometimes referred to as a Bavarian or "hogback" stock, and is trimmed with European sling swivels and a hard plastic butt plate. The lower drop at the heel and arched comb of the stock are designed to aid shooting with iron sights. The rear tangent sight is graduated in 25 meter increments with calibrated markings from 25 to 200 meters, while the sight leaf is adjustable for windage. The hooded front sight blade is adjustable for elevation. The Lux was chambered for .22 LR and .22 WMR. A left-handed version was chambered for .22 LR.

The Trainer, also known as the Special or Special Military Training Rifle, is a cadet rifle identical to the Lux except it is provided with a beechwood stock that is otherwise identical. The Trainer was chambered for .22 LR and .17 HMR.

The Standard is identical to the Trainer except the grip of the beechwood stock is not checkered. This and the Trainer is in use with many cadet organisations, a few being the Australian Air Force Cadets, Australian Navy Cadets and Australian Army Cadets.

=== Ultra Lux and Super BRNO ===
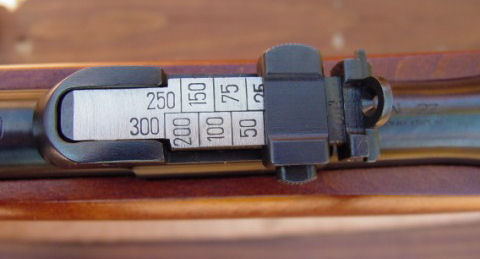
A tangent sight on a CZ 452 rimfire rifle, with calibrated markings for ranges out to 300 meters

The Ultra Lux is equipped with a 28.6" (727 mm) barrel that is provisioned with tangent sights. The extra length of the barrel is intended to improve sight radius and thus accuracy when using open sights. The barrel is polished whereas the receiver has a matte finish; both are blued. The top of the barrel is marked "SUPER EXCLUSIVE" and the trigger is gold plated. The barreled action sits in a European beechwood stock with a checkered grip, a Bavarian-style comb that also features a cheek piece, and is trimmed with European sling swivels and a rubber butt pad. Early in production, 110 rifles were made with a walnut stock. Unlike the Lux and Trainer, the tangent sight is calibrated from 25 to 100 meters in 25 meter increments, and then extends to 300 meters in 50 meter increments. The rear sight leaf is adjustable for windage, while the hooded front sight blade is adjustable for elevation. The Ultra Lux was provided with a 10-round magazine, and chambered for .22 LR.

The Super BRNO preceded the Ultra Lux. It is essentially the same; however, the finish of its beechwood stock has an orange hue, the top of the barrel is marked "SUPER BRNO SAA 2500," the trigger is silver in color, and it was provided with a 5-round magazine. These are reported to have originally been produced as training rifles for Egypt, who refused, at which point CZ made them available to the public. Production was only 2,500 rifles.

=== Scout ===
The Scout is a compact rifle intended for young shooters, with reduced stock dimensions, reduced weight, and a single-round loading device. The reduced stock dimensions and weight also make it suitable for smaller adults. The single-round loading device helps teach ammunition conservation and marksmanship. It has a shortened beechwood stock with a straight, slightly dropped comb, and a blued metal finish. It also uses notch and post sights.

=== Silhouette and Style ===
The Silhouette was designed for small-bore metallic silhouette shooting competitions, and to meet the requirements of the IMSSA. It is essentially a CZ American action and barrel in a synthetic stock with a raised comb and cheek piece. Blued metal finish.

A version was offered with a 16.2" inch barrel with the muzzle threaded (1/2" x 20 threads per inch (TPI)) to accept a sound suppressor.

The Style is identical to the Silhouette except that it features a matte nickel electroplate finish on all metal surfaces except for the bolt and trigger assemblies.

=== FS (Full Stock) ===
The FS, short for Full Stock, features a carbine length (20.7") barrel and a Mannlicher–Schönauer-style full-length Turkish walnut stock with checkering on the pistol grip and forearm. The FS features the same tangent sights as the Lux and Trainer. The dovetail rail on the receiver accepts either 11 mm (for 22 LR versions) or 3/8" (for 17 HMR and 22 WMR versions) scope rings.

=== Grand Finale ===
Released in 2017, the Grand Finale is a limited run of 1,000 rifles to commemorate the CZ 452 line. It follows the pattern of the CZ 452 American, but features an oil-finished walnut stock with ebony fore-end tip and grip cap, is hand engraved with a high polish blued finish, has a gold plated trigger, and features a custom metal magazine floor plate. It is provided with matching engraved and high polish blued scope rings.

== Variants ==
=== CZ 453 ===
The CZ 453 is essentially the same as the CZ 452; however, it is equipped with a fully adjustable single-set trigger. Some components, such as a different trigger housing and unique action screws, differ from the CZ 452 to accommodate the single set trigger, and thus the CZ 453 trigger cannot be retrofit into a CZ 452. Three versions were produced: American, Varmint, and Lux. The American and Varmint are essentially the same as the respective CZ 452 version. The Lux is akin to the CZ 452 version, but features the modern stock of the CZ 527 Lux, which features panel checkering on the grip and fore-end, a cheek piece, and a rubber butt pad. The Lux was only offered in 22 LR.

=== CZ 513 ===
The CZ 513 Basic (or Farmer as it is known outside the USA) is an economy version of the CZ 452, and with a 20.9-inch barrel and an uncheckered beechwood stock. The trigger is not adjustable, and the rear sight is a simple notch and post type.

== Criminal use ==
- A CZ 452-2E ZKM outfitted with a telescopic sight and supressor was one of two firearms used by Derrick Bird during the 2010 Cumbria shootings, Bird would later commit suicide with said rifle.
- A CZ 452-2E ZKM outfitted with a telescopic sight and supressor was one of the two rifles used by Eero Samuli Hiltunen during the 2012 Hyvinkää shooting.
- A CZ 452-2E ZKM outfitted with a telescopic sight was one of the rifles used by the Train family, specifically Stacey Train, during the 2022 Wieambilla shootings.

== See also ==
- Česká
