= Kit car =

Automobile that the buyer assembles into a functioning car

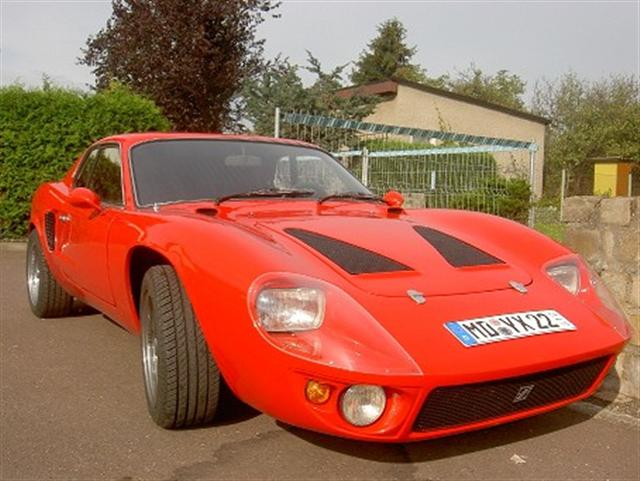
Fiberfab FT Bonito, a kit car on a VW Beetle chassis

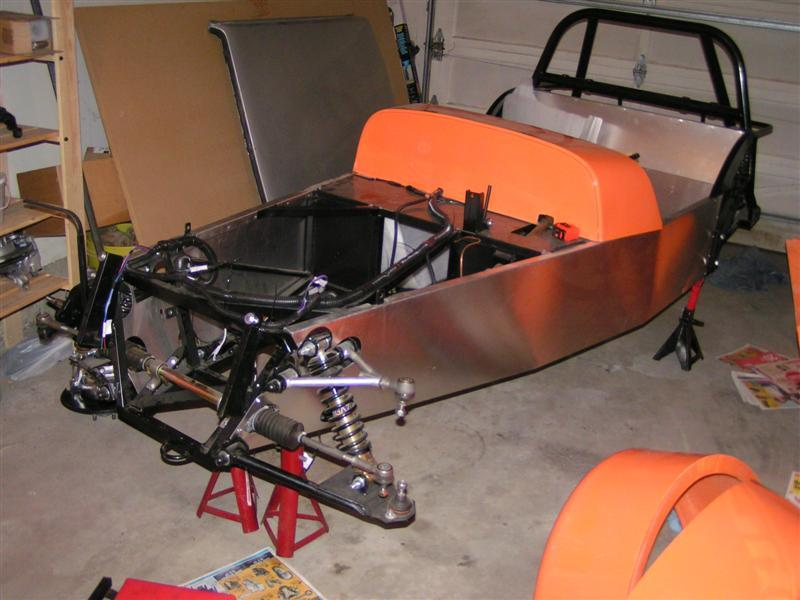
Locost frame and body panels

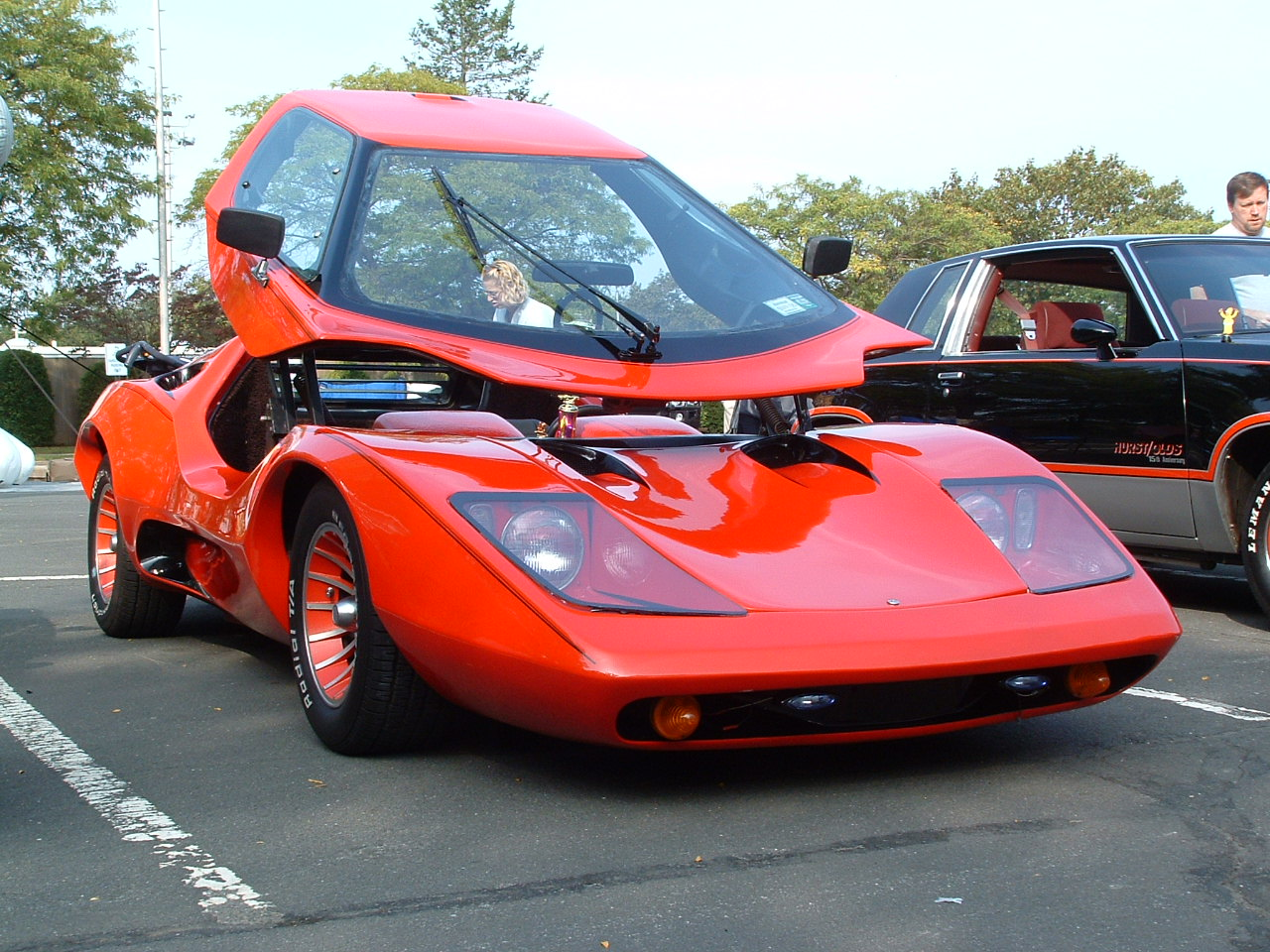
1972 Sterling Nova/ Purvis Eureka/ Eagle (South Africa)

A kit car is an automobile available as a set of parts that a manufacturer sells and the buyer then assembles into a functioning car. Usually, many of the major mechanical systems such as the engine and transmission are sourced from donor vehicles or purchased new from other vendors. Kits vary in completeness, consisting of as little as a book of plans, or as much as a complete set with all components to assemble into a fully operational vehicle, such as those from Caterham.

== Related terms ==
A subset of the kit car, commonly referred to as a "re-body", is when a commercially manufactured vehicle has a new (often fiberglass) body put on the running chassis. Most times, the existing drive gear and interior are retained. These kits require less technical knowledge from the builder. Because the chassis and mechanical systems were designed, built, and tested by a major automotive manufacturer, a re-body can lead to a much higher degree of safety and reliability.

The definition of a kit car usually indicates that a manufacturer constructs multiple kits of the same vehicle, each of which it then sells to a third party to build. A kit car should not be confused with:

- a hand built car or special car, which is typically modified or built from scratch by an individual for a specific purpose (such as hillclimbing, road or circuit racing, or record attempts). "Rally specials" and "homologation specials" have, especially since the Second World War, typically referred to special series-produced cars built by manufacturers.
- a component car, which is a self-assembly car in which 100% of the parts required to build the car are purchased from a single company. Component cars are distinguished from kit cars as all parts are quality controlled and designed to fit together perfectly. They can be built in significantly less time than a "kit car". See also knock-down kit, a term usually applied to a similar but larger commercial exercise.

== History ==
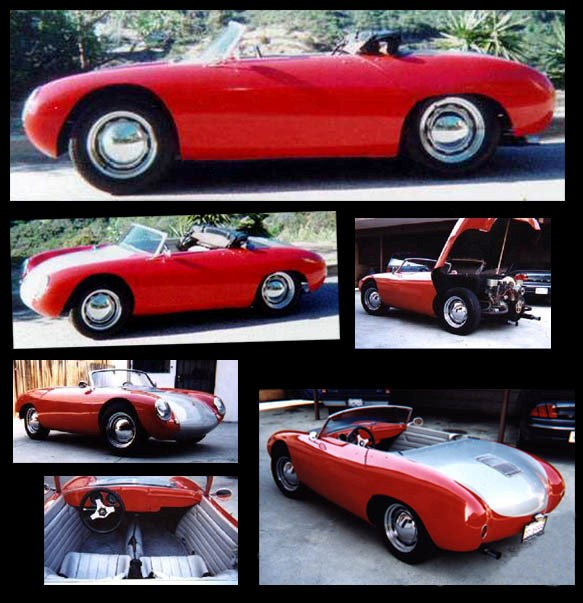
Replica of Porsche 550 Spyder made from a kit

Kit cars have been around since the earliest days of the automobile. In England in 1896, Thomas Hyler-White developed a design for a car that could be assembled at home. Technical designs were published in a magazine called The English Mechanic. In the US, the Lad's Car of 1912 could be bought for US$160 ($5,000 in 2023) fully assembled or US$140 ($4,400 in 2023) in kit form.

In 1949, Derek Buckler made the first UK kit car. His goal was to bring motorsports to a larger market by selling affordable car kits. This sparked an emergence of small kit car firms between 1949 and 1973. They were producing a wide range of designs and specifications. These early kits were targeted at amateur motorsports, some of which include trials, races, rallies, and sprints. Car production had increased considerably and with rustproofing in its infancy, many older vehicles were being sent to breaker yards as their bodywork was beyond economic repair. An industry grew up supplying new bodies and chassis to take the components from these cars and convert them into new vehicles, particularly into sports cars. Fiber-reinforced plastic was coming into general use and made limited-scale production of automobile body components much more economical. In the UK up to the mid-1970s, kit cars were sometimes normal production vehicles that were partially assembled. This avoided the imposition of a purchase tax, as the kits were assessed as components and not vehicles.

Early kit car manufacturers relied on donor cars to complete their kits. The most commonly used donor cars were the Austin Seven, Austin-Healey Sprite, and Ford Prefect. These cars provided a perfect platform to build off of, and were used by many home-build manufacturers. Some of which include Lotus, Ashley, and Microplas.

During the 1970s, many kits had bodies styled as sports cars that were designed to bolt directly to VW Beetle chassis. This was popular as the old body could be easily separated from the chassis, leaving virtually all mechanical components attached to the chassis. A fiber-reinforced plastic body from the kit supplier would then be fitted. This made the Beetle one of the most popular "donor" vehicles. Examples of this conversion include the Bradley GT, Sterling, and Sebring which were made by the thousands. Many are still around today. Volkswagen-based dune buggies also appeared in relatively large numbers in the 1960s and 1970s, usually based on a shortened floor pan.

In the early 2000s, kit car manufacturers such as Factory Five Racing began incorporating robotic automation into their manufacturing process. A company by the name of Product-ion Technology Inc. collaborated with Factory Five Racing to create an automated panel trimming process. Factory Five Racing uses a gel-coated fiberglass-reinforced plastic to build the body panels for each kit. These panels need to be trimmed to size and were originally cut by hand, which could take up to 7.5 hours to complete just four sets of panels. With the new robotic trimming system, the time has been reduced. The robotic trimming systems have also increased accuracy and consistency, reducing the reject rate of new panels.

Current kit cars are frequently replicas of well-known and often expensive classics. They are designed so that anyone with the right technical skills can build them at home to a standard where they can be driven on the public roads. These replicas are in general appearance like the original, but their bodies are often made of fiberglass mats soaked in polyester resin instead of the original sheet metal. Replicas of the AC Cobra and the Lotus Seven are particularly popular examples. The right to manufacture the Lotus 7 is owned by Caterham Cars, who bought the rights to the car from Lotus founder Colin Chapman in 1973. Caterham cars are component cars and are a continued development of Chapman's design. All other Lotus Seven-style cars are replica kit cars costing significantly less than the Caterham without the residual value. These replica kit cars enable enthusiasts to possess a vehicle closely resembling a vehicle that they may not be able to afford due to scarcity, and at the same time take advantage of modern technology. The Sterling Nova kit originally produced in the UK was the most popular VW-based kits being produced worldwide. It was licensed under several different names with an estimated 10,000 sold.

A common concern about kit cars is that it appears to many to be technically impossible to assemble a car at home and license it for public roads, including meeting standards for the mandatory quality control (road worthiness test) that is required in most countries. For example, to obtain permission to use a kit car in Germany, every such vehicle with a speed over 6 km/h without a general operating license (ABE) or an EC type permission (EC-TG) has to undergo a technical inspection by an officially recognized expert. In the United Kingdom it is necessary to meet the requirements of the IVA (Individual vehicle Approval) regulations. In the United States SEMA has gone state by state to set up legal ways for states to register kit cars and speciality vehicles for inspection and plates.

A survey of nearly 600 kit car owners in the US, the UK and Germany, carried out by Dr. Ingo Stüben, showed that typically 100–1,500 hours are required to build a kit car, depending upon the model and the completeness of the kit. As the complexity of the kits offered continues to increase, build times have increased. Some accurate replica kits may take over 5,000 hours to complete.

Several sports car producers such as Lotus, Marcos, and TVR started as kit car makers.

== Types ==
Kit cars are offered in two different types. The first type is complete kits; complete kits contain every part needed for the construction of the car. The second type is partial kits; these kits come with some parts, but the builder is required to outsource some parts from other “donor cars”.

== Kit car manufacturers ==
=== Australia ===
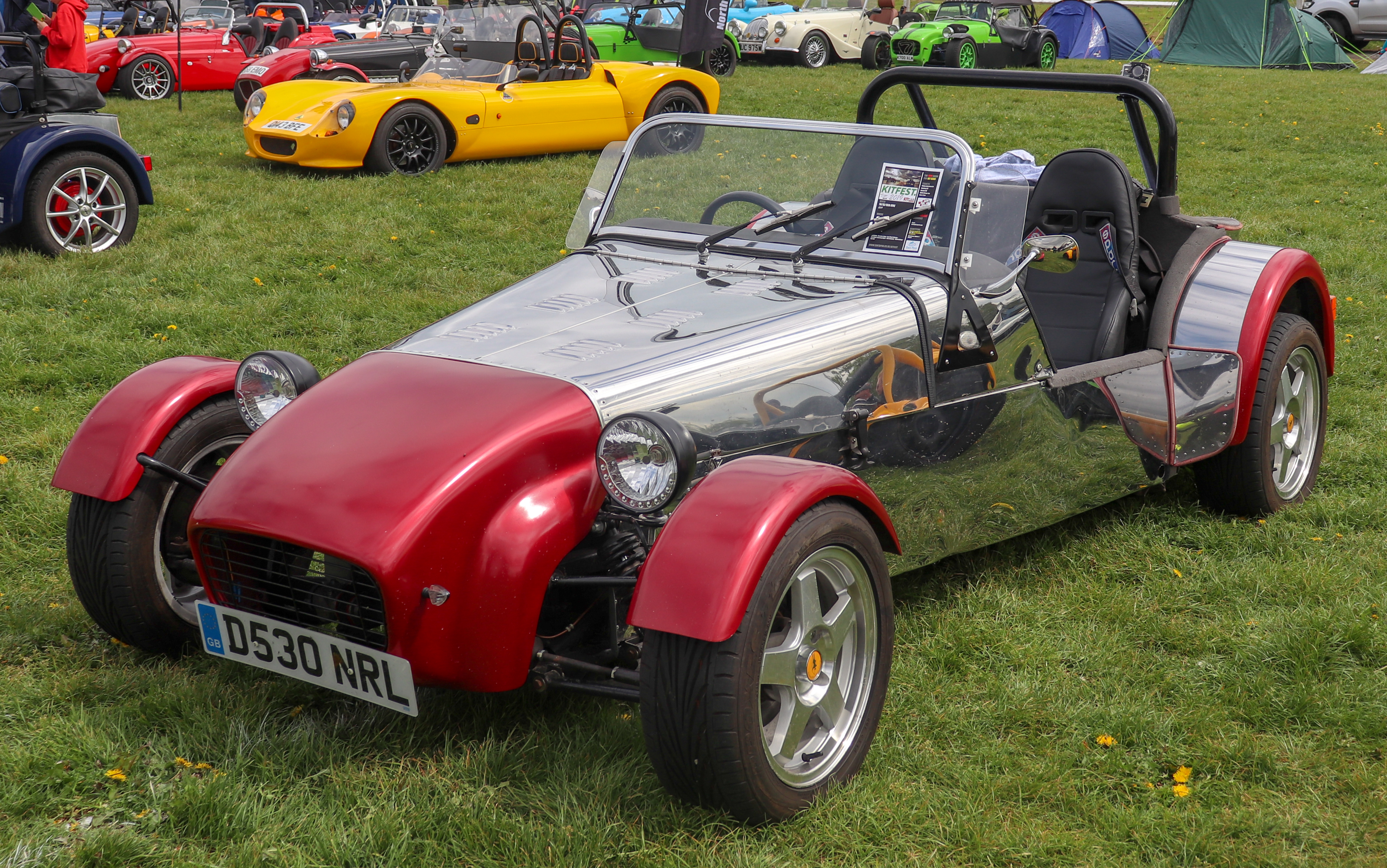
A Robin Hood kit car

- Alpha Sports
- Bolwell
- Pellandini Cars
- PRB
- Purvis Eureka
- Elfin Sports Cars
- Bushrangie
- J&S Hunter Coupe

=== Austria ===
- Custoca

=== Belgium ===
- Apal

=== Canada ===
- Spex Design Corporation

=== Germany ===
- Apal
- Fiberfab
- Michalak Design
- Hoffmann 2CV

=== Italy ===
- Puma Automobili – buggies and VW-based sports cars

=== Mexico ===
- Unidiseño Mastretta

=== Netherlands ===
- Burton
- Ruska

=== New Zealand ===
New Zealand had a long history of small garages and vehicle enthusiasts modifying and creating sports and sports racing cars. In the early 1950s, with the advent of fibreglass bodied cars, a new opportunity arose for local companies associated with car enthusiasts to create car bodies. Among these early manufacturers was Weltex Plastics Limited of Christchurch, which imported a Microplas Mistral sports car mould and began making bodies and chassis in 1956. They were followed in 1958 by Frank Cantwell's Puma and Bruce Goldwater's Cougar. Also in New Zealand during this period, Ferris de Joux was constructing a variety of sports racers. De Joux is noted in particular for his Mini GT from the 1960s.

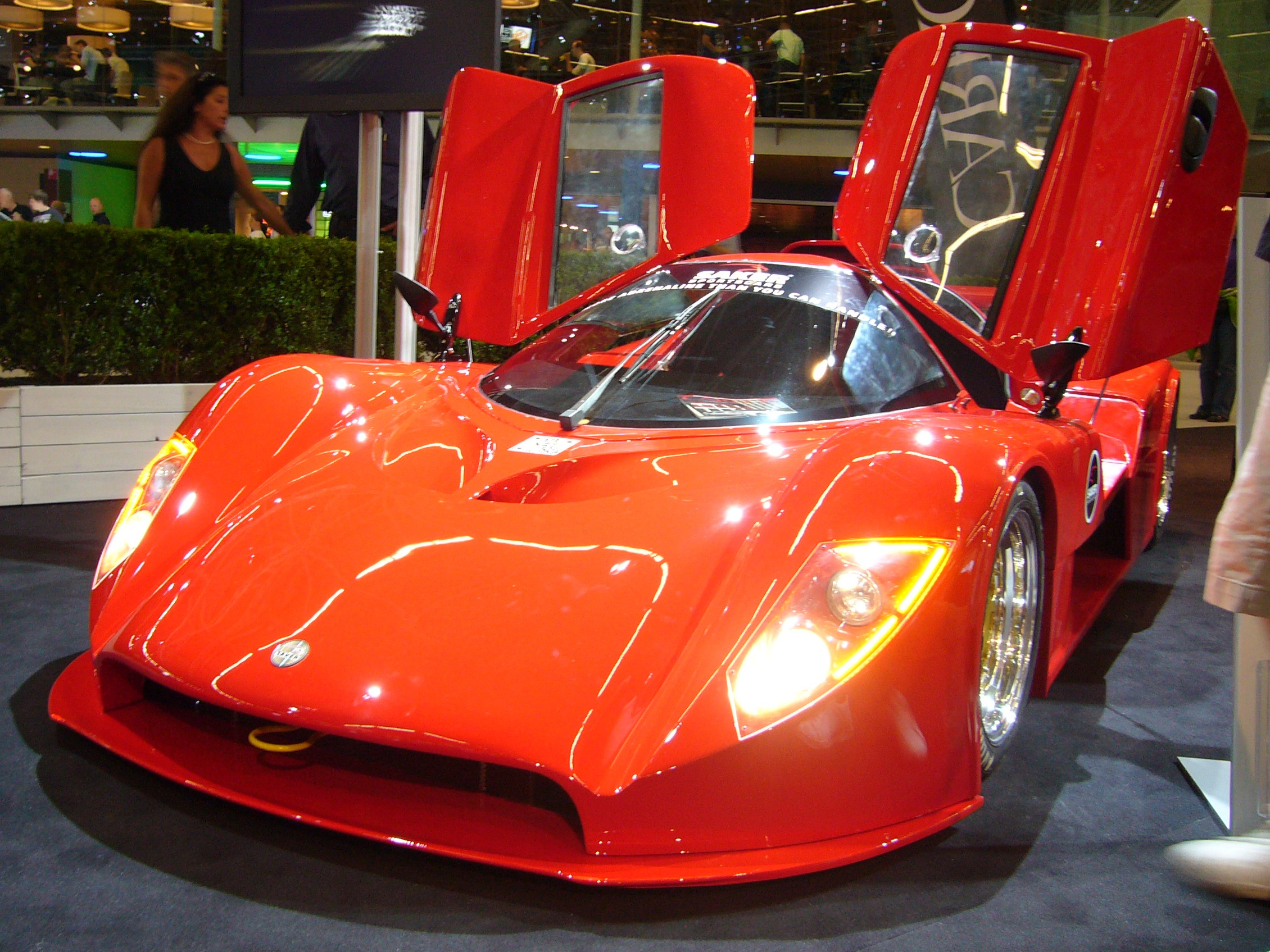
Saker GT

Ross Baker's Heron Cars started in 1962 making racing cars and eventually began producing kit cars in 1980. Bill Ashton, formerly of Microplas and Weltex, joined with Ted George in the 1960s and made the Tiki. Three were known to have been made. Graham McRae with Steve Bond of Gemini Plastics imported a replica Le Mans M6B styled GT mould in 1968, The cars were made and sold by Dave Harrod and Steve Bond of Fibreglass Developments Ltd, Bunnythorpe as the Maram. McRae went on to make a Porsche Spyder replica in the 1990s.

A number of new companies entered the market in the 1980s – Almac 1985, Alternative Cars (1984), Cheetah (1986), Chevron (1984), Countess Mouldings (1988), Fraser (1988), Leitch (1986), and Saker (1989). Some recent ones are Baettie (1997), which became Redline in 2001 and moved to the United Kingdom in 2007 as Beattie Racing Limited, and McGregor (2001).

Two companies who specialise in making replicas of various models to order are Classic Car Developments (1992) and Tempero.

=== Slovakia ===
The K1-Attack Kit car is produced by Slovak company K1 Styling & Tuning. Their cars are customizable and have come in many different variations since 2001. K1 offers engines produced by Honda, Toyota, etc. in the 130HP to 800HP range. Due to its light weight it achieves the same power output–weight ratio as Lamborghini Gallardo, Audi R8, or Ferrari F430 even with a 280 hp engine.

The (cheapest) complete kit costs around $15,000, and is based on the Honda Accord 4/5G F20/F22 (2.0L–2.2L) engine. A complete kit with Honda Civic Type-R 9-10G K20C1 achieves 320HP (at request, the engine can be tuned to 400–500HP). Many more engines, such as Honda K24, Toyota 3SGTE are available.

Customer projects have included engines such as the VW 1.9 TDI, VW 1.8T, (not specified) 2.0 Subaru engine, 2.5L V6 Ford, 3.0 V6 Jaguar, 3.0 I6 BMW, or 4.2L V8 from Audi R8.

Though based in Slovakia, the company markets itself as producing Czech-Slovak products.

=== South Africa ===
- Birkin Cars, building a copy of the Lotus Super 7.

The specialist car builder Hi-Tech Automotive does not venture to supply cars in kit form at all, but only builds fully-assembled "turnkey-minus" continuation series cars with chassis, bodywork and interior trim finished off, ready for engine installation. Almost all cars are exported, mostly to the United States as "glider kits".

=== Sweden ===
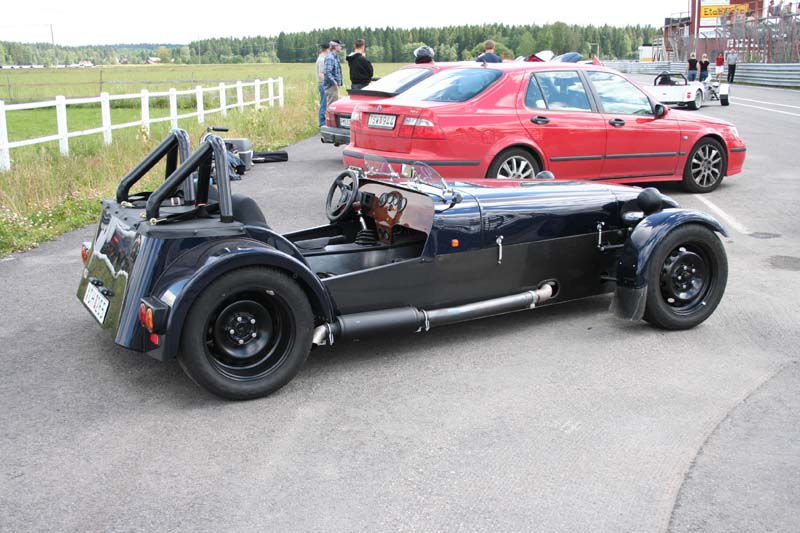
Dala 7, is a sevenesque kit-car made in Stora Skedvi, close to Säter in Dalarna.

Technically, kit cars are not allowed in Sweden, but provided that most of the components and material are sourced by the builder personally it is possible to register them as amateur built vehicles. Before the law requiring a mandatory crash test in 1970 there was a booming kit car industry in Sweden with most companies basing their kits on the VW Beetle chassis. By the time amateur-built vehicles were once again allowed in 1982, all kit car makers in Sweden were out of business.

The inspection (SVA equivalent) in Sweden is handled by the car builders' association SFRO who does two inspections: one when the car has reached the rolling chassis stage and the second when the car is finished. Amateur-built cars are currently limited to a power ratio of 15 kW (20.4 PS) per 100 kg (182 hp/ton). Until 2003, the limit was 10 kW (13.6 PS) per 100 kg, so for very light cars (like a Lotus 7 type car) it was a problem to find a suitable engine.

- Hult Healey
- Mania Spyder
- Mascot
- Ockelbo
- Pagano
- Racing Plast Burträsk (RPB)
- Roadline, Porsche Speedster and Porsche Boxer RS replicas

=== United Kingdom ===
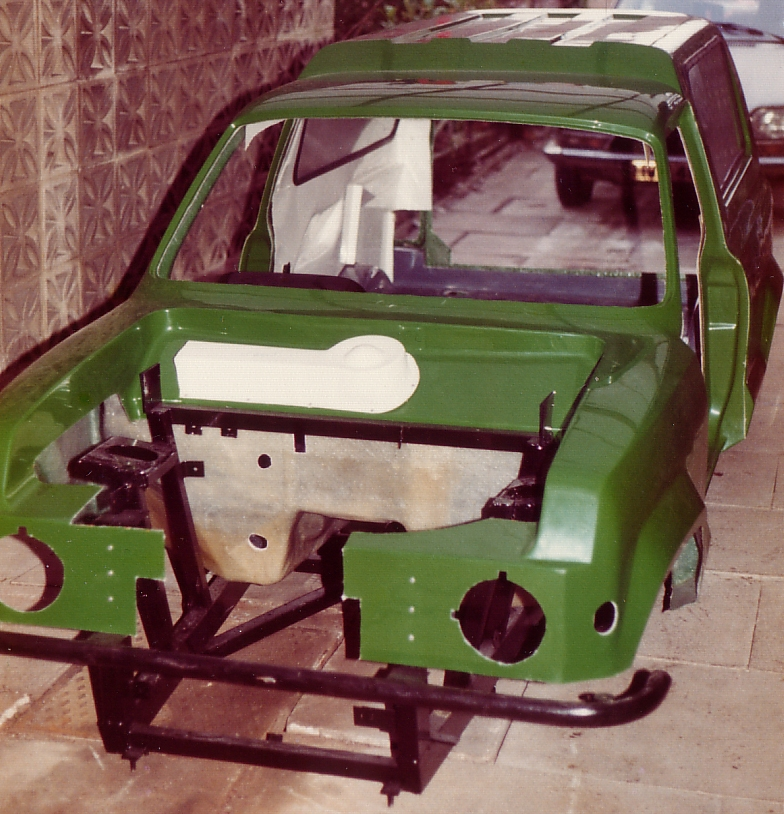
Dutton Sierra kit car chassis and GRP bodywork prior to installation of mechanical components

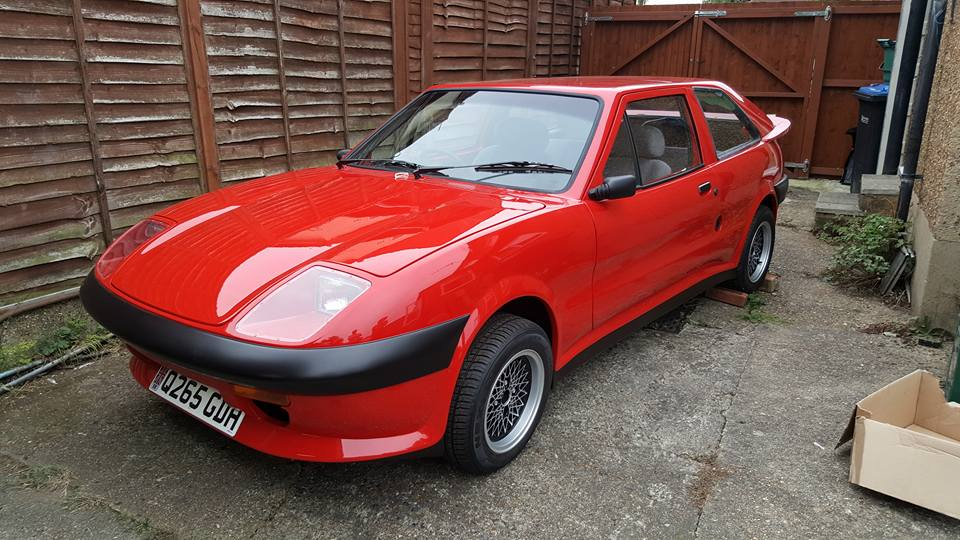
Quantum Mark 1 Hatchback, one of very few kit cars to have a glass-reinforced plastic (grp) monocoque construction

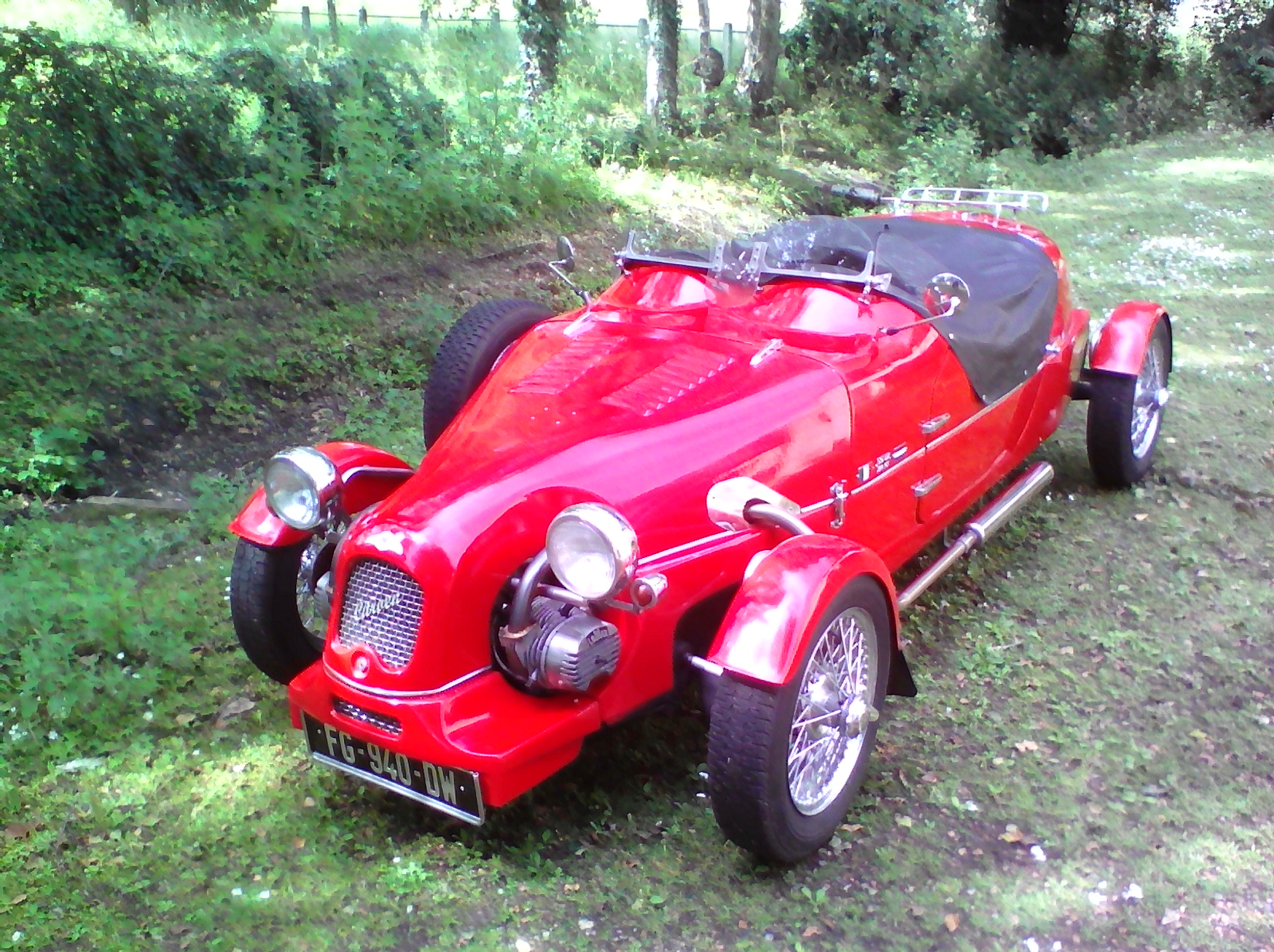
Lomax 224

Vehicle regulations in the UK allow the production of up to 200 vehicles a year without the extensive regulation and testing requirements applied to mass-market vehicles. This has led to an expanding industry of small producers capable of offering partial and complete kits, some for export, and finished vehicles for domestic use.

The Driver and Vehicle Licensing Agency (DVLA) regulate kit cars in the UK, which helps to ensure that vehicles used on the road are safe and suitable for the purpose. The current test for this is Individual Vehicle Approval (IVA), which has replaced Single Vehicle Approval (SVA). When SVA was first introduced in 1998, many believed this would kill off the kit car market, but in reality it has made the kit car market stronger, as the vehicles produced now have to meet a minimum standard. IVA was introduced in summer 2009 and it is too early to tell what impact this will have on the industry.

A significant number of kit cars do not receive a 'Q' registration plate, which signifies a vehicle of unknown or mixed age. All kit cars are subject to a Vehicle Identity Check, VIC, by the DVLA to determine the registration mark a kit car is assigned. This will be either, a new, current year, registration; an 'age-related' registration; or a 'Q' plate. Once a kit car has been correctly registered, a V5C, or log book, will be assigned and then a kit car is treated in exactly the same way as a production car, from any larger manufacturer. A kit car must pass its MOT test and have a valid car tax, or have a valid Statutory Off-Road Notification (SORN) declaration. As part of the IVA, a kit car can sometimes be permitted to assume the age of a single, older car (the donor car) if the major parts were taken from it in its construction. If the age identifier assigned to a kit car falls before 1980 the vehicle may be road taxed free of charge.

According to figures given to Kit Car magazine, the most popular kit in the United Kingdom in 2005 was made by Robin Hood Sportscars, who sold 700 kits a year. The editor of Kit Car Magazine suggests in 2016 the MEV Exocet was the best selling kit car.

- AK Sportscars
- Arkley SS
- Ashley Laminates
- ADD Nova
- Banham Conversions
- Beauford automobiles
- Buckler Cars
- Burlington Cars
- Clan
- Covin
- Dakar 4x4
- Dax
- Davrian
- Diva
- Dutton Cars
- Eagle (SS)
- Elva
- Embeesea Kit Cars
- Fairthorpe Cars
- Falcon Shells
- Gardner Douglas
- GCS Hawke
- Gentry Cars
- Ginetta Cars
- GKD sports cars
- Great British Sports Cars
- GTM Cars
- Heron Plastics
- Hustler
- Jago
- JBA Cars
- JZR Trikes
- Locost
- Locust
- Lomax
- Marcos
- Mills Extreme Vehicles
- McCoy
- Marlin
- Microplas
- Midas Cars
- Moss Cars
- Onyx Sports Cars
- Opperman
- Peel
- Peerless / Warwick
- Piper Cars
- Quantum Sports Cars
- Raw
- Robin Hood
- Rochdale
- Scamp
- Siva
- Sylva
- Spartan Cars
- Tiger Racing
- Tornado
- Trident
- Turner Sports Cars
- Ultima Sports
- Westfield Sportscars

=== United States ===
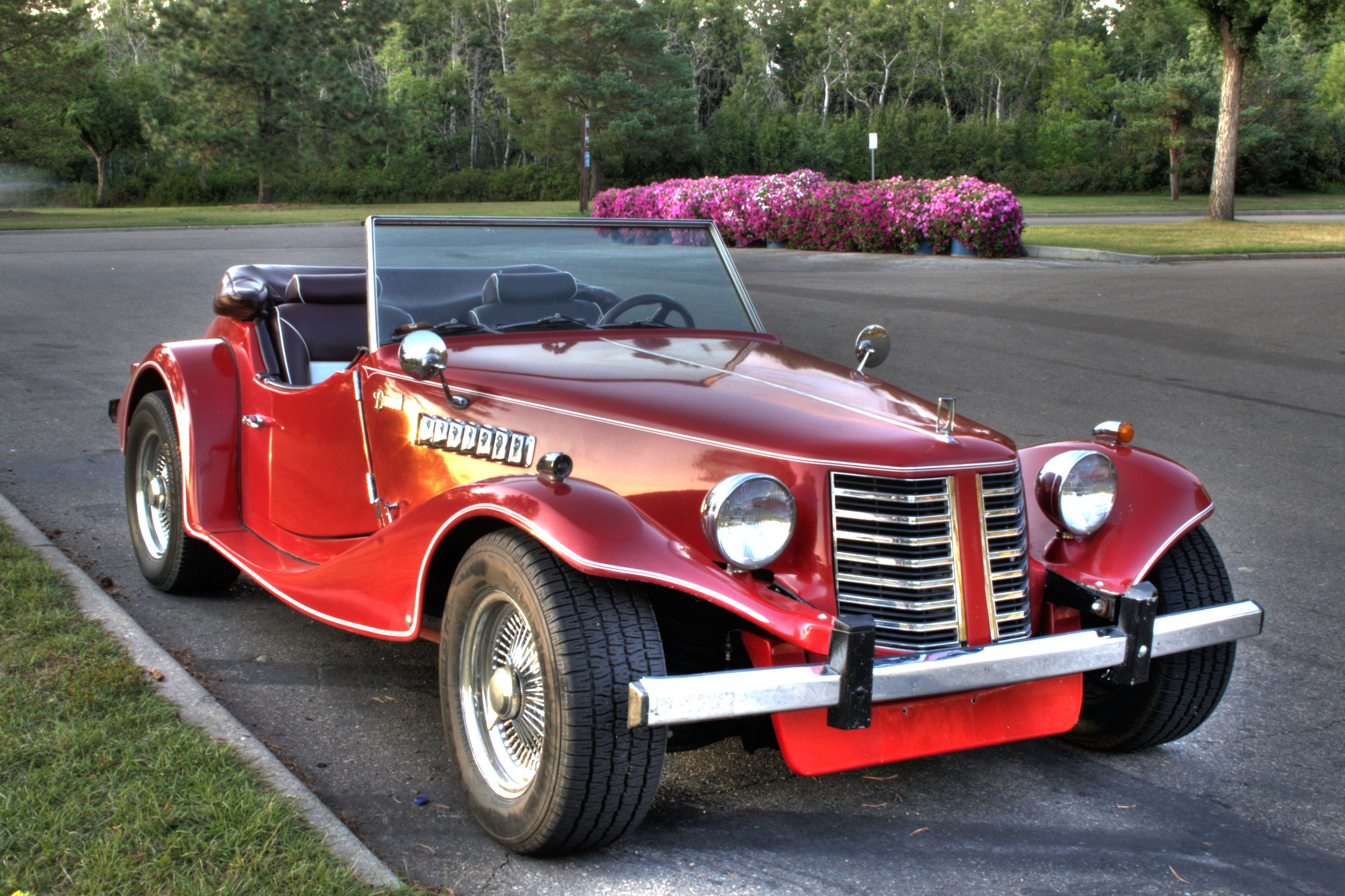
A Bernardi roadster, from the Blakely Auto Works

A glider kit is a term used in the United States for a kit of components used to restore or reconstruct a wrecked or dismantled vehicle. Glider kits include a chassis (frame), front axle, and body (cab). The kit may also contain other optional components. A motor vehicle constructed from a glider kit is titled as a new vehicle.

More common terms include "partial-turnkey," "turnkey-minus," and (though it technically refers to a vehicle without a body, rather than body without drivetrain) "rolling chassis," or "roller."

The world's leading producer of component kit cars is Factory Five Racing. It was founded in the United States in 1995. They use a panel trimming process to build a wide range of models. The body panels used on these cars are made from a gel-coated fiber-class reinforced plastic.

Examples of US kit manufacturers and cars include:

- Blakely Auto Works
- Bradley Automotive
- Classic Motor Carriages (CMC)
- DDR Motorsport
- Devin Enterprises
- Factory Five Racing – Manufacturer of Cobra replicas as well as the GTM Supercar, and 818 of their own design
- Fiberfab
- Kelmark Engineering
- Sterling Sports Cars – Car from the US also known as the Nova in the UK
- La Dawri
- Lad's Car
- McBurnie Coachcraft
- Meyers Manx
- Pangra – Turbocharging, water-injection and body rework of the Ford Pinto
- Street Beasts
- Velo Rossa Spyder and Coupe (resembles Ferrari 250 GTO) by Reaction Research
- SSZ Motorcars
- Superformance
- Vaydor

== See also ==
- Knock-down kit, a collection of parts required to assemble a product
- Manufacturer's Certificate of Origin, document certifying the country of origin of merchandise
- Open-source car, a car with a design that is easily available and can be used, modified and shared freely
