= Covin (automobile) =

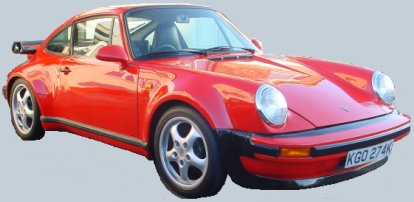

Overview
- Production: Early 1980s–1992 Approx

Body and chassis
- Body style: 2-door coupe 2+2; 2-door convertible 2+2
- Layout: Rear engine, rear-wheel drive
- Platform: Covin own or VW Type3 chassis
- Related: Volkswagen Variant Type 3

Powertrain
- Engine: Various fitments
- Transmission: 4-speed automatic 4 speed manual

Dimensions
- Wheelbase: 87.2 in (2,215 mm)
- Length: Coupe: 165.2 in (4,196 mm)
- Width: Coupe: 72.1 in (1,831 mm)
- Height: Coupe: 50 in (1,270 mm)

The Covin is a kit car replica of the Porsche 911 Turbo, created by Tim Cook and Nick Vincent in the early 1980s. The name "Covin" originated from CO (Cook) and VIN (Vincent), resulting in the name "COVIN Performance Mouldings." Initial versions of the Covin were constructed using a shortened Beetle floorplan and running gear, while later models featured a dedicated Covin chassis and VW Type 3 running gear.

During the 1990s, the company was acquired by DAX, which was later purchased by GPC. Following the relocation of the company to County Galway, Ireland, the production of the Covin ceased. The exact timeline of this discontinuation is not specified.

The Covin was available in three body styles, all based on the Turbo model. The flatnose and coupe models were also offered as convertibles. Only one narrow body Covin is known to have been produced. Additionally, Covin produced a limited number of 356 Speedster models.

== The Covin Club ==
The Covin Owners Club is managed by Darren Parker, who serves as the club's technical adviser, and Michael Dykes, who is the club secretary. As of 2015, the Covin forum had 378 members and 24,487 posts, encompassing 2,762 topics.
