= RPB =

RPB may refer to:

- Racing Plast Burträsk, Swedish company
- Rally for the People of Burundi
- Reverse path broadcast, a routing method similar to reverse path forwarding
- Reverse penhold backhand, a grip in table tennis
- RPB subunits of RNA polymerase, encoded by POL genes
