= AK Sportscars =

AK Sportscars Limited
- Company type: Limited Company
- Industry: Automobiles
- Founded: 1992
- Headquarters: Peterborough, Cambridgeshire
- Key people: Jon Freeman
- Website: https://www.aksportscars.co.uk/

AK Sportscars Limited is a British manufacturer of automobiles.

== Company history ==
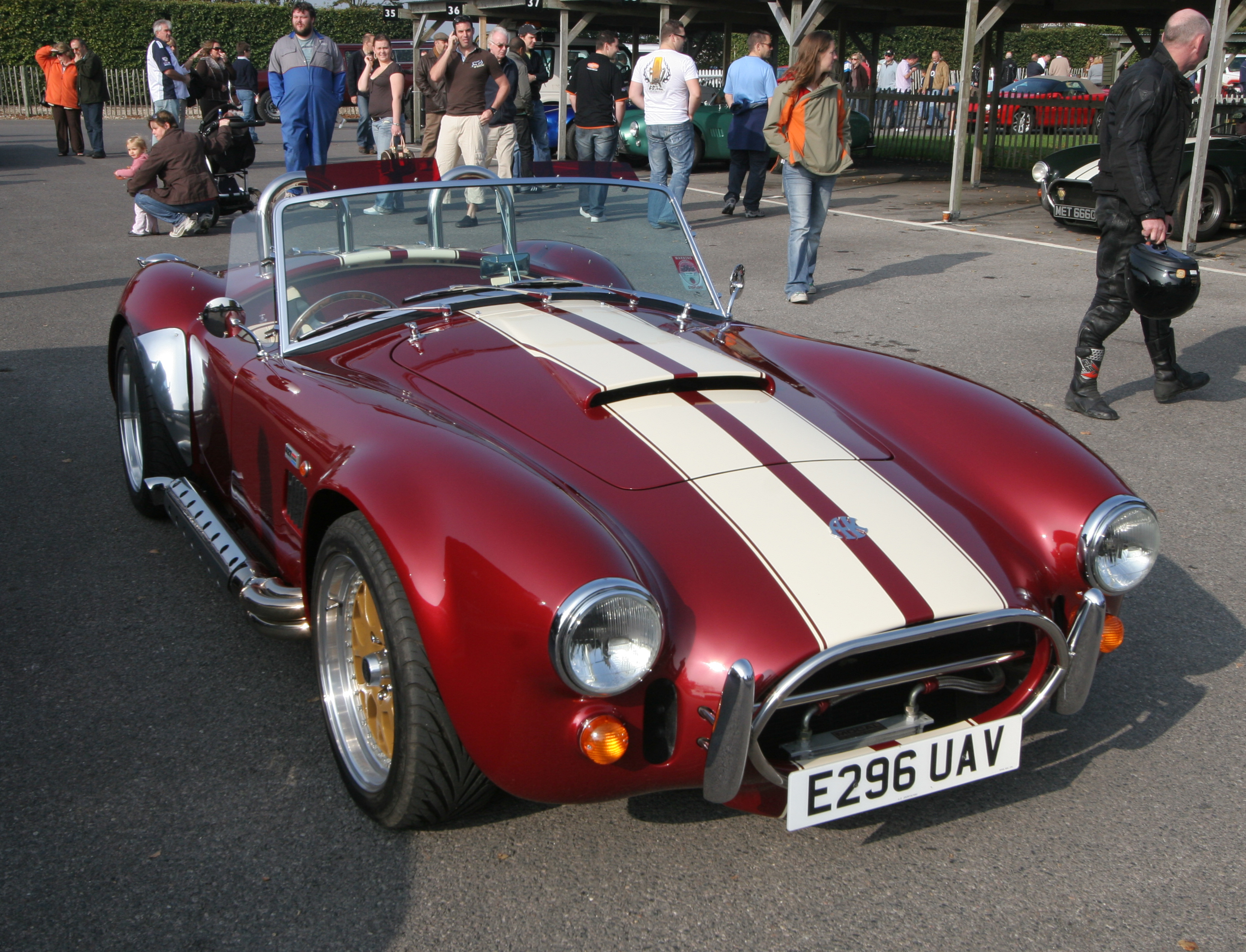
AK 427

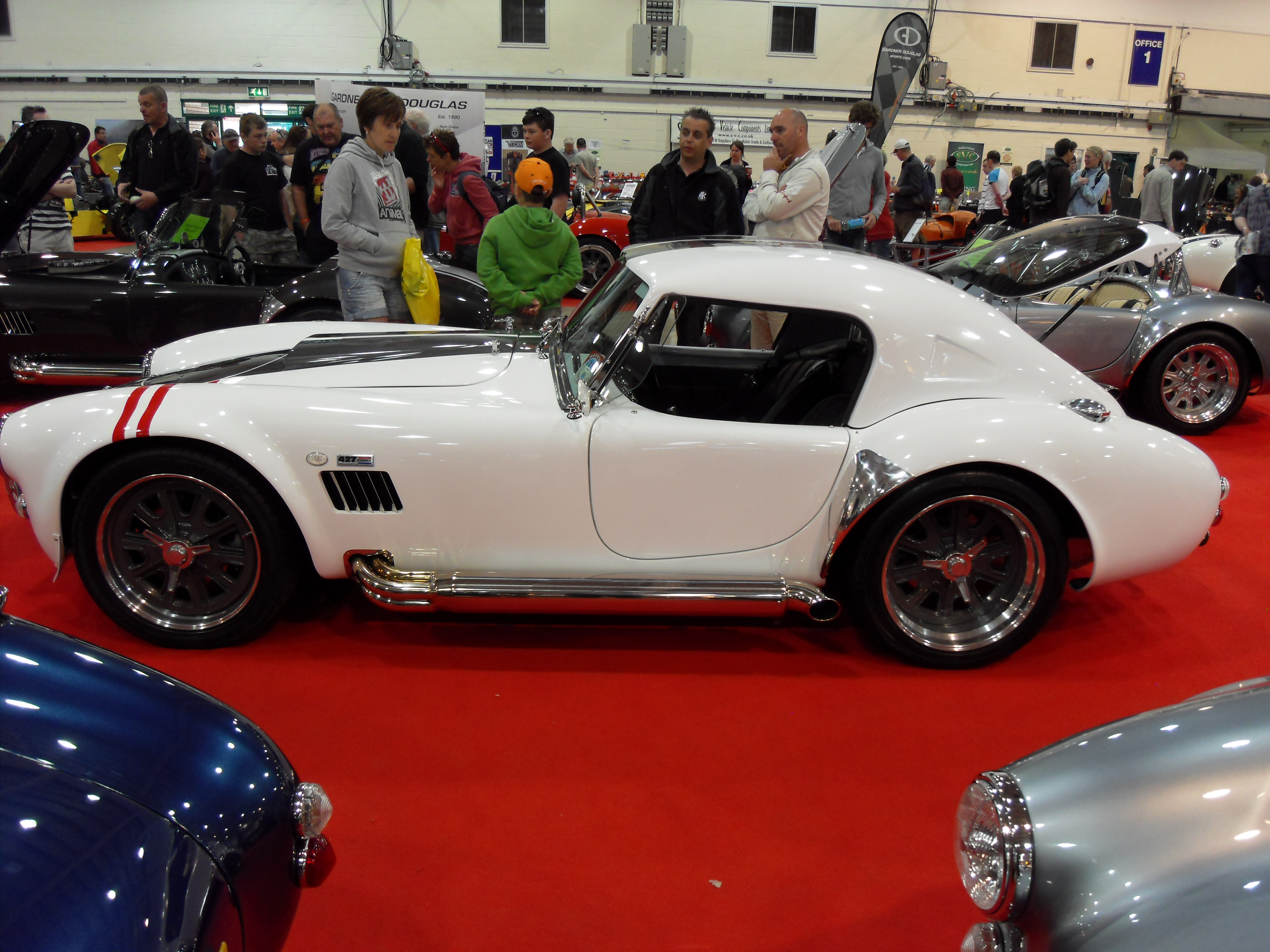
AK 427 Hardtop

Ken Freeman and Alan Frew founded the company in Peterborough, Cambridgeshire, in 1992. They began producing automobiles and kits. The brand name was initially KF, then a little later AK, which stood for the initials of their first names. Ken's wife Lynda and their sons Dan and Jon supported the two men. Jon Freeman took over as director in 2009 when Ken and Lynda Freeman retired and is supported by his wife Wendi. So far around 300 vehicles have been built. In 2021, Southern GT was taken over and this company's model, a replica of the Ford GT40, will be offered as the AK 40.

== Vehicles ==
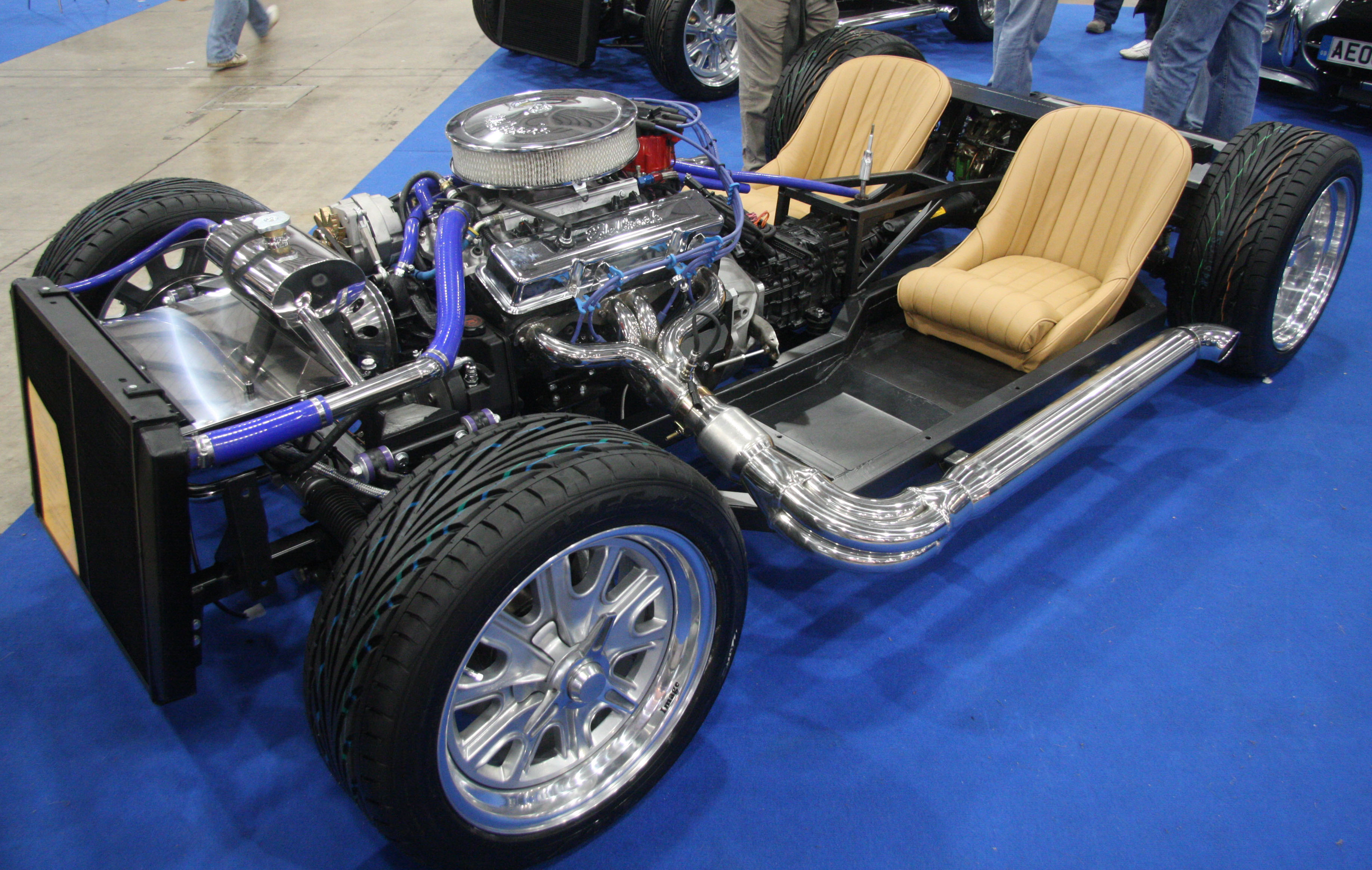
AK 427 Chassis

The Premier model appeared under the KF brand. This was the replica of the AC Cobra.

A little later it became the 427 under the AK brand. A steel ladder frame forms the basis. An open fiberglass body is mounted on top. Various V8 engines power the vehicles.

== Literature ==
- G.N. Georgano (Editor-in-Chief): The Beaulieu Encyclopedia of the Automobile. Volume 1: A-F. Fitzroy Dearborn Publishers, Chicago 2001, ISBN 978-1-57958-293-7, p. 23.
- Steve Hole: A-Z of Kit Cars. The definitive encyclopaedia of the UK's kit-car industry since 1949, Haynes Publishing, Sparkford, 2012, ISBN 978-1-84425-677-8, p. 22 and 136
