= Moss Cars =

Moss Cars was a British kit car manufacturer active between 1981 and 1997. Originally doing business in Sheffield as the Moss Motor Company, they renamed the company Moss Sportscars after a fire in 1985. A period of instability followed, with various investors taking over but not meeting with any success; the company finally became Moss Cars after a move to Bath in 1987. The company was defunct in 1997, although some sources state that kits were still being produced as late as 2000. Their designs were all by founder John Cowperthwaite, who also founded JC Autopatterns, creator of the JC Midge and Locust cars. The company built three main designs, all GRP bodyshells originally intended to be placed atop a Triumph Herald/Vitesse or Spitfire chassis.

== History ==
Cowperthwaite started out by restoring MGs from 1975; in 1981 he launched his own company and designs.

By the early 1980s, Heralds and Spitfires were gradually becoming hard to find, or at least more expensive. To solve this problem, Moss developed their own chassis for their kits. The new, bespoke chassis could be fitted with either Ford or Triumph mechanicals. After the fire, Cowperthwaite founded a series of new companies (Moss Sportscars, JC Autopatterns, CSA Character Cars, Hampshire Classics) in rapid succession, trying to keep his cars in production, but none made more than a handful until he sold the rights to outside investors who founded Moss Cars (Bath) in 1987.

Moss' designs included the Roadster/Malvern, clearly inspired by the Morgan +4, "Malvern" being a reference to Malvern, Worcestershire, where the Morgan Motor Company has been operating for over a century. Their second design was the simple Monaco, a barrel-shaped, cycle-fendered design with a small windscreen and minimal creature comforts. While built out of GRP, the body incorporated visual references to classic, aluminium-bodied racers such as false rivets and seams. The third design was the Mamba, a short-lived design inspired by the earlier, Giulietta Spider-inspired Auto Kraft Continental kit. Herald/Vitesse-based, it used a plywood/fibreglass sandwich floor. Only a handful were built by Moss between 1983 and 1985, and the kit has been described as "crude" and of low quality. During 1987, this was also briefly offered as the Mamba Phoenix by CSA Character Cars out of Radstock.

== Products ==
Model	Image	Period	Number produced	Description
Moss Roadster		1981–2000	~2,000	Classic, two-seater British roadster, vaguely similar to a Morgan. A 2+2 version called the Moss Malvern was presented in 1983. Built on the Herald/Vitesse chassis or later on a ladder frame chassis with Ford Cortina mechanicals. From 1992, the car was also available for Sierra underpinnings which meant that larger engines such as the Rover V8 could also be fitted.
Moss Monaco		1981–2000	~300	A simple, cycle-fendered design - "a barrel on wheels" according to the designer. Also on the Herald/Vitesse chassis; later on, a ladder frame chassis with Ford mechanicals was offered.
Moss Mamba		~1983–1987	10-22	Roadster, inspired by Auto Kraft Shells' AKS Continental, itself inspired by the Alfa Romeo Giulietta Spider. Built on the Herald/Vitesse chassis; from 1984 it could also be based on the rear-wheel drive Ford Escort (Marks 1 or 2).
Moss Malvern		1983–2000	~500	A 2+2 variant of the initial, Morgan-inspired Roadster; the name refers to Malvern, Worcestershire, home of the Morgan Motor Company.
