= Hoffmann 2CV =

The Hoffmann 2CV Cabrio is a kit car based on the Citroën 2CV.

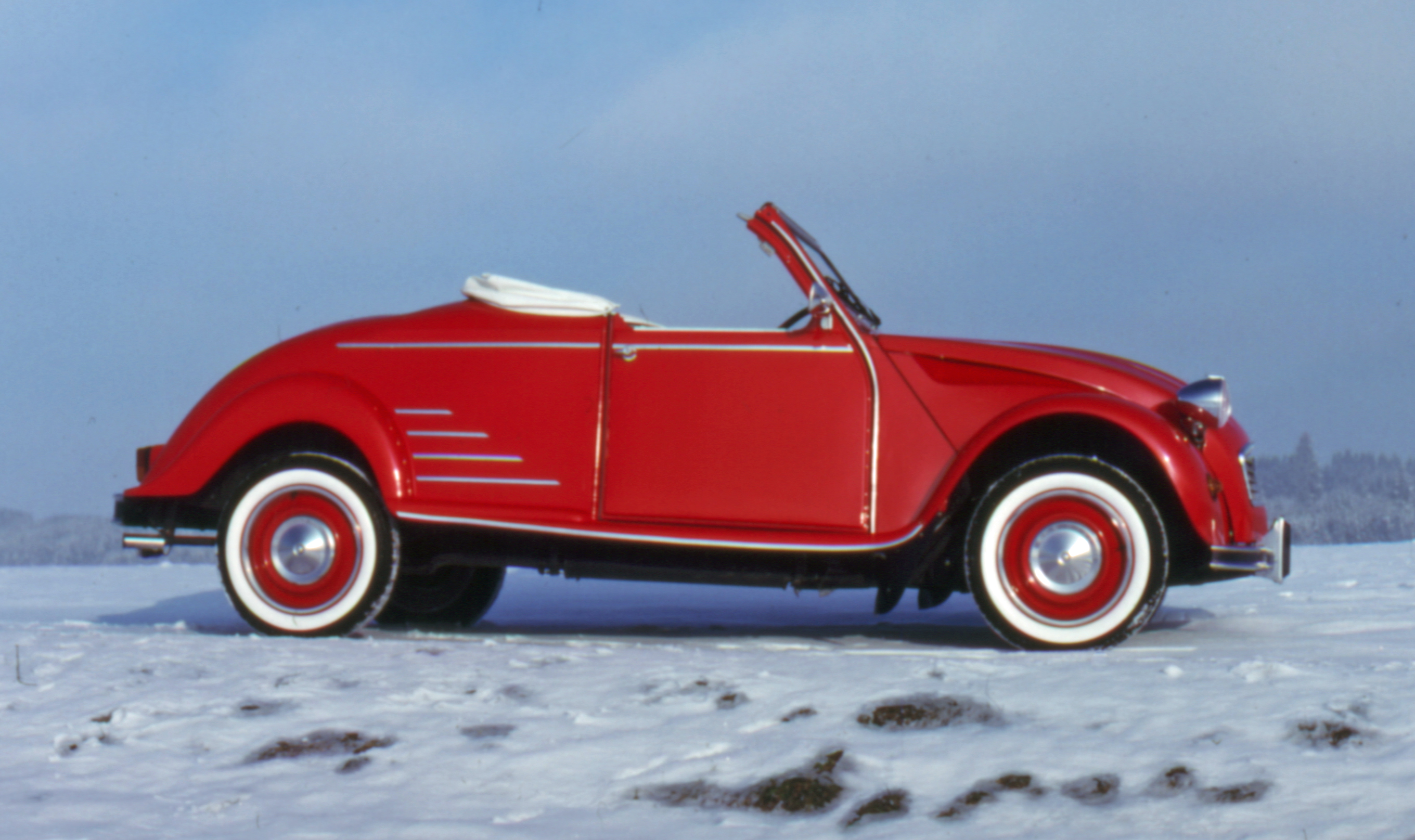
Hoffmann 2CV Cabrio

In 1988, Wolfgang Hoffmann developed the design and the first prototypes. Approximately 250 professionally manufactured vehicles left the workshop in Hohenfurch, and a number of other 2CV cars were assembled as homemade kit cars. The kit contained a fibre glass reinforced plastic body with steel frame, two side windows, soft-top, trunk lid and all necessary screws, bolts, hinges etc.

Approximately 1700 Hoffmann 2CV were built in total, with some 250 of them having been built by Wolfgang Hoffmann at his factory in Hohenfurch, Germany, and the rest being assembled by consumers who ordered them as kits. They were exported across Europe with a small number also exported to the United States.

The company that produced the Hoffmann 2CV remains active to this day, producing and selling spare parts for the Citroën 2CV, and other Citroën A-Types, such as stainless steel chassis and fibre glass body parts.
