= SFRO =

Swedish car organisation

SFRO (Sveriges fordonsbyggares riksorganisation) is a Swedish national organisation founded in 1982 with the goal of making it possible to register amateur-built vehicles. The goal of SFRO is to help builders to build their own vehicles and register them for road use. The types of vehicles SFRO handles are rebuilt vehicles (such hot rods and lowriders) and amateur-built vehicles (specials or kit cars). SFRO can also inspect imported vehicles that would not otherwise be possible to import. They are then regarded as rebuilt vehicles.

== See also ==
- Tractor § EPA tractors in Sweden
