= Beauford automobiles =

British automobile manufacturer

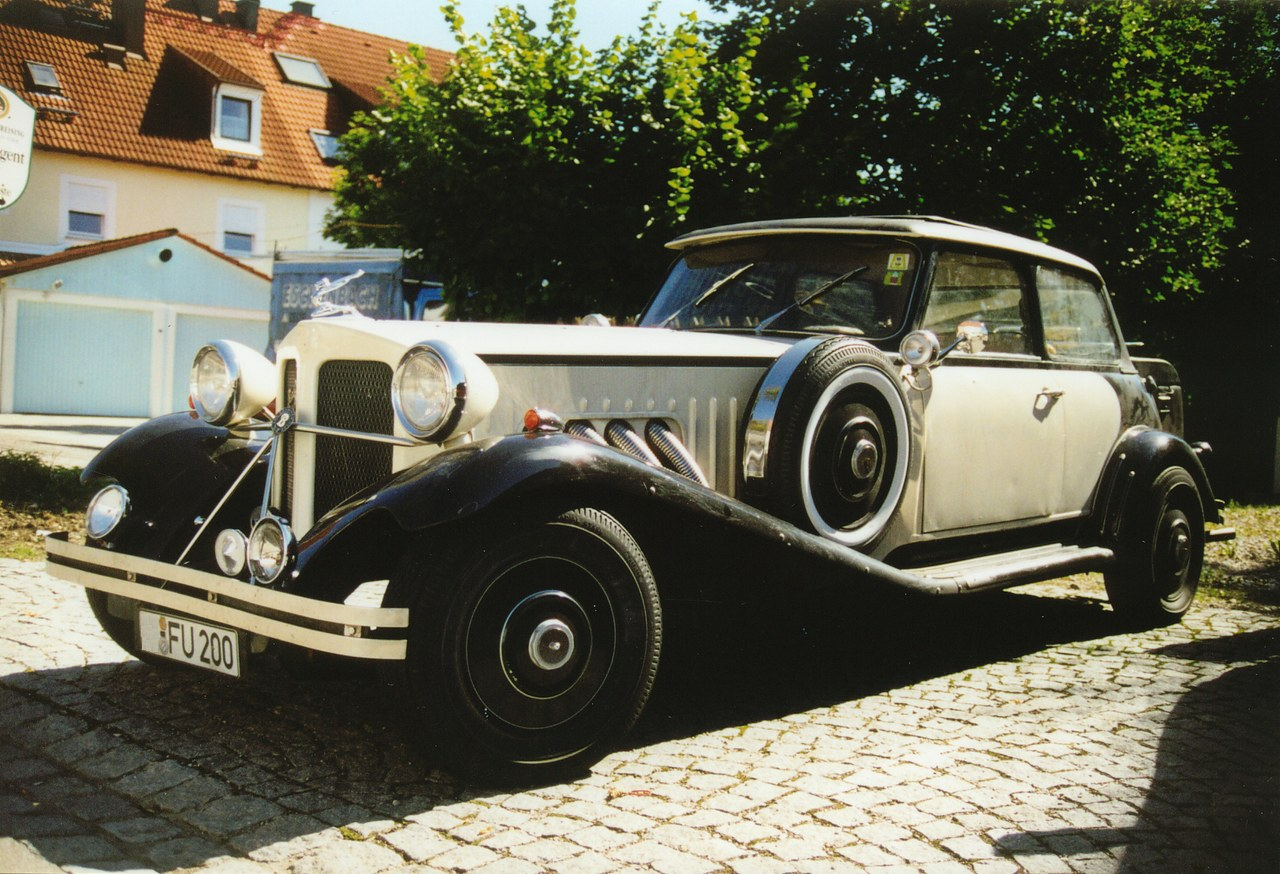

Beauford was a British family run automobile company based in Biddulph, Stoke on Trent. The cars were supplied in kit form and were therefore highly customisable. Beauford were founding members of S.T.A.T.U.S. (Specialist Transport Advisory and Testing Utility Society). The company was dissolved in September 2025.

== History ==
Originally based in Upholland, Lancashire the company later moved to Stoke on Trent. The first cars were made in 1978 and used a Mini bodyshell as the passenger compartment later replaced by a glass fibre moulding. The company supplied over 1,500 kits.

== Design ==
The Beauford Tourer is designed to look like a vintage car. At the front is a long bonnet with flowing wings at either side to give the appearance of a 1930s Style Grand Tourer luxury car. There are both 2 door and 4 door versions. Cars come in both open and closed bodies. With detachable hard top or convertible soft top there are also half soft-top versions. Because of the classic look of the vehicles the cars have become popular as wedding transport. They are suited to Rover V8 engines, and the M119 5 liter Mercedes Benz engine with over 300 BHP and high torque.

== Technical ==
The shell of the body is made of Glass Reinforced Plastic (GRP), and the bonnet and panels are alloys. The body is mounted on a ladder chassis. The vehicles have a long wheel base of 3.2 m (126"). A variety of power units can be fitted to the kit, including Ford, Nissan and Rover. The suspension, steering, pedal box and master cylinder can be sourced from the Ford Sierra. The manufacturer provides multiple choice in body parts such as windscreens and lights, meaning there are many unique vehicles in circulation.

== Specifications ==
DIMENSIONS
475cm (15’ 7") long
168cm (5’ 6") wide
152cm (5’ 0") high
WHEELBASE
320 cm (10’ 6")
WEIGHT allowed on axle

1st axle 975 kg 2nd axle 850 kg

1,000 kg (2,200 lbs) approx
ENGINE
1593 ccm the engine produced 53 kW (71 hp) of power

and 156 N·m (115 ft·lbf) of torque.136 CO2/km (combined)

TRANSMISSION
Either Manual or Automatic

gearboxes may be used

RUNNING GEAR
Front & rear suspension, steering,

pedal box, master cylinder & handbrake lever - Ford Sierra or Cortina.

CHASSIS
4" x 2" x 1/8 (100 x 50 x 3mm)

steel box section ladder chassis

BODY & PANELS
Glass Reinforced Plastic (GRP)

body with alloy bonnet & closing panels

== The Beauford Club ==
There is an owners club known as The Beauford Club. They attend automotive events and produce publications for members.
