= Custoca =

Austrian car manufacturer

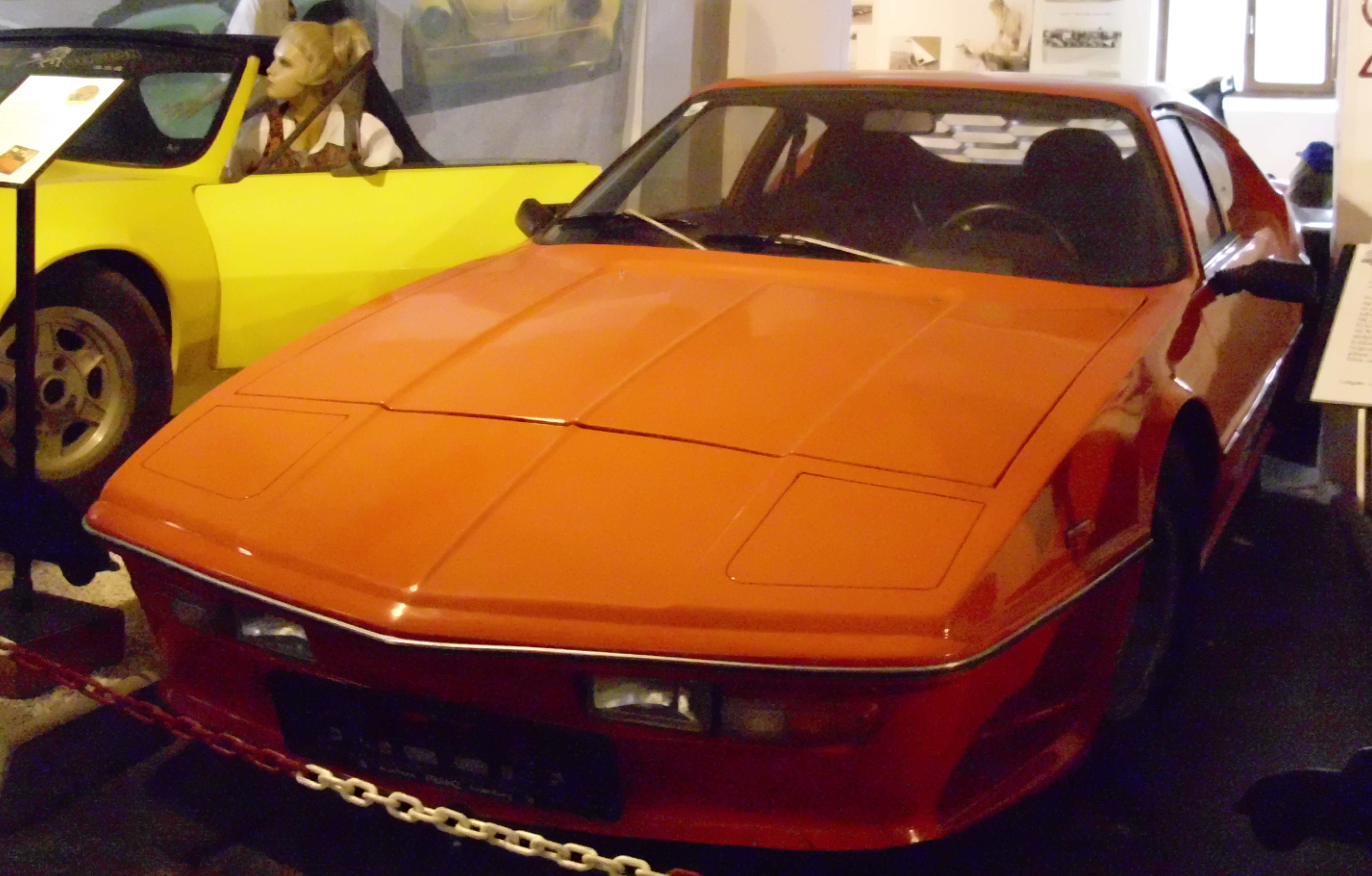
Custoca Taifun

Custoca (also Custoka), was a low-volume Austrian car manufacturer established by Gerhard Höller in 1966 to build and sell kit cars. Models included the Ford GT40-inspired Hurrycane introduced in 1971, the Lamborghini-like Strato, and, beginning in 1972, a range of dune buggies based on the popular Volkswagen Beetle. After 135 Stratos, and approximately 100 Hurrycanes were produced and sold, the company folded in 1988.
