= McBurnie Coachcraft =

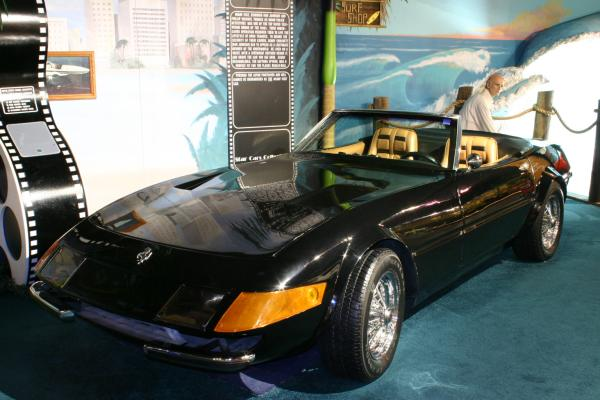
A replica Ferrari Daytona used in Miami Vice

McBurnie Coachcraft was a US bodywork company mostly known for their replicas of Ferrari Daytona Spyder. McBurnie also manufactured a Ferrari 250 GTO replica in the style of the Alpha One GTO and the Velo Rossa (See, Ferrari S.p.A. v. McBurnie Coachcraft, 10 U.S.P. Q.2d 1278 [S.D.Cal.1988]).

The Daytona replicas are based on the Chevrolet Corvette C3 and became very popular because they were featured in the TV series Miami Vice where the main character Sonny Crockett drives a black Daytona Spyder. Ferrari took legal action to stop McBurnie and other replica manufacturers from producing replicas, under the legal principle of trade dress. A fire caused by arson at McBurnie's shop on April 28, 1989 (less than a year after the case was decided) caused significant damage to the building and the vehicles inside it.

Later Tom McBurnie joined forces with Michael Van Steenburg and manufactured the 34 Lightening Thunderod, a hot rod kit in addition to replicas of the Porsche 550 and Porsche 356 Speedster with the company name Thunder Ranch. He produced the RIOT car as seen on the television series Baywatch. He partnered with San Diego State University to make an electric RIOT car with hybrid technology. The rights to the RIOT were sold to Nathan Wratislaw.

In 2012 McBurnie sold his company to Carrera Coachwerks partners Theo Hanson and Alan Cassell. Anticipating a dispute with Porsche, the name was changed to Custom Coachwerks in 2013 or 2014. However, the El Cajon, California shop was later closed and its assets were divided by the partners.

== See also ==
- Kit car
- Pontiac Fiero
