= Michalak C7 =

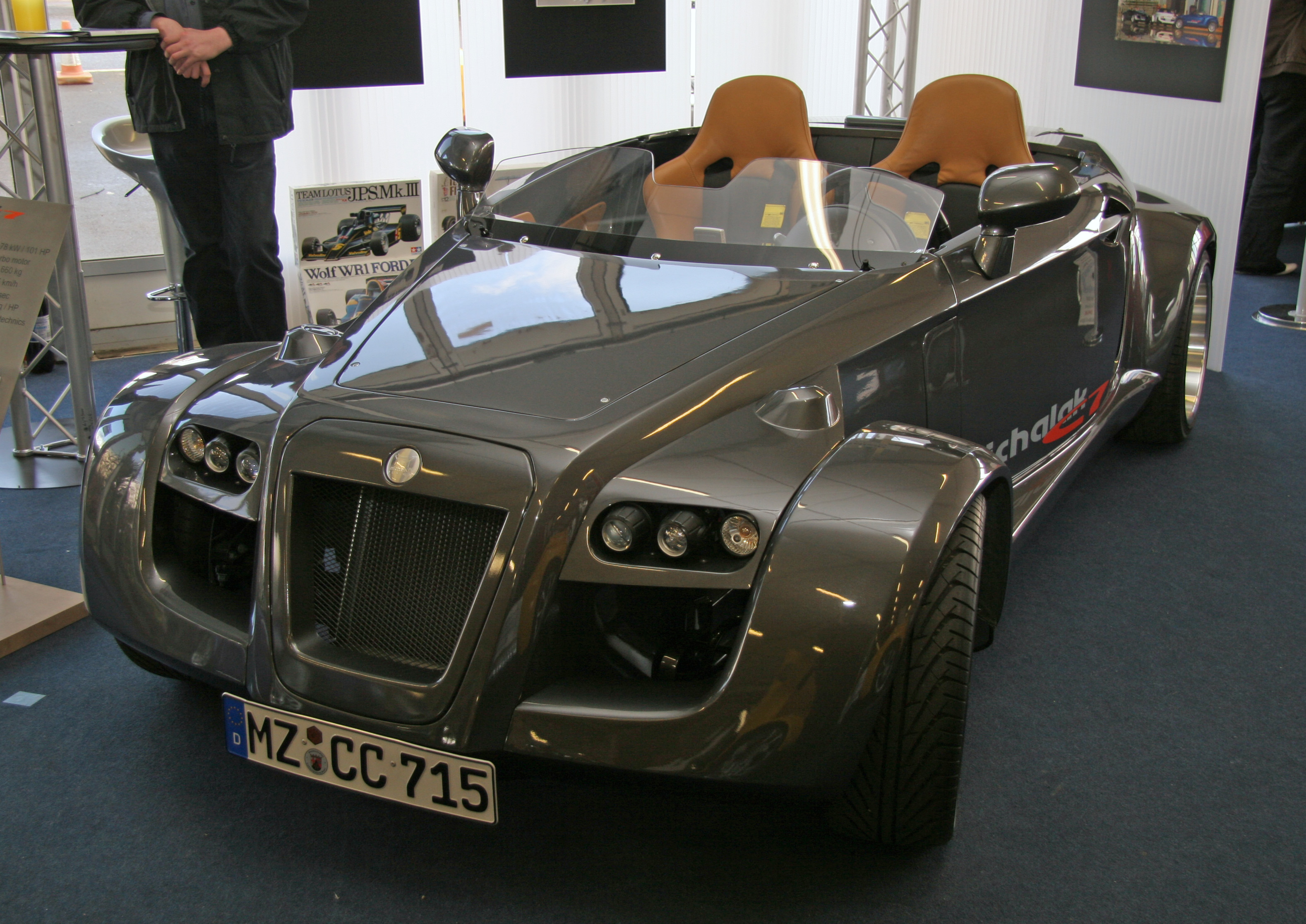

Overview
- Manufacturer: Michalak Design
- Production: 2004–2011

Body and chassis
- Body style: Roadster
- Related: Smart ForTwo

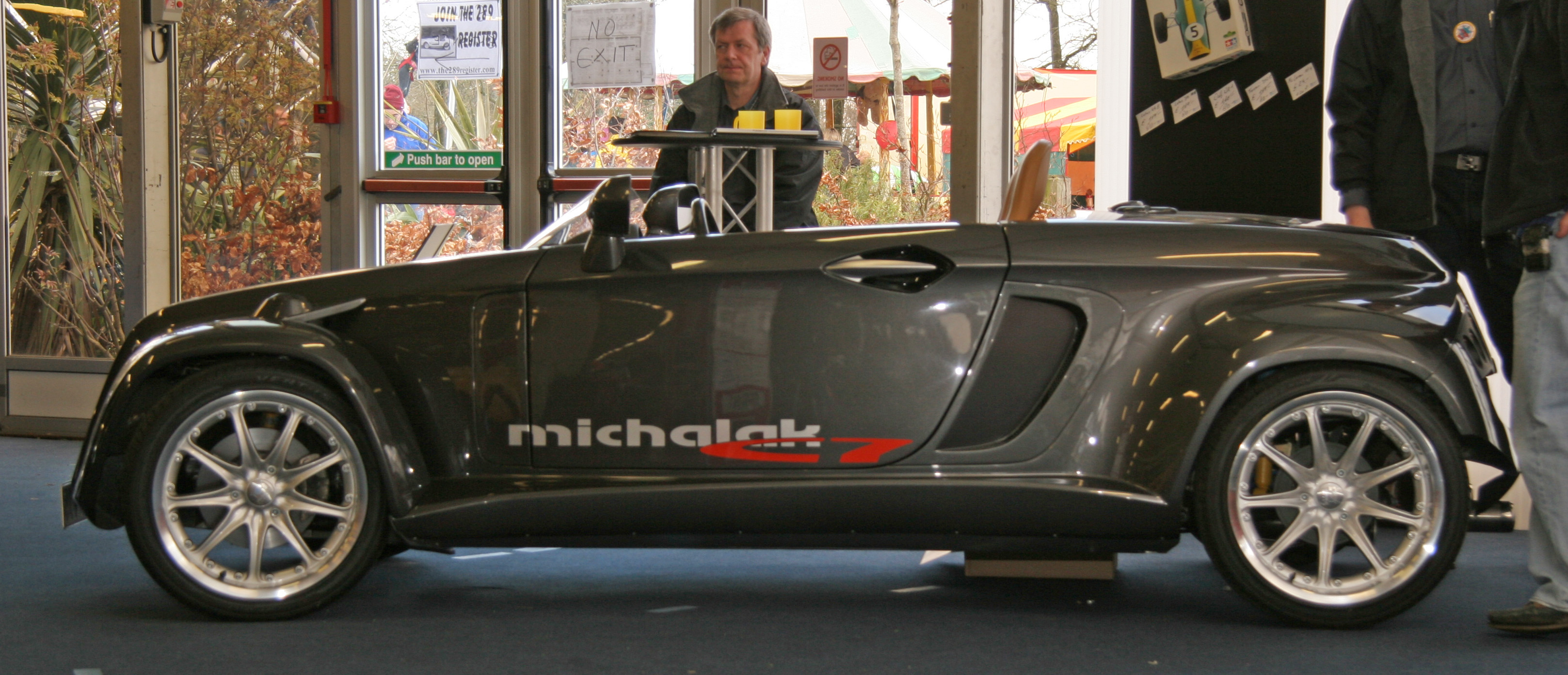
Side view

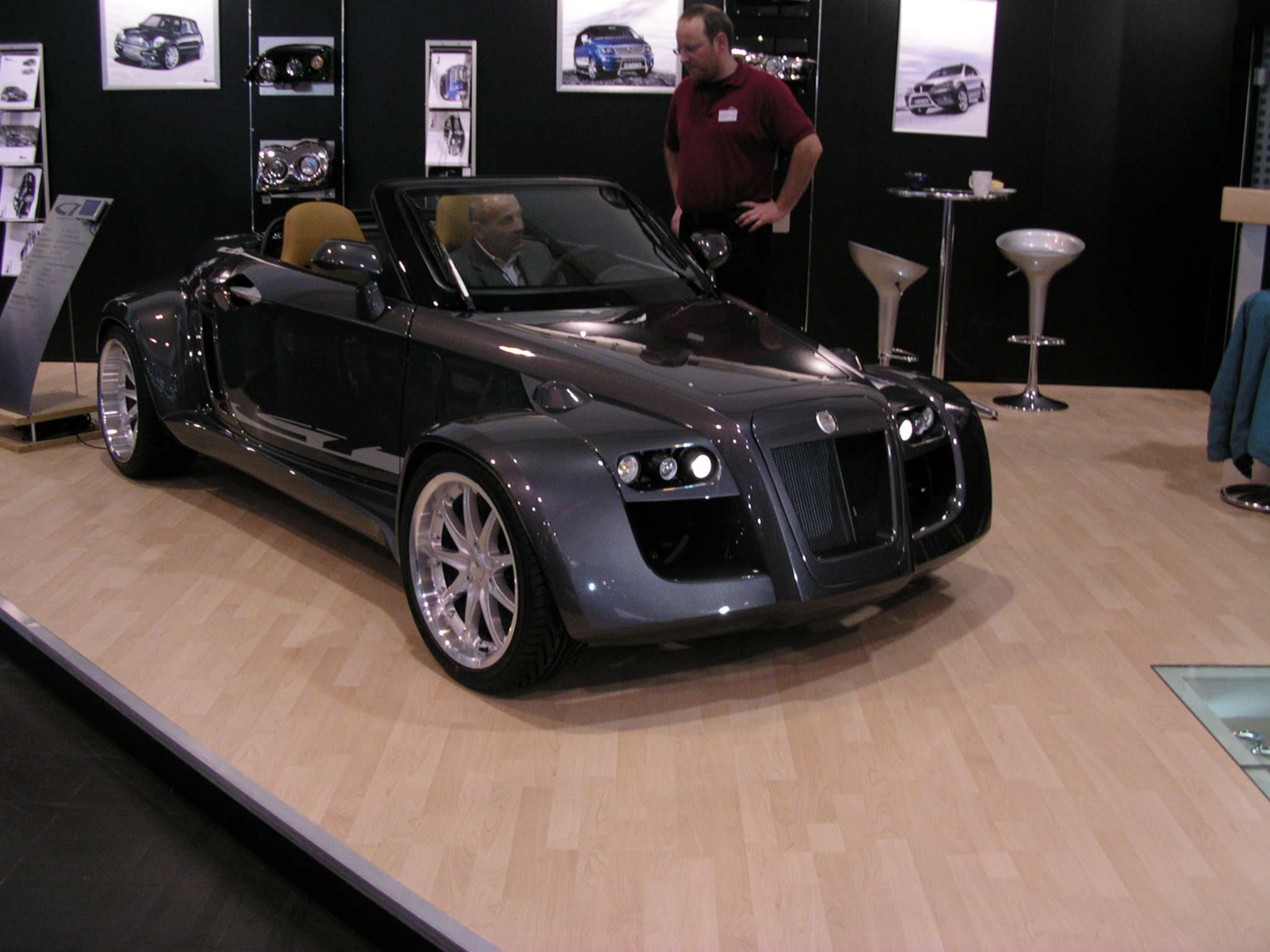
Front 3/4 view

The Michalak C7 is a kit car based on the Smart ForTwo. The C7 uses a stainless, fiber reinforced plastic body making it slightly faster than the Smart ForTwo because it is 170 kg lighter. Once the production version was released, Michalak sold some of the prototypes.
