= Jago (car) =

British kit car manufacturer

Jago Developments Ltd.
- Formerly: Geoff Jago Custom Automotive (1965 - 1979) Jago Automotive (1979 - 1993)
- Company type: Private limited company
- Industry: Automobiles
- Founded: 1965
- Founder: Geoff Jago
- Defunct: 2025
- Fate: Voluntary liquidation
- Headquarters: Chichester
- Products: Jago Geep Jago Samuri

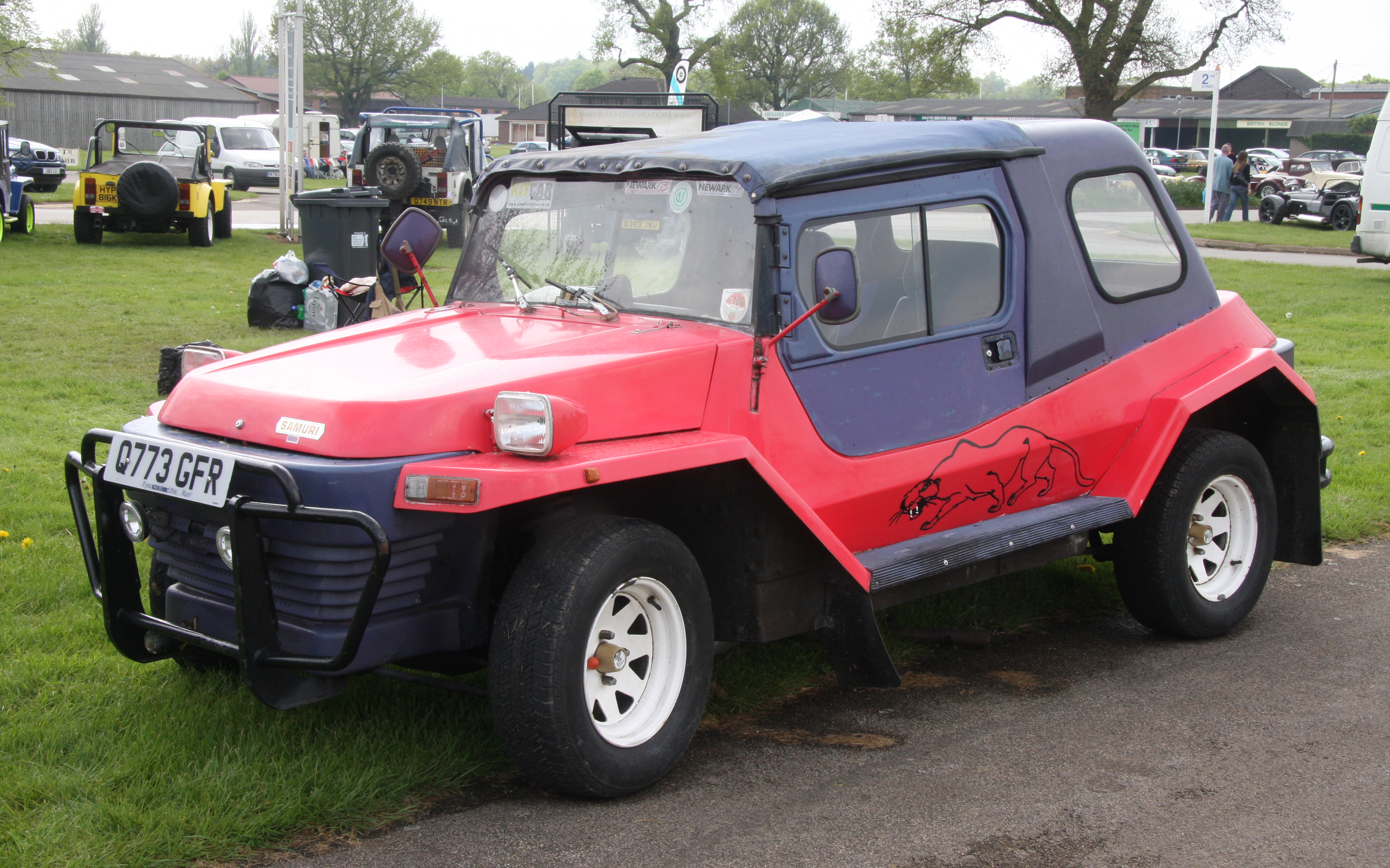
Jago Samuri.

Jago was a British company which used to produce a range of kit cars principally Jeep styled between 1965 and 1997. The company was recorded as being dissolved in January 2025. The company was based in Chichester, West Sussex and now manufactures for a number of industries including, concealment work for councils and telecommunications, theming and the arts.

Geoff Jago founded a company called Geoff Jago Custom Automotive in 1965 making Street Rod type vehicles. In 1971 he made the vehicle for which the company became most famous, the Geep. This used glass fibre panels moulded off an original World War II Willys Jeep and fitted to a chassis with Ford Anglia 105E mechanical parts. An alternative version using Morris Minor parts was added in 1974 and a Ford Escort version in 1976.

The company name was changed to Jago Automotive in 1979 and latterly to Jago Developments Ltd.

The Ford Escort-based Samuri, a four-seat, beach buggy type vehicle costing £795 plus tax for the kit was announced in 1983. Around 100 were made before being taken out of production in 1990.

The Geep name changed to Sandero in 1991 to avoid any copyright issues. The last Sandero kits were made around 1997. As of 2014, the Sandero 4x4 kit was available from Belfield 4x4 Engineering.
