= Sterling Sports Cars =

American automobile kit company

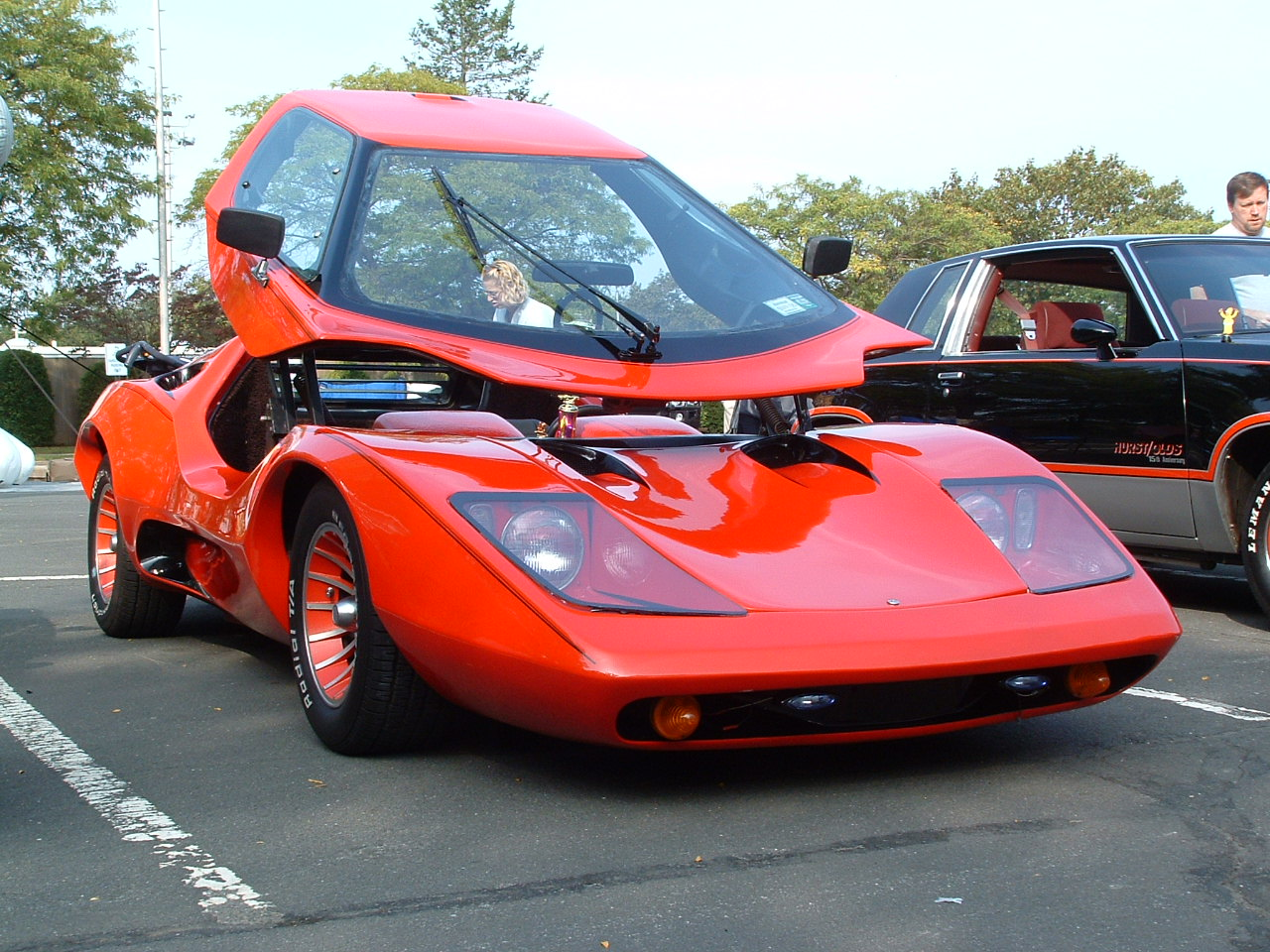
Sterling, based on the UK Nova

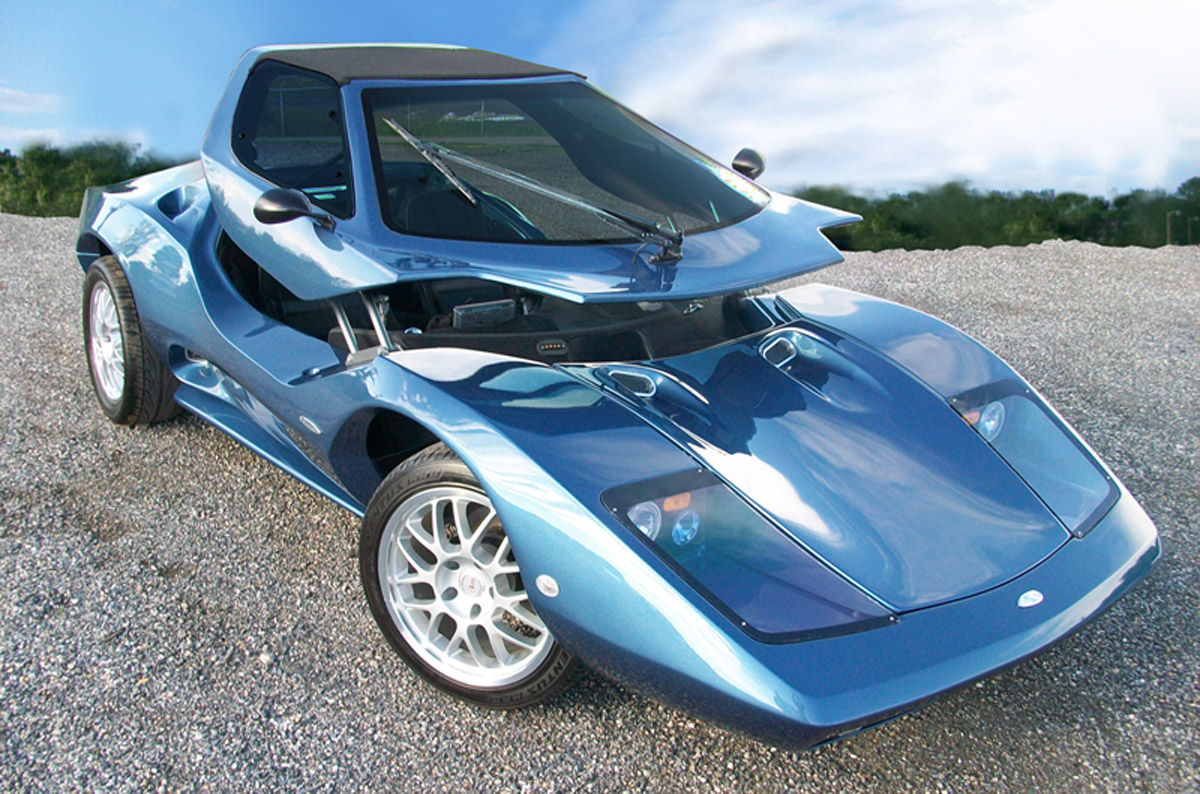
Sterling Sports Cars show car circa 2014

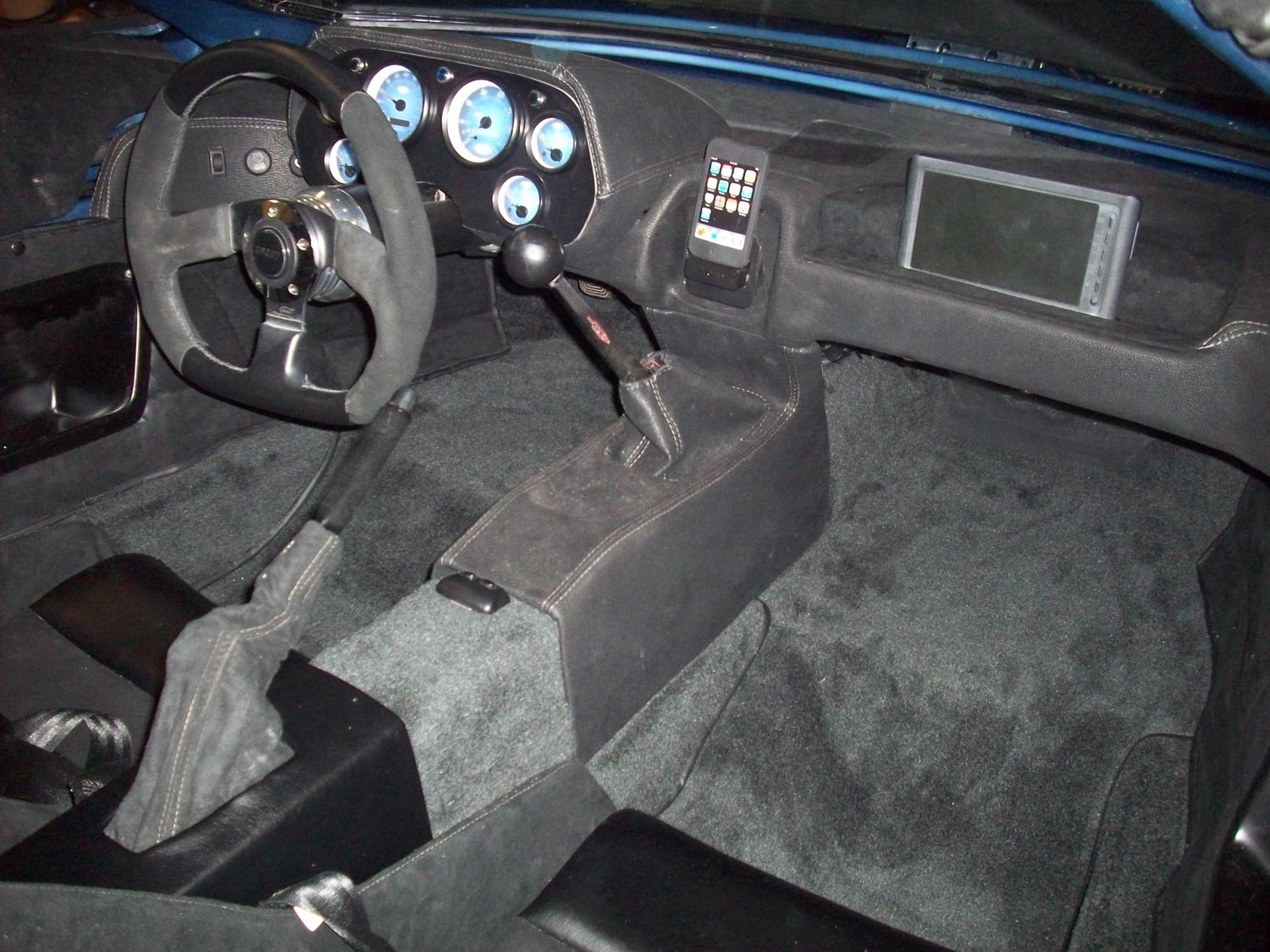
Sterling Sports Cars show car circa 2014

Sterling Sports Cars is an American automobile company that designed and manufactured assembly kits for replicars and supercars. SSC is a continuation of the lineage of the Sterling brand, started in 1972 by California Component Cars from a license from Richard Oakes and Phil Sayers in the UK, marketing their creation called the Nova. The Nova brand was offered under several owners over the years. The Sterling brand under CCC was offered until 1978 when the company filed for bankruptcy. CCC reformed under different ownership until it finally shuttered around 1992. From there, the molds were sold to a company in Washington State called RedHead Roadsters which operated for a year or two, no known cars were produced, then sold again to Solid Sterling around 1996. Solid Sterling produced a handful of cars both as kits and as turn-key. Sometime circa 2005, Solid Sterling closed and sold the molds to an owner in western Pennsylvania who named the company "Sterling Sports Cars". SSC produced a few innovative body modifications while keeping the brand alive. A handful of full kits were produced as well as keeping parts viable for legacy owners. SSC closed their doors in 2015/16 and sold the molds to a single investor in Delaware. That investor sat on the molds for a few years, producing no parts, and eventually sold them yet again in 2019 to a current owner back in Pennsylvania, all under the SSC moniker.

== Current models ==
The "component cars" and parts manufactured by Sterling Sports Cars LLC. were sold as components. The cars were not pre-assembled by Sterling Sports Cars but were intended to be assembled by the purchaser or by a third-party. The Sterling was originally designed to be fitted to a VW Beetle floor pan. A tube frame was engineered as a test mule to find out the capabilities of a mid-engine design using the Subaru powerplant. The engine intruded into the cockpit, making seating space at a premium and no further testing was performed.

The company also sold replacement parts to owners around the world who own an original Sterling car. In the UK, the Sterling was licensed from the Nova kit car. The name Nova was already trademarked by General Motors in the United States in the 1970s, and "Sterling" was chosen as the new name.
