= Spex Design Corporation =

Canadian kit car manufacturer

Spex Design Corporation was a kit car manufacturer based in Montreal, Quebec, Canada. The company was founded by Paul Deutschman (also known for the T-Rex, Porsche Spexter and Callaway cars like the C7 Corvette and CS Camaro) and Kell Warshaw in 1982. The company made a kit called Spex Elf that was somewhere between a body kit and a kit car based on the first-generation (1973–1979) Honda Civic. By cutting off the roof and side panels and adding a steel subframe and fibreglass body, it allowed a quite easy conversion of a Honda Civic into a roadster. The kit used many parts from the donor Civic, but the front light came from the Honda Accord, and the rear light from Mercury Capri. The company made about 20 kits before selling the molds.

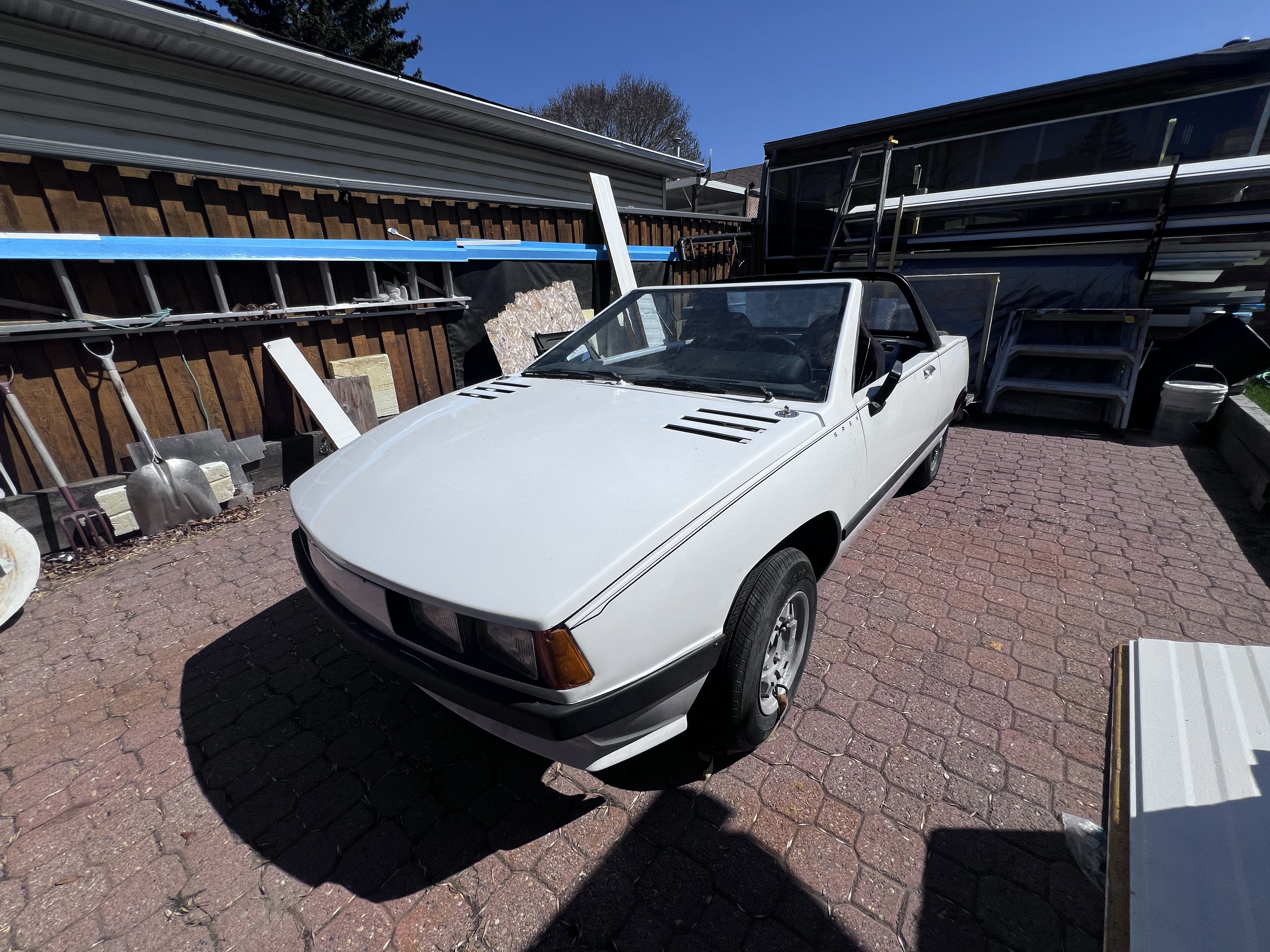
Honda civic based Spex elf kit car

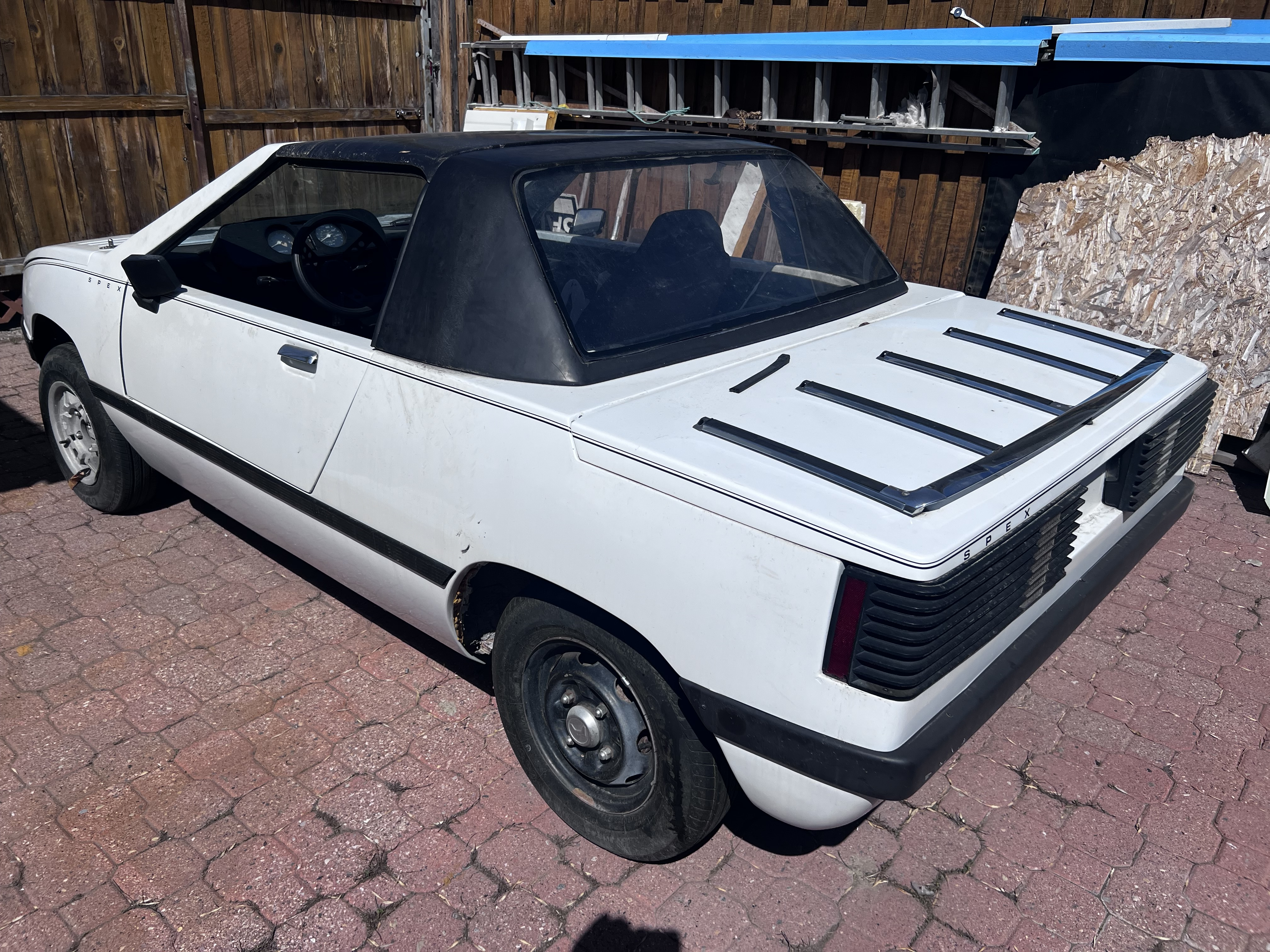
Honda civic based Spex elf kit car rear
