= Beattie (automobile) =

Beattie was originally a New Zealand kitcar created by Stephen Charles Beattie and its manufacture moved to the United Kingdom 2009. It ceased trading in 2017.

== Stephen Beattie ==
Born in Hastings the late 1940's, Beattie has been interested in car design since seeing a Lotus 11 in his youth at the Levin motor races. The sleekness of the design made such an impression on Beattie that it became an influence in his cars, particularly the Beattie SR2000 and Clubman Sports.

== Lola based models ==
Beattie made the Beattie SR2000 and Clubman Sports, based on the Lola-Climax Mk1. Kevin Hunt of Redline Performance Cars Limited acquired the design from Stephen Beattie in 1999 and the car was renamed the Redline Sprint with a least two models being available, the Sprint and the Road Sport. It was available up to at least 2007.

Redline Performance Cars Limited changed its name in February 2007 to KGH Enterprises Limited and ceased trading in November 2009. Hunt became a shareholder in Hulme Supercars Limited later in 2009.

In 2007 Redline Racing Ltd, with Christophe Christianson as Director, was formed and acquired the rights for the Redline Clubman Sprint/RoadSport. The company relocated to the United Kingdom in 2009, becoming Beattie Racing Limited, and initially set up manufacturing facilities in Frome. In 2012 it relocated to larger manufacturing facilities at Newton Abbot, South Devon. There they made two models, the Beattie LM (Le Mans) and the Beattie RS (Road Sport). The company ceased trading on 25 April 2017.

Christianson returned to New Zealand and is setting up the Beattie Worx facility in the Bay of Islands. The Beattie LM is to be built there and he is developing a new Beattie Roadster. The cars are expected to cost between NZ$100,000 and NZ$200,000.

== Beattie Paolo ==
Stephen Beattie, in the interim, designed and built the Paolo. It is a mid-engined sports car of similar style to a 1980 Can-am car. The car is powered by a highly modified 1,712cc Alfa Romeo engine. It has an aluminium and fibre glass body on a complex tubular chassis.
