= Mania Spyder =

The Mania Spyder was a Swedish kit car company in Falköping selling a sports roadster based on either VW Beetle or spaceframe chassis. They advertised that a formula spaceframe made for motorcycle engines would be available in spring 2001. It was designed by the automotive designer and guitar builder Ulf Bolumlid of Design by Ulf. Over 50 examples of the Mania have been sold, a Swedish record for an own design kit-car.
