= Onyx Sports Cars =

British kit car manufacturer

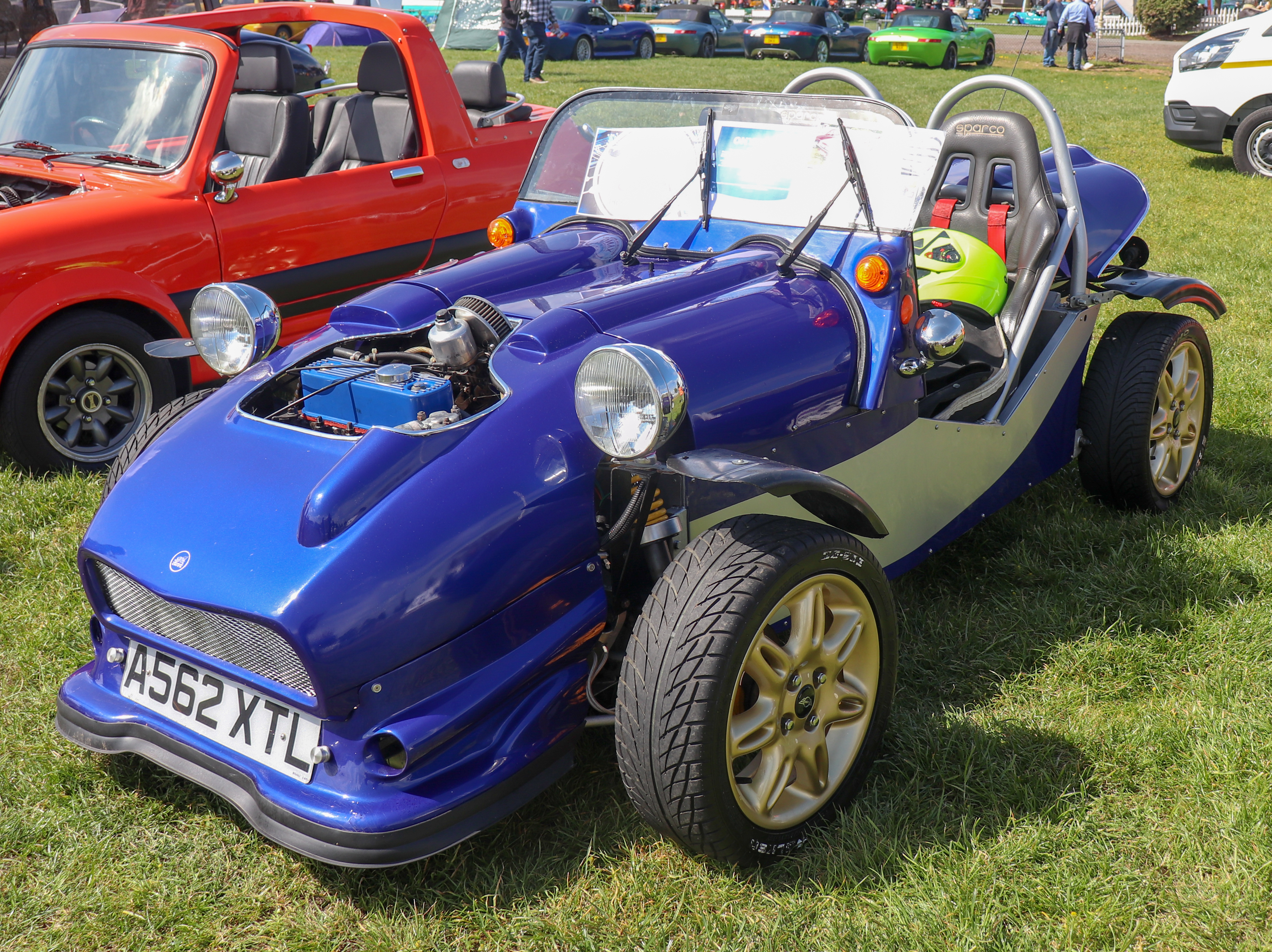
Onyx Bobcat 1.3

Onyx Sports Cars Ltd is a UK kit car manufacturer. They produce the Onyx Mongoose, a mid-engined machine made for the Rover K engine from a Rover Metro or Rover 200 Series, and the Onyx Firefox, a two seated open sports car made using the Rover K engine in front wheel drive position. The Onyx Firecat was introduced in 1995 and was designed by David Golightly. It used Fiat Uno parts and was front wheel drive. It also had the option of using the Fiat Uno Turbo engine. During its five-year production run about 100 were sold.

Their first car was the 1993 Onyx Firefly which was based on the Fiat Panda. Since 2005 the Firefly has been produced by Alphax Kitcars and has been reintroduced to the British and European market as the Alphax Firefly.
