= Mascot (car) =

Mascot was a car made by AB Rååverken in Helsingborg around 1920.

Sold both as a kit car and in finished form it was a way of converting a motor cycle to a type of cyclecar. Usually based on an Excelsior two cylinder 16 HP motorcycle (optionally a Harley-Davidson, Reading Standard or Indian) the steering, seat and front wheel were removed and the motorcycle frame was attached to a low weight body that added the "missing" three wheels. The track width was 1,070 mm (42.1 in), length about 3 m (118 in) and weight 275 kg (606 lb). It was steered via a steering wheel, had pedals for throttle and brakes and a gear stick and was fitted with windscreen, doors, soft top, comfortable seats and a single front light. It seated two persons in tandem.
