= La Dawri =

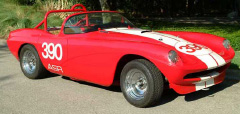
La Dawri Daytona

La Dawri Coachcraft was founded by Leslie Albert Dawes in British Columbia, Canada in 1956 and is credited with making Canada's first fibreglass car, the La Dawri Cavalier. The company moved to the United States in 1957 where it became one of the largest fiberglass sports car body companies during the rebody/specials craze of the 1950s and 1960s. The company ceased operations in 1965. Its name came from a combination of L A Dawes and his friend Don Wright. Dawes was born on 7 July 1933 and died in 2002.

== The beginnings ==
Les Dawes began a small fiberglass manufacturing business in the early to mid fifties. Dawes made fiberglass body shells for McCulloch golf carts. During his spare time, Les designed a fiberglass bodied sports car, from an idea he is said to have had in the late 1940s. This car became the Cavalier.

== Cavalier (Conquest) and Quest ==
The Cavalier model was first shown at the Pacific National Exhibition in Vancouver in 1956. Dawes intention was to sell the car in both Canada and the United States. In 1957 the company moved to Long Beach and later Los Alamitos, California. The Cavalier, renamed Conquest, was featured on the cover of Road & Track magazine in July 1957. The Conquest and the later Daytona were among the most popular models offered with a wheelbase of 100 inches. The Conquest was a two-seat open roadster and was followed in 1958 by the Quest, a smaller version to fit smaller chassis.

== Daytona and Sebring ==
The 1958 Daytona and the smaller Sebring were similar to the Conquest/Quest but with a single grill opening and front end styling. All the LaDawri roadster models had optional removal hardtops. A hardtop mold for the Conquest and Daytona models was being constructed with production scheduled for Fall 2008 available through LaDawri.com, but this did not proceed.

== Victress Manufacturing Company ==
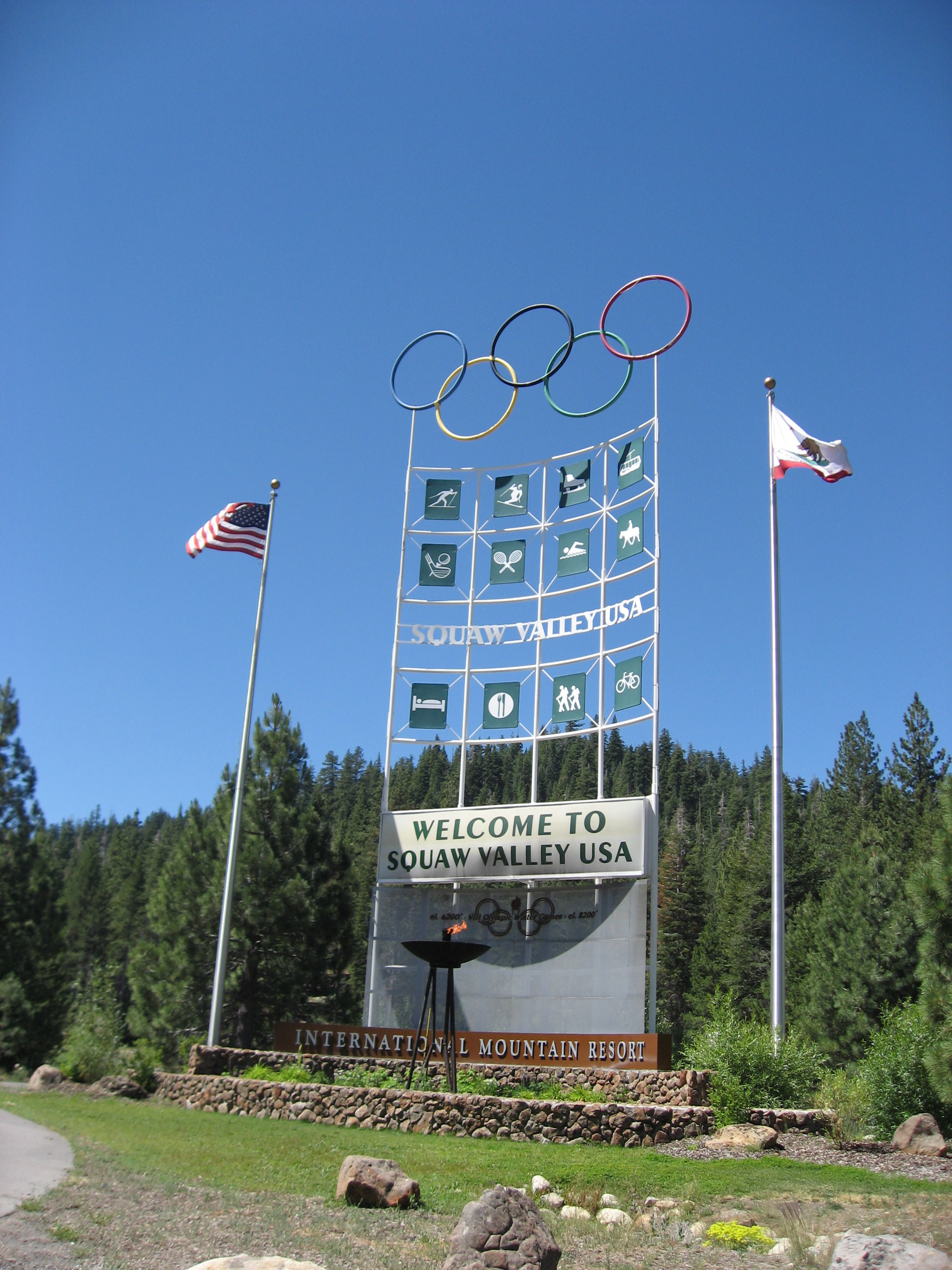
Squaw Valley Winter Olympics sign

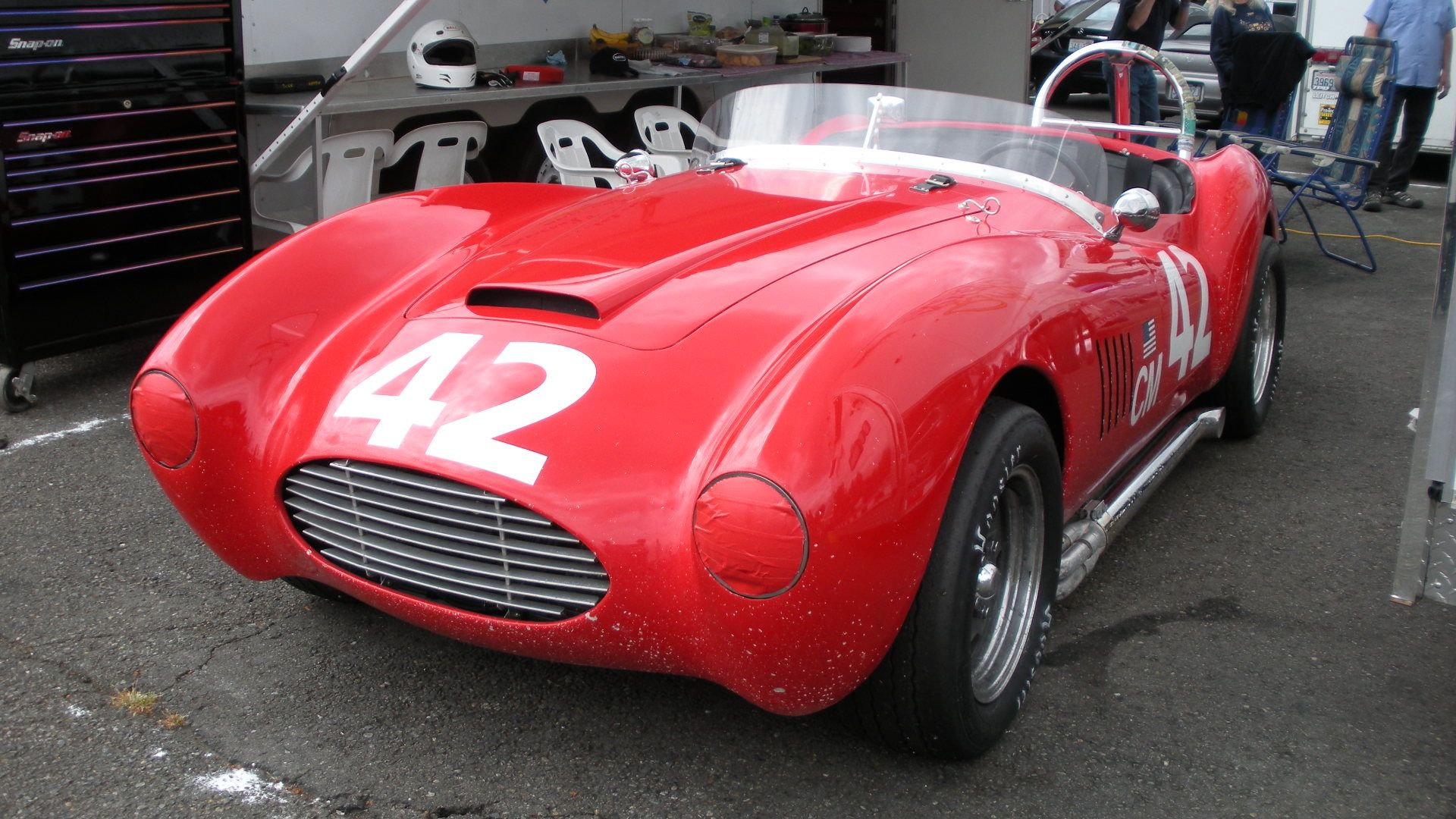
1954 Victress

The Victress Manufacturing Company was founded in California in 1952. Its first model, the S1A was designed by Hugh Jorgensen, a Los Angeles Art Centre graduate, and William "Doc" Boyce-Smith in either 1951 or 1952. Jorgenson also designed the S4. The S1A was fitted on a variety of chassis. However those from the factory were built on either a Ford or a custom chassis from Mameco Corp. They usually had small-block Chevrolet engines. The S1A featured in the 1954 movie Johnny Dark which starred Tony Curtis and Piper Laurie.

In 1954 Merrill Powell acquired 49 percent of Victress and joined the company. A design student, Powell, designed the C2 and C3. The C2 came out in 1954 and the C3 in 1955. Fewer than 40 Victress coupes were made and sold in the 1950s, but the other models did well. A style that had its origin in the 'Merrill Powell' designed Model C2 Coupe (first introduced in 1954), the C2 rear and tail design became the genesis for the GM's 'Cadet XP-79' (Brock design) concept Micro Car and the 'Q-Corvette' then the XP700 and later the 1961 Corvette (attributed to Bob McLean/Pete Brock) as well as the later 1963 Corvette StingRay. Merrill Powell was a co-owner of the Victress Car Company along with Boyce-Smith, while the sole Victress car distributor was Hellings Co of Vanowen St, North Hollywood.

Only a couple of the original C2 Coupes are known to exist but a newly restored C2 was at the Monterey Motorsports Reunion (Historics) held at Laguna Seca RaceWay in 2017.

In 1958 Victress was approached by George Lippincott Sr. of the Nic-L-Silver battery company to create a fiberglass body for a battery-powered sports car. Lippincott wanted Victress to create a body using existing Victress body parts, with some subtle changes. Hugh Jorgensen, took charge of the body design which was based around the S4. Named the Pioneer, the car debuted at the 1959 Los Angeles County fair.

By 1961 Victress had too much government contract work to be able to concentrate on car bodies. They were also contracted to make the Olympic rings for the Squaw Valley Winter Olympics. Its molds were sold to Les Dawes (LaDawri) who rebadged the Victress as LaDawri and renamed the models.

LaDawri re-engineered the bodies adding doors, door jams and liners. Between 120 and 150 Castilian and Sicilian coupes were sold by them. The 'Merrill Powell' design was years ahead of its time and copied by a number of European car manufacturers into the '60's as well as General Motors and the Corvette.

Victress Model	LaDawri Model	Purpose	Type	Wheelbase	Produced by LaDawri	Comments
C2	Sicilian	Sports car	Coupe	90-98 inches	1961–1965	Back Seat
C3	Castilian	Sports car	Coupe	98-102 inches	1961–1965	Back Seat
S1A	Vixen	Competition car	Roadster	98-102	1961–1965	
S4	Cavalier	Sports Car	Convertible	108-120	1961–1965	
S5	Cheetah	Competition car	Roadster	92-96	1961–1965	
	Castilian	Sports	Station Wagon	98-108	1965	
Dragster	Formula JR	Dragster			1961–1965	
T-body	T-lightful	Roadster			1961–1965	

One Victress S4, believed to still be in existence, was used by Charles F Keen for his 1963 Keen Steamliner. In 1956 Keen had used Abner Doble as a consultant in the development of the car's steam engine. Only one of these is thought to exist. In the 1940s Keen had assembled a Stanley steam engine powered car on what is believed to be a Plymouth chassis with a Chevrolet body. That car was in England under restoration in the late 2000s.

== Jim Savage ==
In 1957 or 1958 Jim Savage and his father constructed a fibreglass car as part of his portfolio to be accepted at Art Center College of Design. An unknown, but probably small, number of these cars were made before the mold was sold to LaDawri in 1962. LaDawri renamed the car the Centurion 21 and production continued until 1965.

== Formula Libre ==
The last body La Dawri introduced was the 1965 Formula Libre, with a front or mid-engined layout. LaDawri offered to adapt it to take any running gear that the customer chose. At least two bodies were laid up for PBS racing. One of the cars is rumored to have been shipped to Japan. After the company closed, Les used the Formula Libre molds to build one prototype called the Vendetta. He built the car on a VW chassis for production in Canada. On a trip back from Canada the car was destroyed and Les was injured when a semi-truck driver fell asleep at the wheel and ran over the towed car.

== Demise ==
The reason for the company's demise has not been determined. There was speculation that it was either a fire that destroyed all the molds or the IRS chasing tax. Certainly, by the mid-1960s, competition from muscle cars made times difficult for the kit car manufacturers. After the company folded Les Dawes worked for a big aircraft firm, designing escape hatches for planes. In the 1980s he returned to manufacturing with a tent trailer for the back of a pickup truck. According to his wife it was hard to market.

Because of the number of these cars built and still in existence there is still demand for parts and there is an owners' website. The 50th anniversary of the LaDawri Conquest was celebrated in March 2007 at the Amelia Island Concours d'Elegance, with members of the Dawes family attending.
