= Racing Plast Burträsk =

Swedish company

Racing Plast Burträsk (RPB) was a Swedish company in Burträsk that made racing cars and kit cars. It was founded in 1965 by Kjell Lindskog.

== Formula Vee cars ==
Starting in 1966 the company produced two Formula Vee cars, Broke that was a copy of the American Beach Car and Dolling FVe that was a design by Willy Dolling. The Dolling was made in three versions between 1966 and 1967, in total 52 cars were built. In 1967 RPB started making their own Formula Vee car. It was simple to make and inexpensive. It sold well and did well in races. In 1968 the chassis was improved to make it more rigid and give it a more adjustable rear axle design. In 1969 the car was redesigned again, this time to increase performance, but only six were made due to rumours about changes in the Formula Vee rules. In 1970 the new rules came and they allowed a more wedge like shape and a longer and narrower car. 13-15 cars were made. The RPB cars were very successful and they won 14 out of 18 competitions. One of them was still winning races in 1978. The same model continued to be built in 1971 and 1972, but only in small numbers. In 1971 RPB cars made 22 European track records. In 1971 a Formula Super Vee car was made. This time using a monocoque chassis. The prototype car did well in races, but was plagued with engine problems and the rear end of the chassis had to be redesigned. After the redesign it worked better and the driver Bror Jaktlund managed to finished as number 3 in the European championship, even if a crash forced him to skip the last race. A second Super Formula Vee car was made in 1973 and was in use until it was sold in 1976. It then changed hands several times to owners in Sweden, Denmark and England until it came back to Sweden in late 2002.

== Sports cars ==
In 1968 the RPB Piraya was introduced. It was a low, two seated kit car with gullwing-doors inspired by the Ford GT40 and made for a Volkswagen Beetle chassis. It sold 40 kits in less than a year, but some customers found it difficult to assemble the cars. In 1969 the RPB-GT was introduced. Prices started at 3800 SEK. The design was similar to the Piraya, but had normal front hinged doors. The kit was made easier to assemble for the customer. The GT sold well, most as kits, but some as completed cars. It used a fuel tank from Renault 10, hinges to the front and rear hood came from Renault 4, door handles and locks from Renault 16, door hinges and side windows (cut to size) from the Mini, the front screen from a 1967 Chevrolet Corvette, rear and front lights were Hella universal (although the same headlight units was also used in Saab 96, Saab 99 and Renault 16).

In 1970 the new laws for homebuilt street cars was changed and required a mandatory crash test making kit cars virtually impossible to get street legal. Production for export, mostly to Finland and Norway, continued for a while. In May 1971 a fire destroyed the factory and the molds and it was not possible to restart production. The dealer in Finland had orders for more cars so he bought the rights to the RPB GT and made new molds from one of the delivered cars, but with desedigned rear and a 5 cm higher roof, and continued production for some years. RPB withdrew from car making and instead produced other plastic products such as bus interiors and snowmobile parts. In 1982 the law for amateur built cars changed so home built cars again could be made road legal. RPB decided to restart production with an updated model of the GT model. Some cars were built and showed on various exhibitions. They were well received both by media and public. But then RPB got a large order for plastic products for the Swedish military and the car production plans were put on hold. The Finnish mold was sold after some 20 cars were made and later changed hand several times. The last known owner was Allan Sjöbacka in Vaasa and he tried to sell them.
