= GCS Cars =

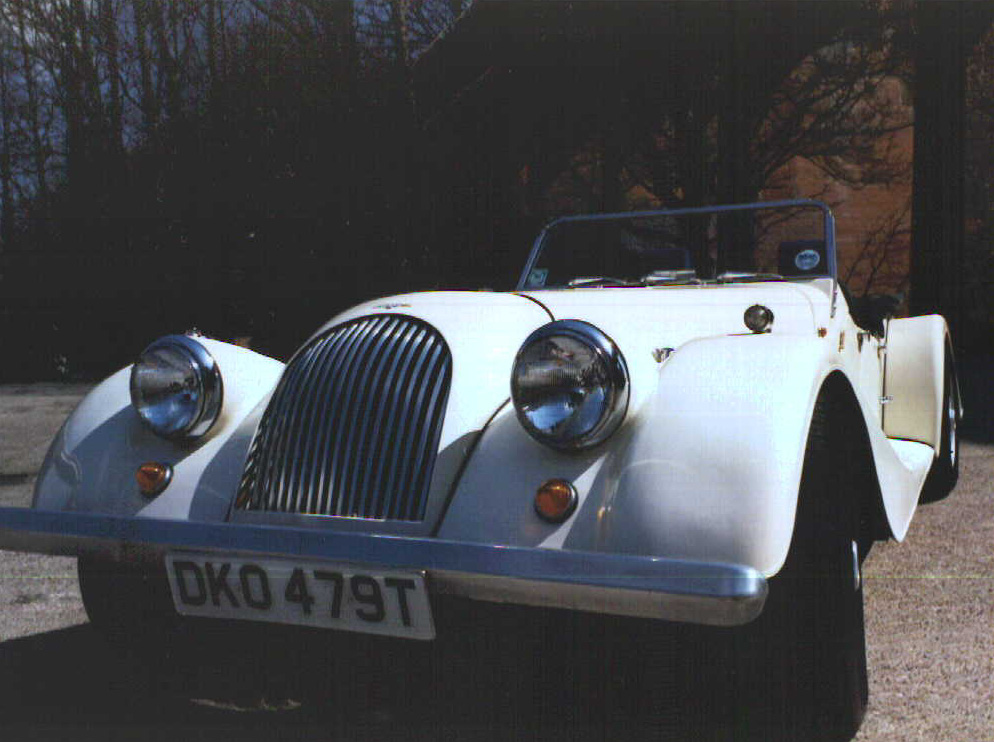
GCS Hawke

GCS (Gary Colin Specialist) Cars traded initially from Orpington in Kent, UK and produced the Hawke. Although similar to the Burlington SS in some respects, the GCS Hawke was developed completely independently by the partners in GCS Cars with considerably different dimensions overall. The Dorian/Burlington was designed to fit on a Triumph chassis, although Dorian later developed a chassis that it is believed was using Escort parts. The GCS Hawke was designed to fit on a ladder-frame chassis to accept Cortina/Sierra parts. This led to the bodyshell and wings being considerably wider than the original Dorian/Burlington car. It is an open two seater modelled fairly closely, but differently enough, on the Morgan. Whereas the Burlington body tub was constructed of glass-fibre, wood and aluminium, the Hawke has a one-piece GRP bodyshell with integral floor. It can take a variety of engines from Ford and the V8 Rover. The company was founded by Garry Hutton and Collin Puttock.

The company was eventually sold to Tiger Racing but then sold to LCD (LC Developments Ltd founded in 2003 by Richard John Laking and Paul John Chapman) who currently both manufacture the car and supply the car as a kit.
