= Dax Cars =

British sports car manufacturer

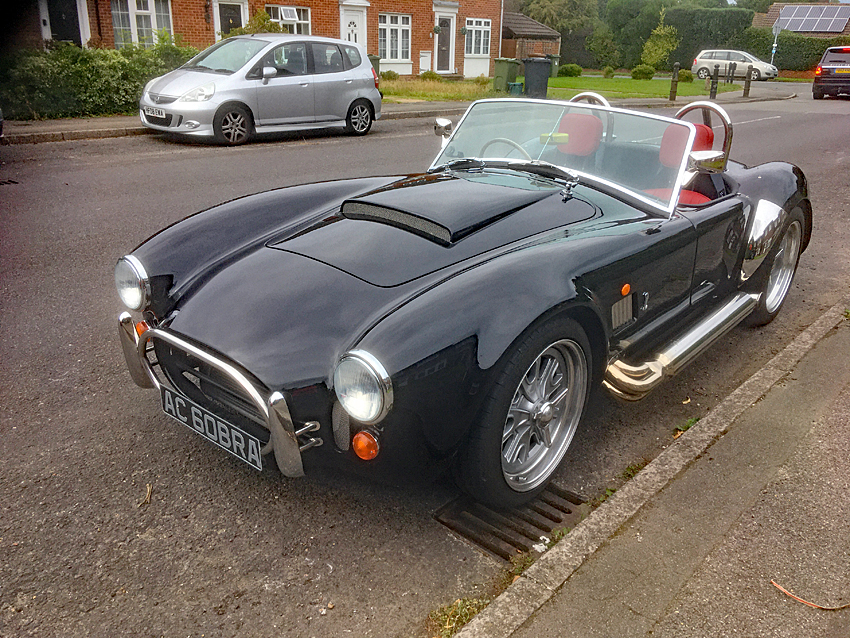
- Dax 427
- Type: British Sportscar Manufacturer
- Industry: Automobiles
- Founded: 1968
- Founder: Derek Johns
- Headquarters: North Weald, Essex, England, United Kingdom
- Products: Dax 427
- Owner: John Kox
- Website: Official site

Dax Cars is a British sports car manufacturer founded in 1968 and based in North Weald, Essex, England.

Dax started as a fibreglass moulding company, named DJ Sportscars Int. and became first British company to make a kit based replica of the AC 427 Cobra. On 15 August 2017, John Kox acquired the production of the Dax 427 from 427 Motor Company (formerly known as Dax Cars & DJ Sportscars Int.).

== Tojeiro / 427 ==
In 1975 John Tojeiro, the original designer of the AC Ace chassis became a director of the company and the car was renamed the Dax Tojeiro. The Tojeiro has undergone continuous development and now called Dax 427. In 2003 the 427 De Dion became available, beside the 427 IRS, with a choice to accommodate most American V8 and Jaguar engines including the V12. Automatic or manual transmission can be used and power steering is another option. A leather trimmed interior kit.

== Kamala ==
Launched in 1996 and designed by ex Ford designer Peter Walker, the Kamala was a radical looking original super car utilising the Cosworth 2 litre turbo engine giving a 0-60 time of 3.5 seconds..

== Californian ==
Launched in 1985, the Californian was a Porsche 356 lookalike with VW Beetle components.

== Nevada ==
The Nevada was an off-roader type vehicle using a space frame tubular chassis and VW Beetle engine announced in 1985.

== Coupe ==
The Coupe made an appearance at the Stoneleigh show in 2018. While the Coupe is a new model, it’s based on the old underpinnings of the established Dax 427. The Dax Coupe chassis is lengthened by 5in, that extra length being made from a new spaceframe section. Suspension is carried over and the engine options remain the same as on the E27. Dax also made the Rush, 2 seat sports car. With many engine variations from V8, to 2.0 ltr straight 4 cylinder with turbo, and motorcycle engines, commonly using the Suzuki Hayabusa engine. There was also a x1 off chassis with a helicopter turbine engine! Not road legal of course.
