= Velo Rossa =

The Velo Rossa is a fibre reinforced plastic composite (usually fiberglass) automobile body built by Reaction Research (a.k.a. ZTrix.com and formerly known as VR Engineering) in Scottsdale, Arizona, USA. It is designed to re-style the body of the 1970-1978 Datsun/Nissan S30 Z series cars. Front end appearance panels (hood, fenders) are replaced. Doors and rear external components (which are part of the unitized body/frame of the Datsun) are over-skinned after trimming out the wheel wells for wider tires.

Velo Rossa Spyder, front view.

== Ferrari GTO Replicas ==
Velo Rossa Spyder, rear view

While not a replica per se, the Velo Rossa is very similar to several Ferrari 250 GTO replica designs which preceded it, including the

- Eagle GTO by Merlin Coffano (a.k.a. Barry Goldstein; sold to Joe Alphabet)
- Alpha One GTO by Joe Alphabet (molds now owned by ZTrix.com in Scottsdale, AZ)
- McBurnie GTO replicas by Tom McBurnie of McBurnie Coachcraft (sold to Carrera Coachwerks, San Diego, CA, now defunct)
- Blu-ray Rhino GT by Jim Simpson of Simpson Design, sold to Scorpion Z-Cars
- Scorpion GTZ, sold to UK-based OM Sports Cars (now defunct)
- Puckett 250GTO by former McBurnie associate Charlie Puckett (now defunct)
- Classic Revival, NSW, Australia

Of these manufacturers only Reaction Research (dba ZTrix) is still producing kits and parts for this style of rebody for the Nissan S30.

== Velo Rossa Differences ==
The Velo Rossa differs from previous designs by offering a one-piece, tilt-up front bonnet, with "cheek panels" on the sides; and the ability to be built as either a coupe; or as a Velo Rossa Spyder roadster with a trunk and trunk lid.

== Ferrari Rebodies ==
The Ferrari 250 GTO was only offered as a coupe, though other Ferrari models were occasionally rebodied into roadsters that looked like the GTO. These included the "Nembo" cars by Italian coachbuilders Neri & Bonacini (under direction of American Tom Meade), and a one-off by American car restorer Mark Goyette for ZZ Top drummer Frank Beard (musician). Goyette also built the Ferrari 250 GT Spyder California SWB replica for the American movie "Ferris Bueller's Day Off," which continues in production as the CalSpyderII.

There are also a few examples of highly sophisticated tube-chassis 250 GTO replicas, including a very nice one by the Australian team of Tim Foate, Gavin Tindell and Dale Stevens with a Ferrari 330GT engine.

== Performance Modifications ==
Any performance modifications available for the Nissan S30 cars can be applied to the Velo Rossa. These include brake and suspension upgrades, larger wheels and tires, and engine swaps. Chevrolet small-block engine swaps, including the LS-series, are common. More extreme engine swaps have included Jaguar V-12 engines, and a BMW V-12.
