= Triumph Herald =

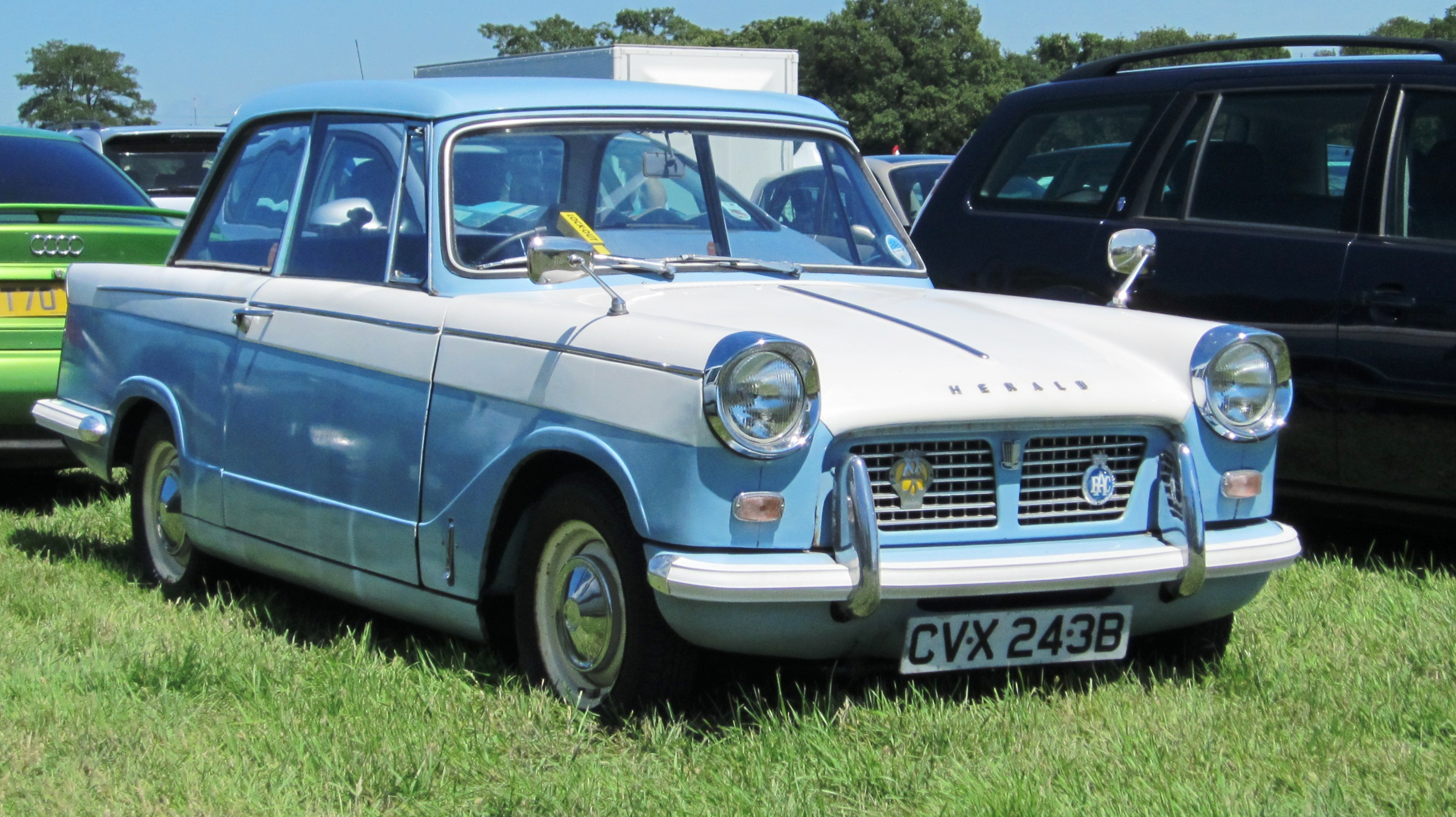
- 1964 Triumph Herald 1200 Saloon

Overview
- Manufacturer: Standard-Triumph (1959–1968); British Leyland (1968–1971)
- Also called: Triumph 12/50; Triumph 1200; Triumph Courier; Standard Herald (India)
- Production: 1959–1971
- Assembly: United Kingdom: Canley, Coventry; Australia: Port Melbourne (AMI); Belgium: Mechelen; India: Madras (Standard); Ireland: Dublin; Italy: Borgo Panigale, Bologna (Ducati); Malta: Marsa (Car Assembly Ltd.); New Zealand: Christchurch; New Zealand: Nelson (NZMC); Peru: Lima; Philippines: Manila; South Africa: Durban (Motor Assemblies)
- Designer: Giovanni Michelotti

Body and chassis
- Class: Small family car
- Body style: 2-door saloon; 2-door coupé; 2-door convertible; 3-door estate car; 3-door van (Courier)
- Layout: FR layout
- Related: Triumph Vitesse; Triumph Spitfire; Triumph GT6

Powertrain
- Engine: 948 cc OHV I4; 1147 cc OHV I4 (Herald 1200 & 12/50); 1296 cc OHV I4 (13/60)
- Transmission: 4-speed manual (synchromesh on 2nd 3rd and top gears, no overdrive)

Dimensions
- Wheelbase: 91 in (2,311 mm)
- Length: 153 in (3,886 mm)
- Width: 60 in (1,524 mm)
- Height: 52 in (1,321 mm)
- Kerb weight: 725 kg (1,598 lb) (1200 convertible) to 865 kg (1,907 lb) (13/60 estate)

Chronology
- Predecessor: Standard Eight / Standard Ten
- Successor: Triumph 1300

The Triumph Herald is a small two-door car introduced by Standard-Triumph of Coventry in 1959 and made through to 1971. The body design was by the Italian stylist Giovanni Michelotti, and the car was offered in saloon, convertible, coupé, estate and van models, with the latter marketed as the Triumph Courier.

Total Herald sales numbered well over half a million. The Triumph Vitesse, Spitfire and GT6 models are all based on modified Herald chassis and running gear with bolt-together bodies.

== Herald & Herald S (948 cc) ==
Towards the end of the 1950s Standard-Triumph offered a range of two-seater Triumph sports cars alongside its Standard saloons, the Standard Eight and Standard Ten, powered by a small (803 cc or 948 cc) 4-cylinder engine, which by the late 1950s were due for an update. Standard-Triumph therefore started work on the Herald. The choice of the Herald name suggests that the car was originally intended to be marketed as a Standard, as it fits the model-naming scheme of the time (Ensign, Pennant and Standard itself). But by 1959 it was felt that the Triumph name had more brand equity, and the Standard name was phased out in Britain after 1963.

Giovanni Michelotti was commissioned to style the car by the Standard-Triumph board, encouraged by chief engineer Harry Webster, and quickly produced designs for a two-door saloon with a large glass area that gave 93 per cent all-round visibility in the saloon variant and the "razor-edge" looks to which many makers were turning. As Fisher & Ludlow, Standard-Triumph's body suppliers became part of an uncooperative British Motor Corporation, it was decided that the car should have a separate chassis rather than adopting the newer unitary construction. The main body tub was bolted to the chassis and the whole front end hinged forward to allow access to the engine. Every panel – including the sills and roof – could be unbolted from the car so that different body styles could be easily built on the same chassis. As an addition to the original coupé and saloon models, a convertible was introduced in 1960.

The Standard Pennant's 4-cylinder 948 cc OHV Standard SC engine and 4 speed manual gearbox was used with synchromesh on the top three gears and remote gear shift and driving the rear wheels. Most of the engine parts were previously used in the Standard 8/10. The rack and pinion steering afforded the Herald a tight 25-foot (7.6 m) turning circle. At the front coil and double-wishbone front suspension was fitted which was in time directly copied by such as Lotus, the Bill Thomas Cheetah and Reliant. The rear suspension, in a new departure for Triumph, offered "limited" independent springing via a single transverse leaf-spring bolted to the top of the final drive unit and swing axles.

Instruments were confined to a single large speedometer with fuel gauge in the saloon (a temperature gauge was available as an option) on a dashboard of grey pressed fibreboard. The coupé dashboard was equipped with speedometer, fuel and temperature gauges, together with a lockable glovebox. The car had loop-pile carpeting and heater as standard. A number of extras were available including twin SU carburettors, leather seats, a wood-veneered dashboard, Telaflo shock absorbers and paint options.

In late 1958, prototype cars embarked on a test run from Cape Town to Tangiers. An account of the journey was embellished by PR at the time. However, only minor changes were deemed necessary between the prototype and production cars. The new car was launched at the Royal Albert Hall in London on 22 April 1959 but was not an immediate sales success, partly owing to its relatively high cost, approaching £700 (including 45 per cent Purchase Tax). In standard single-carburettor form the 34.5 bhp (26 kW) car was no better than average in terms of performance. A saloon tested by The Motor magazine in 1959 was found to have a top speed of 70.9 mph (114.1 km/h) and could accelerate from 0–60 mph (97 km/h) in 31.1 seconds. A fuel consumption of 34.5 miles per imperial gallon (8.2 L/100 km; 28.7 mpg_{‑US}) was recorded.

The rear suspension was criticised as yielding poor handling at the extremes of performance though the model was considered easy to drive with its good vision, light steering (smallest turning circle of any production car) and controls, and ease of repair.

A Herald S variant was introduced in 1961 with a lower equipment level and less chrome than the Herald. It was offered in saloon form only.

The 948 cc Herald Coupé and Convertible models were discontinued in 1961, the 948 cc Herald Saloon in 1962 and the Herald S in 1964.

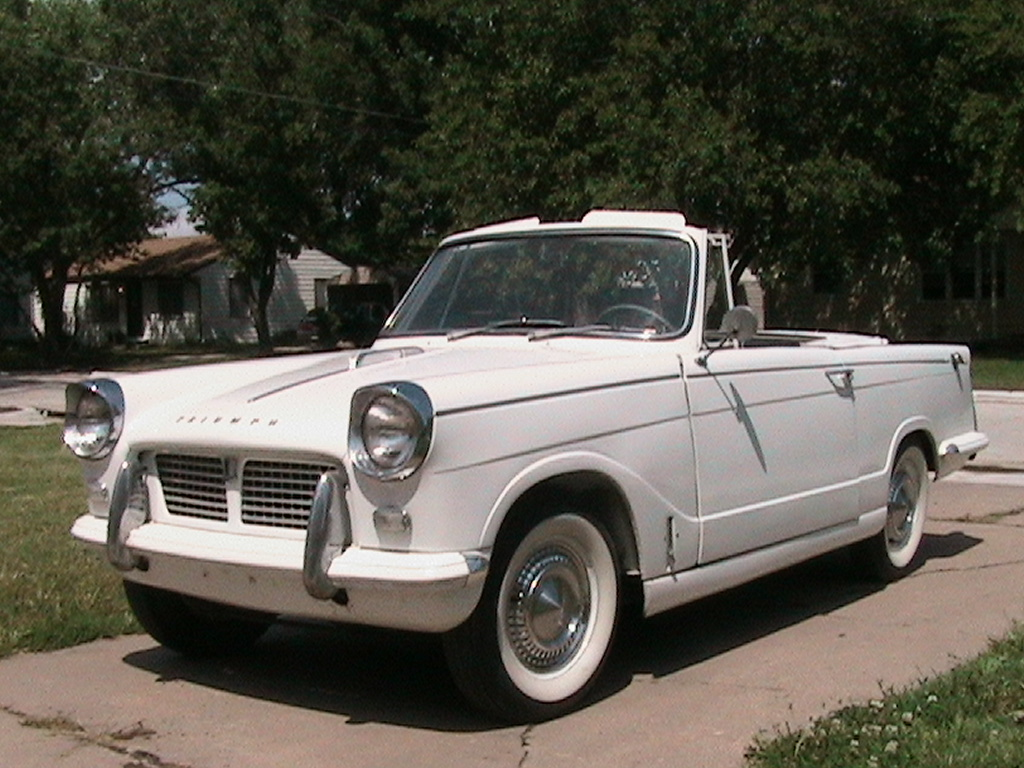
Triumph Herald 948 Convertible (1962)

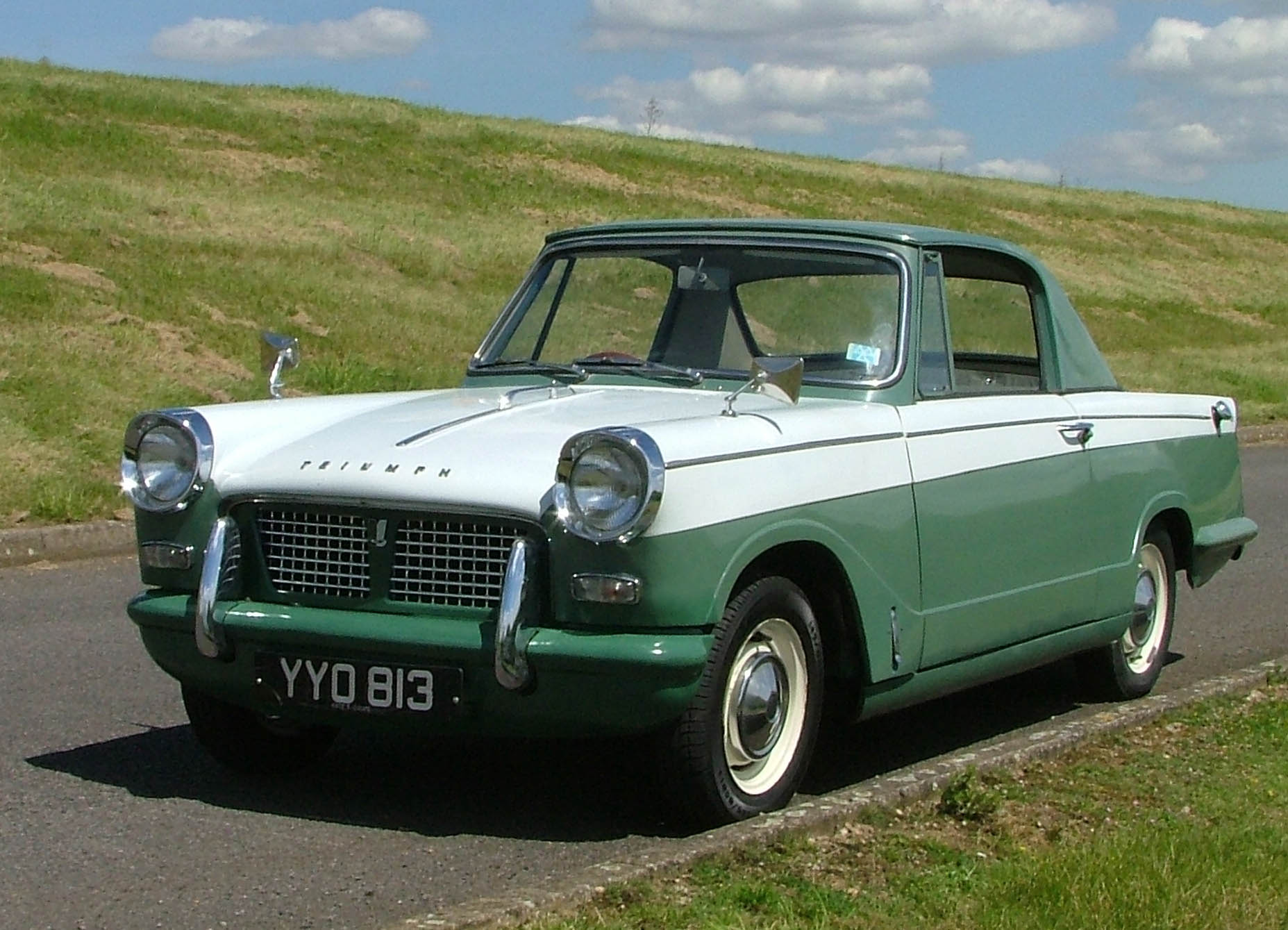
Triumph Herald 948 Coupé

== Herald 1200 ==
Standard-Triumph experienced financial difficulties at the beginning of the 1960s and was taken over by Leyland Motors in 1961. This released new resources to develop the Herald and the car was re-launched in April 1961 with an 1147 cc engine as the Herald 1200. The new model featured rubber-covered bumpers, a wooden laminate dashboard and improved seating. Quality control was also tightened up. Twin carburettors were no longer fitted to any of the range as standard although they remained an option, the standard being a single down-draught Solex carburettor. Claimed maximum power of the Herald 1200 was 39 bhp (29 kW), as against the 34.5 bhp (25.7 kW) claimed for the 948 cc model. One month after the release of the Herald 1200, a 3-door estate was added to the range. Disc brakes became an option from 1962.

Sales picked up despite growing competition from the Mini and the Ford Anglia. The coupé was dropped from the range in late 1964 as it was by then in direct competition with the Triumph Spitfire. The Herald 1200 remained in production until 1970.

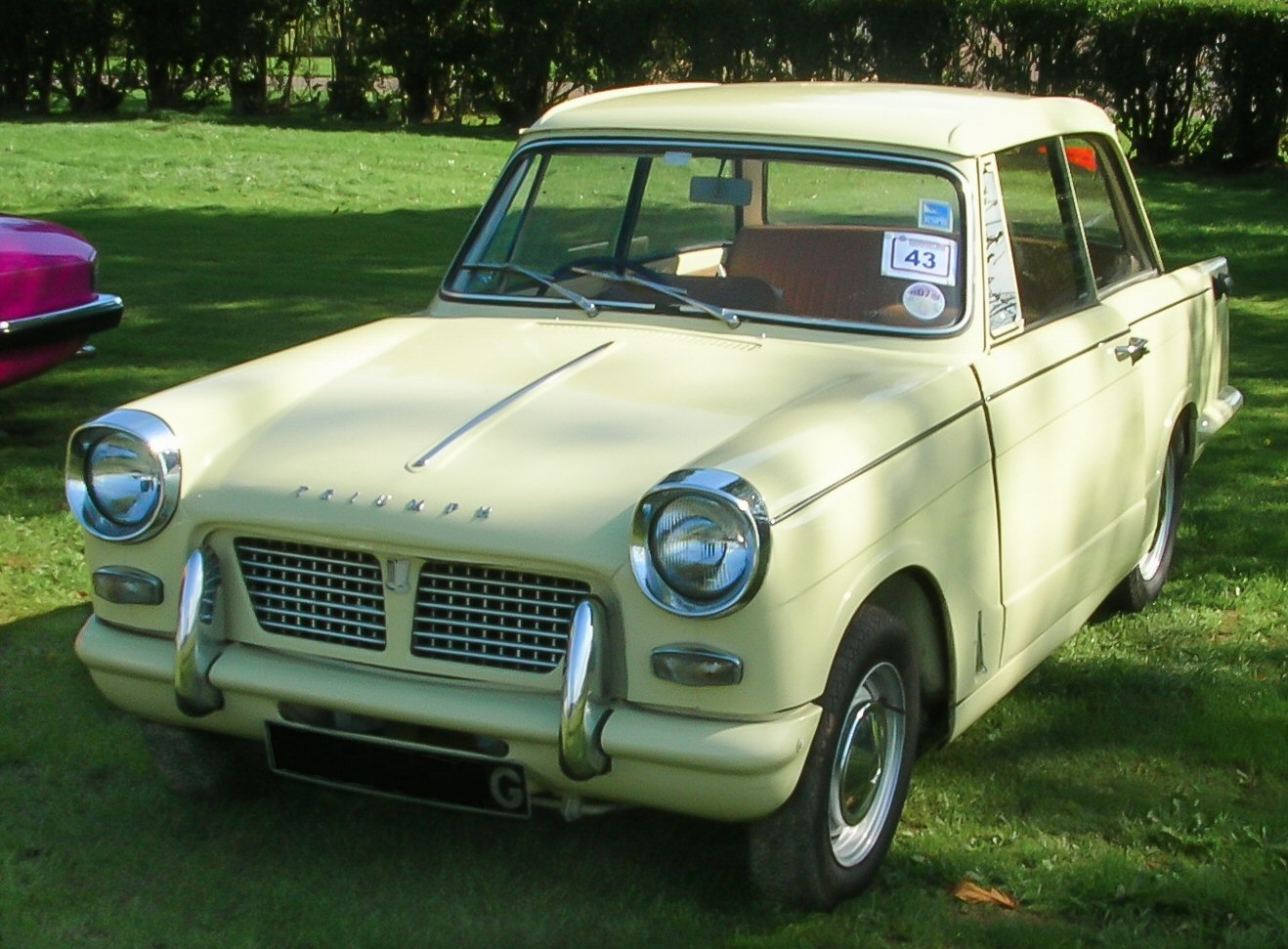
Triumph Herald 1200 Saloon

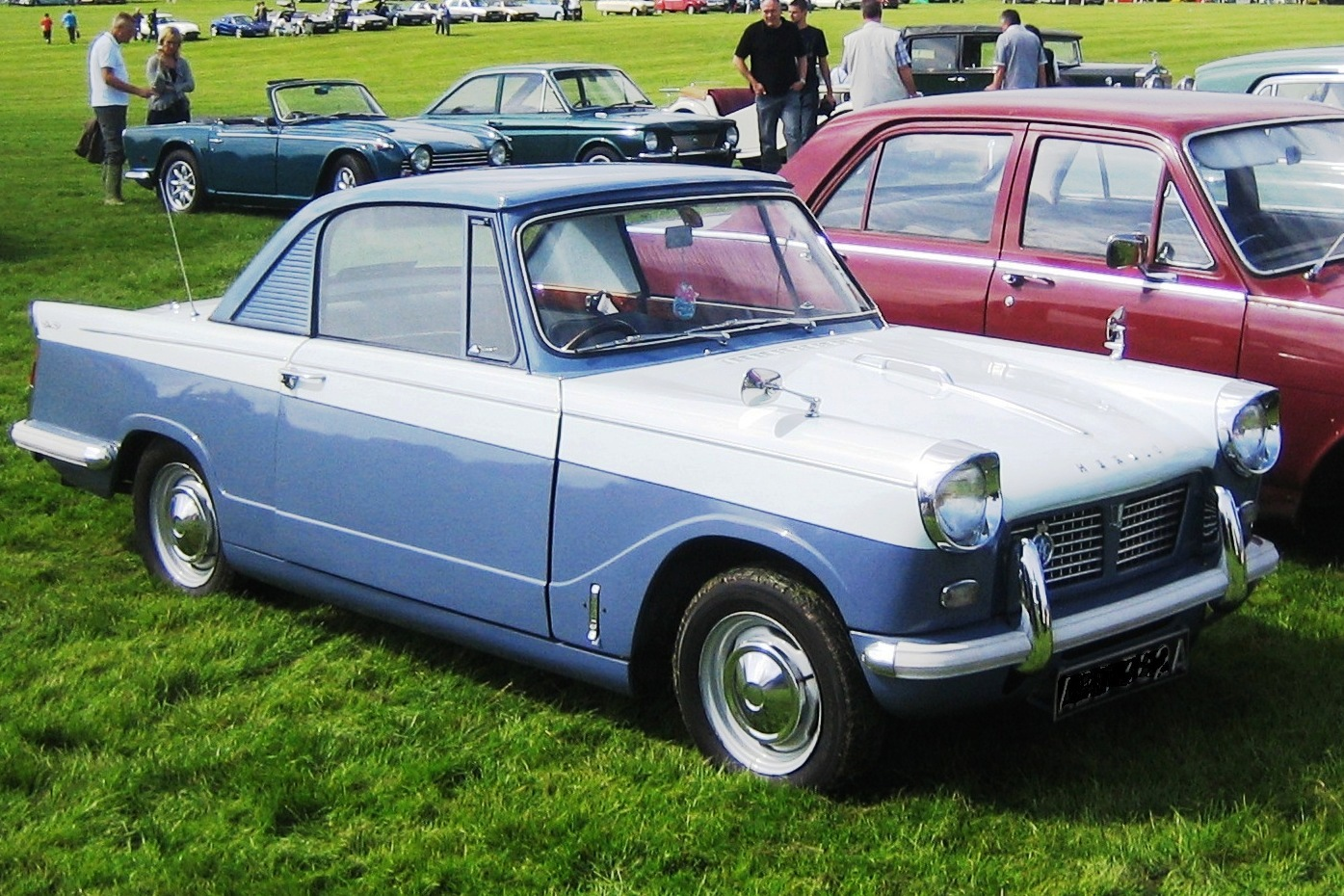
Triumph Herald 1200 Coupé

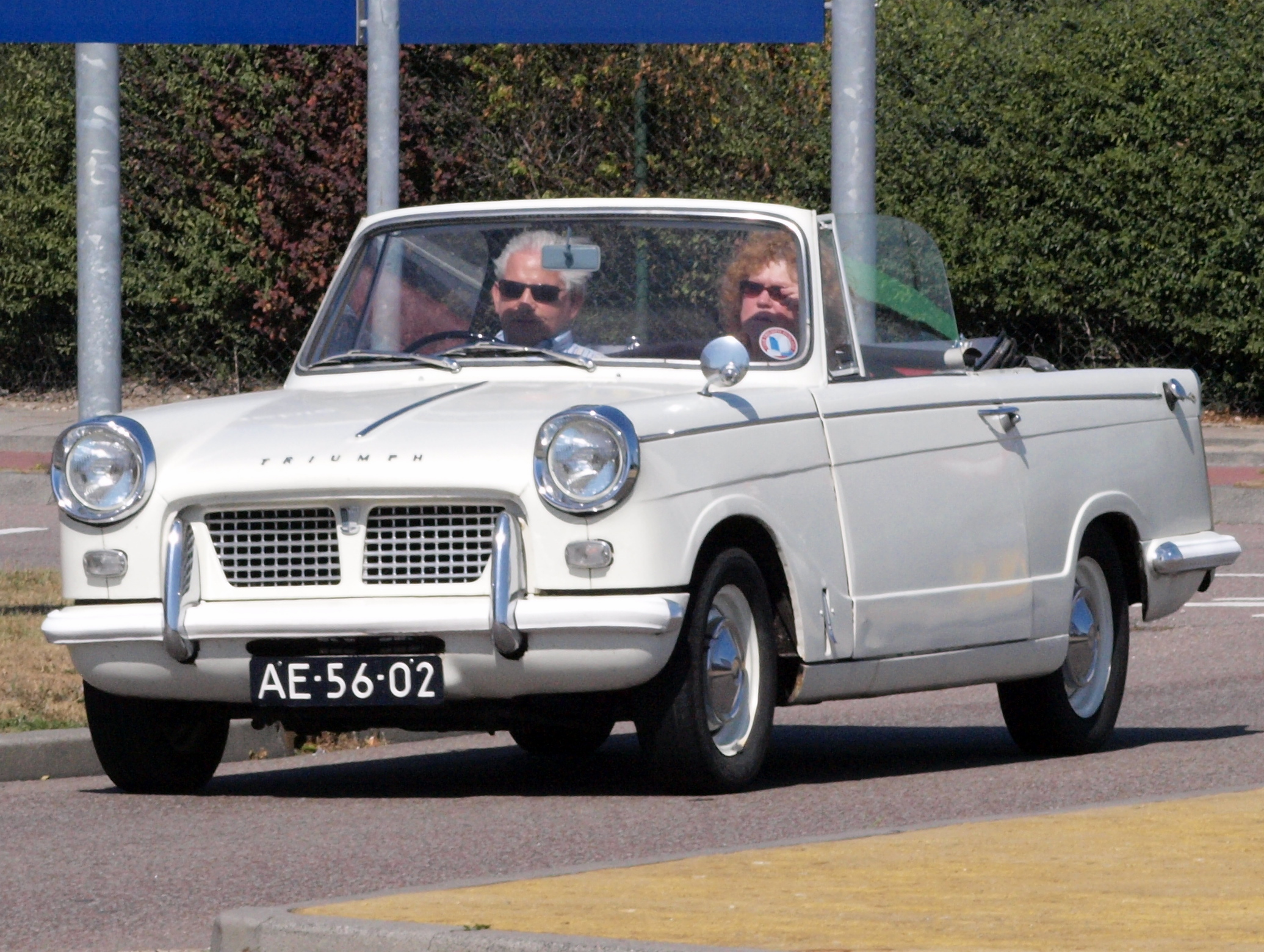
Triumph Herald 1200 Convertible

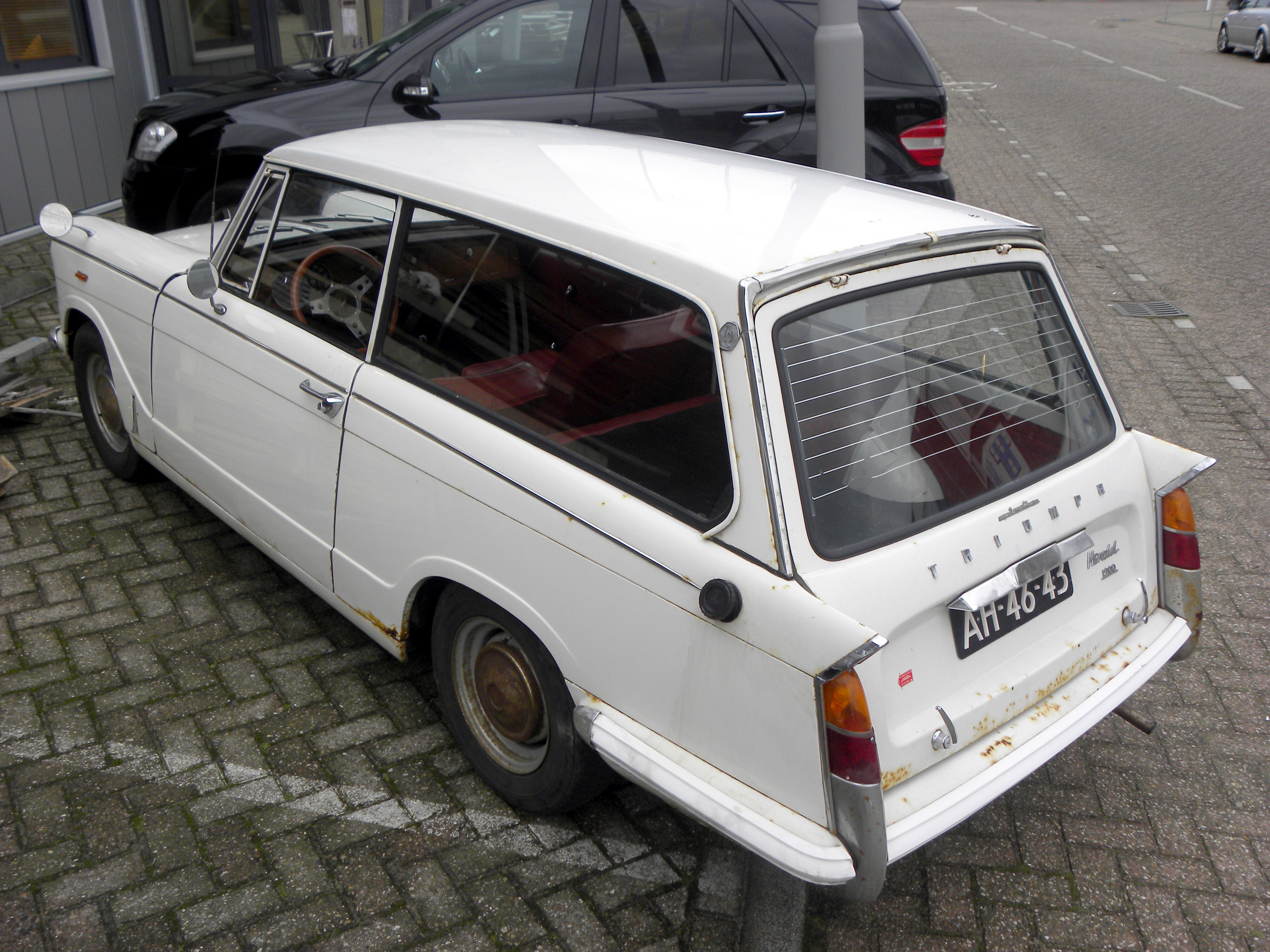
Triumph Herald 1200 Estate

== Courier van ==
The Triumph Courier van, a Herald estate with side panels in place of rear side windows, was produced from 1962 until 1966, but was discontinued following poor sales. Production in England ceased in mid-1964. CKD assembly by MCA in Malta continued till late 1965, at least. The Courier was powered by the 1147 cc engine.

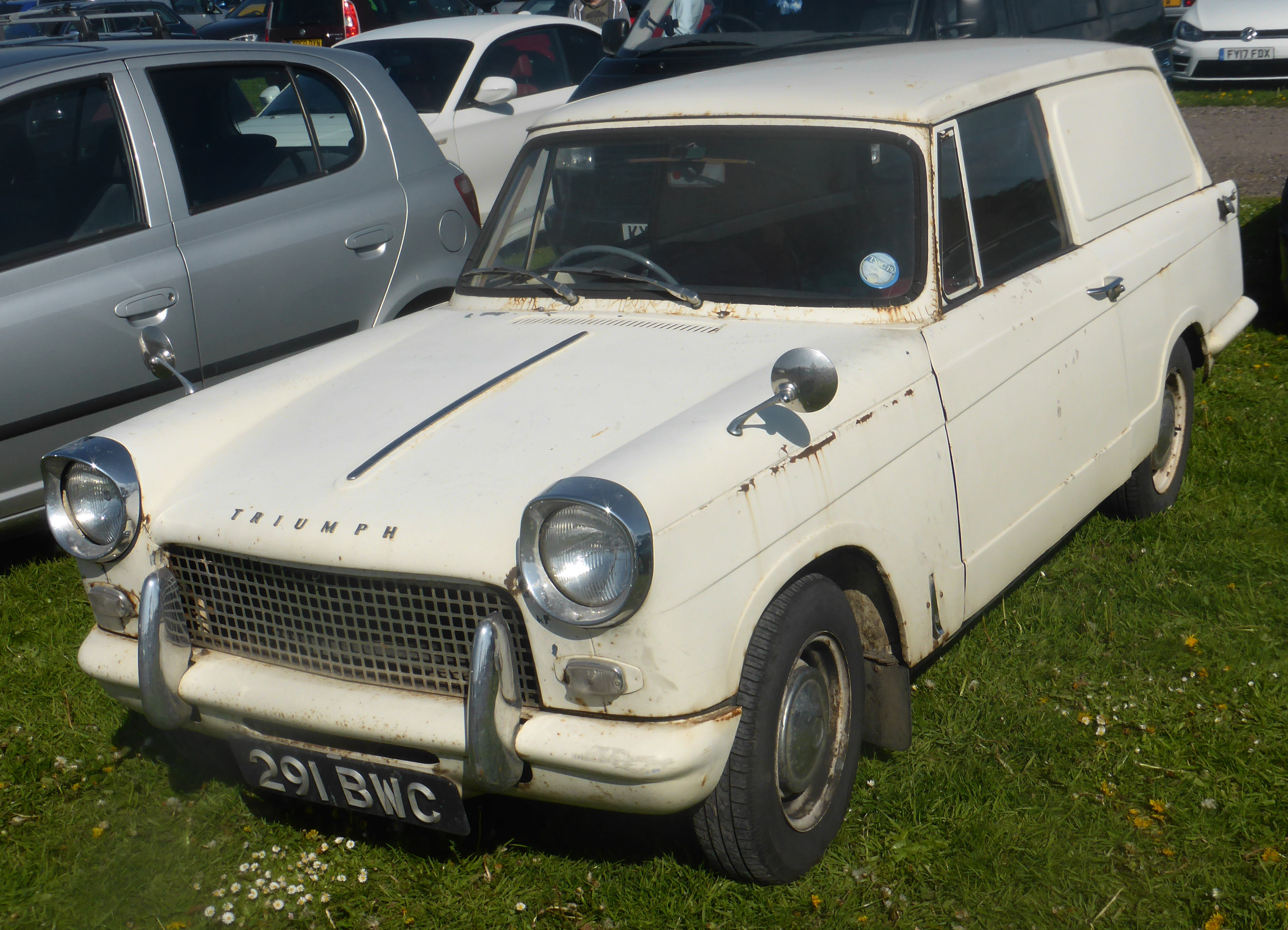
Triumph Courier

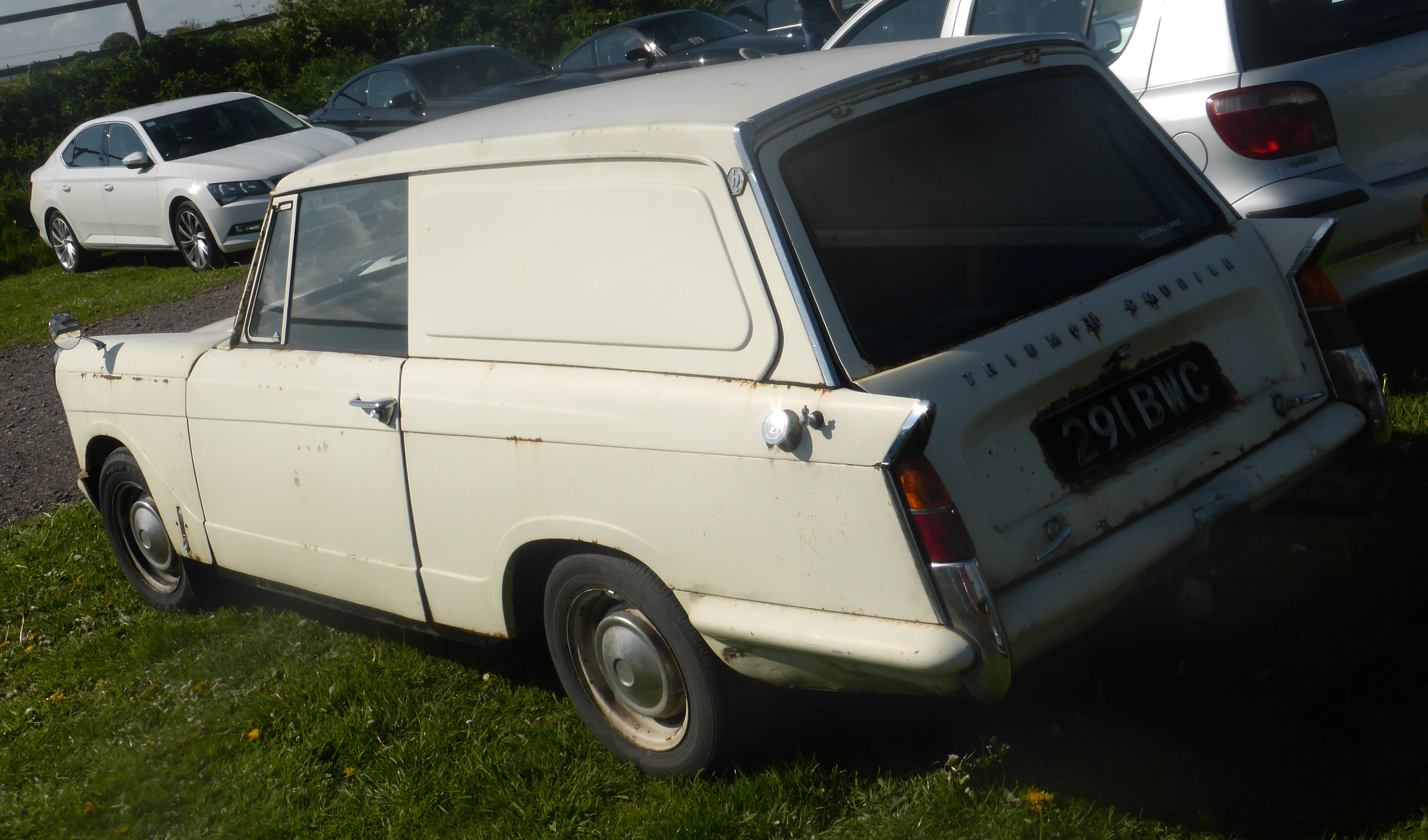
Triumph Courier

== Herald 12/50 ==
An upmarket version, the Herald 12/50, was offered from 1963 to 1967. It featured a tuned engine with a claimed output of 51 bhp (38 kW) in place of the previous 39, along with a sliding (Weathershield) vinyl-fabric sunroof and front disc brakes as standard. The 12/50, which was offered only as a 2-door saloon, was fitted with a fine-barred aluminium grille.

The power output of the 1200, which remained in production alongside the 12/50, was subsequently boosted to 48 bhp.

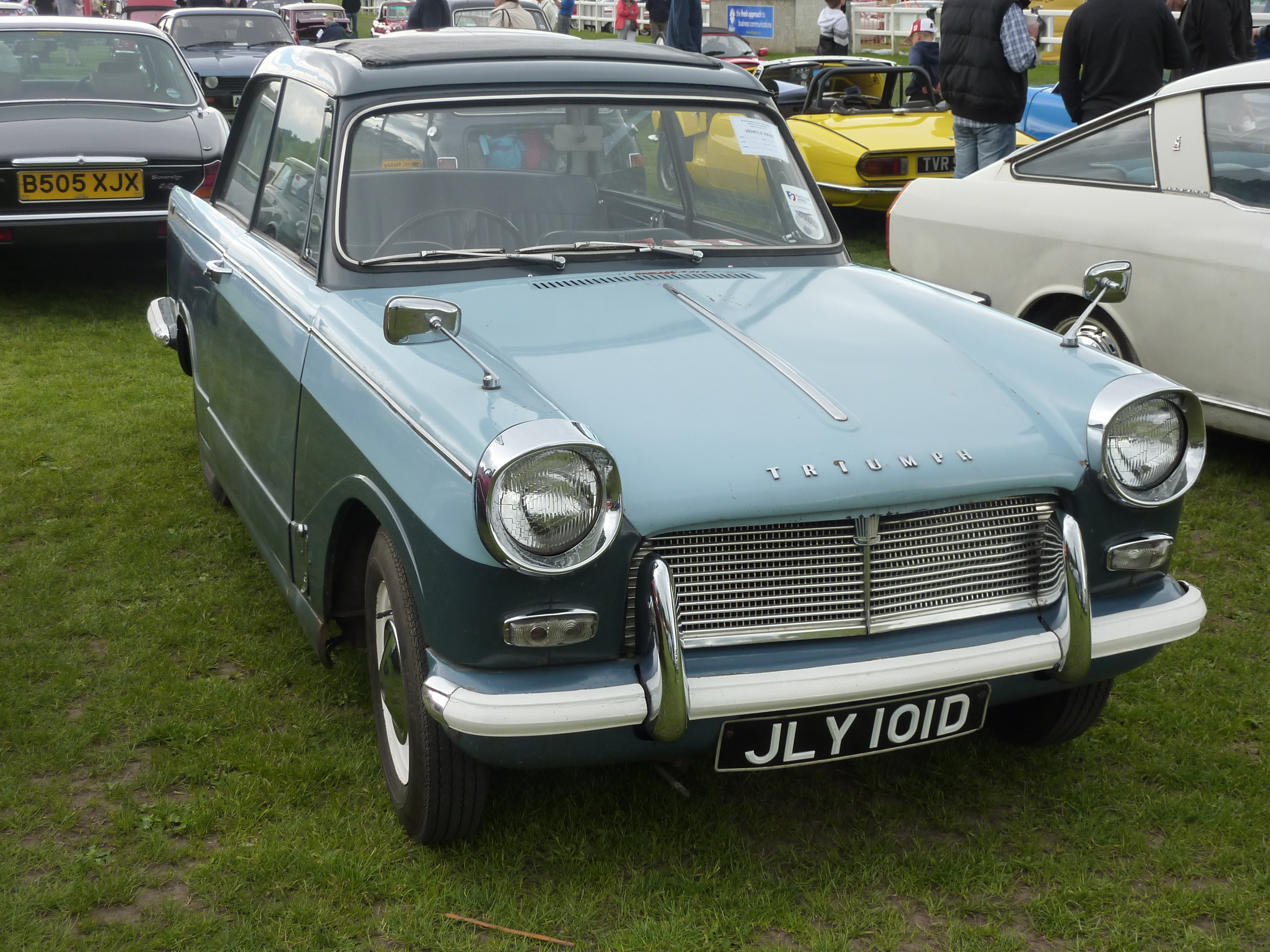
Triumph Herald 12/50

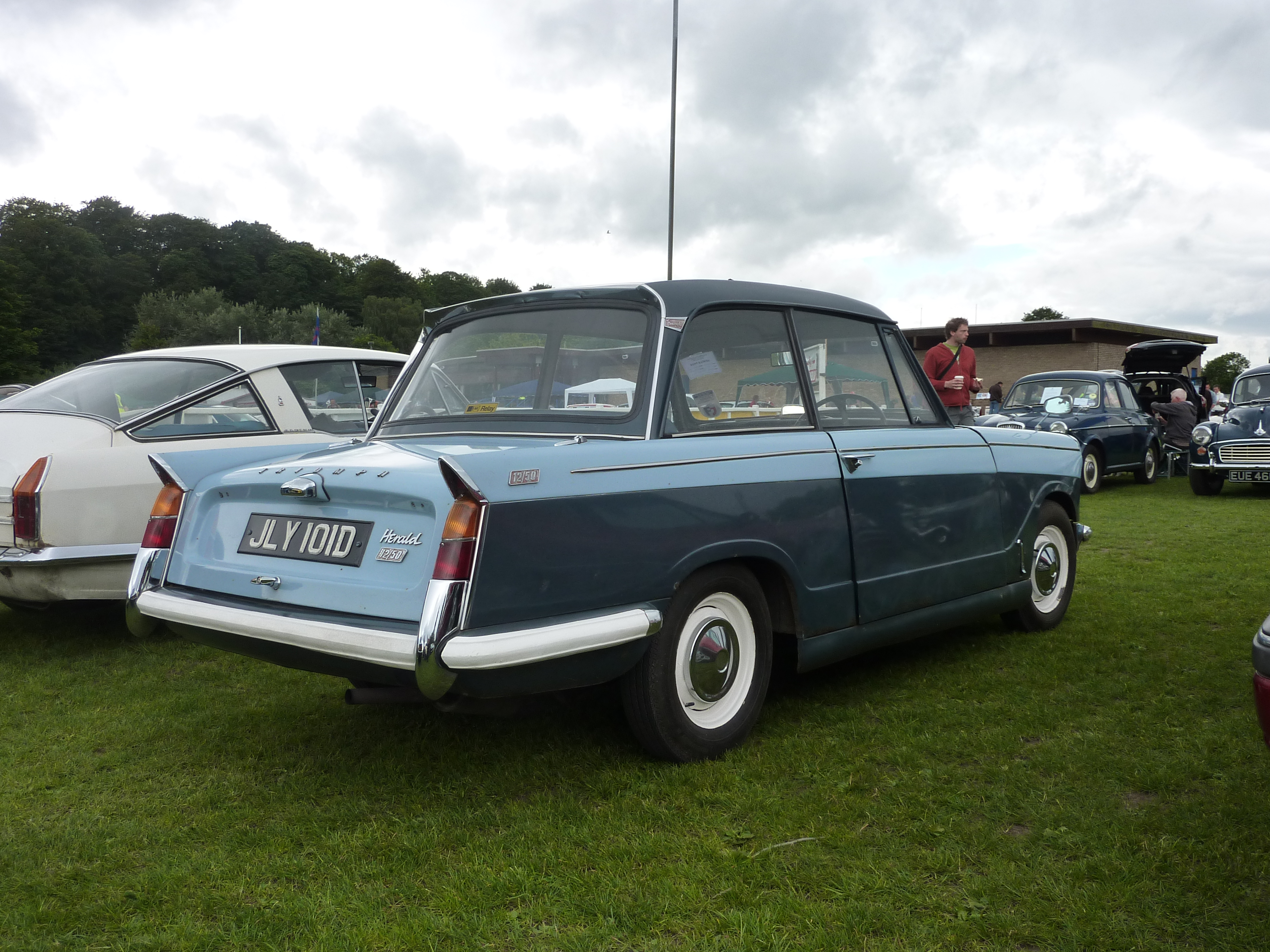
Triumph Herald 12/50

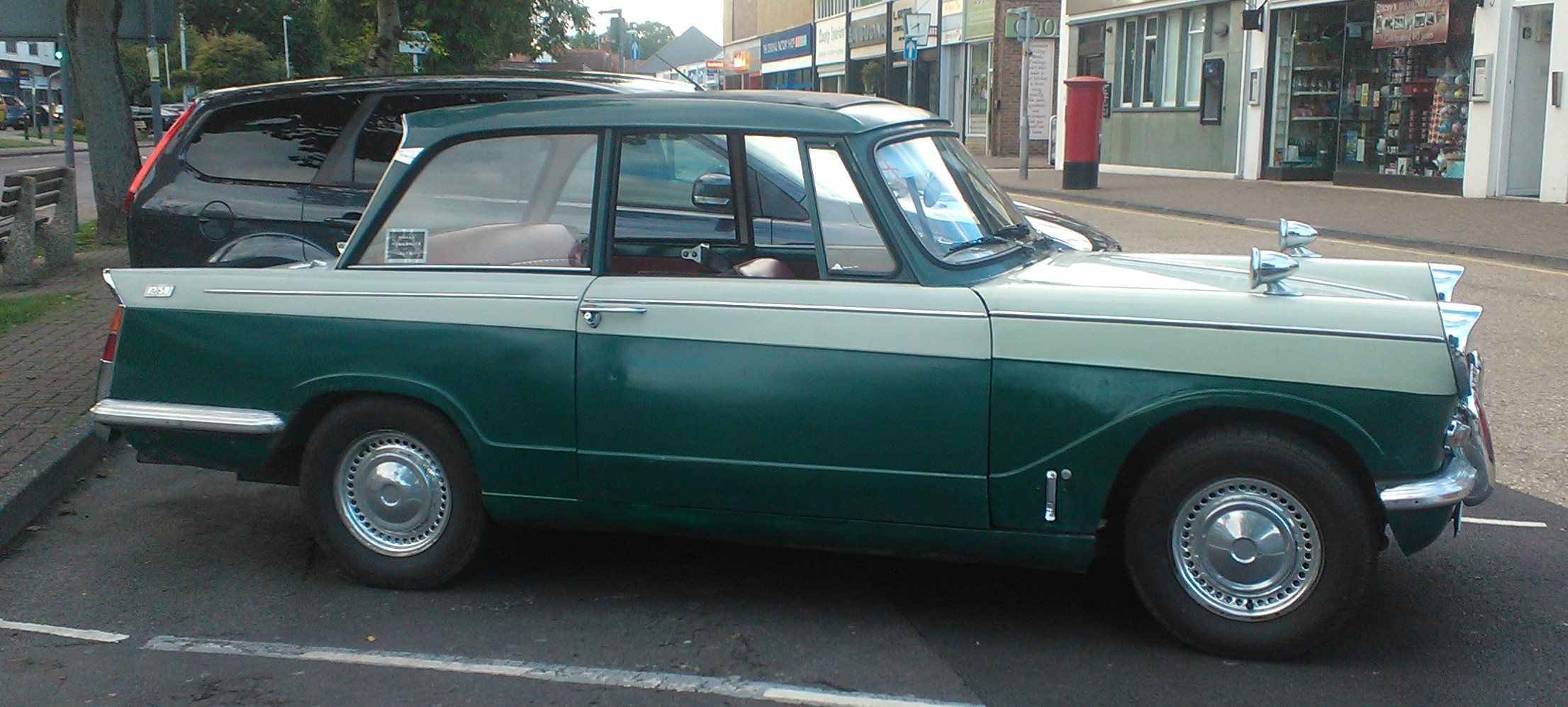
Triumph Herald 12/50 photographed in 2013

== Herald 13/60 ==
In October 1967 the range was updated with the introduction at the London Motor Show of the Herald 13/60. The 13/60 was offered in saloon, convertible and estate-bodied versions. The sun-roof remained available for the saloon as an optional extra rather than a standard feature. The front end was restyled using a bonnet similar to the Triumph Vitesse's and the interior substantially revised though still featuring the wooden dashboard. Interior space was improved by recessing a rear armrest in each side panel. The engine was enlarged to 1296 cc, essentially the unit employed since 1965 in the Triumph 1300, fitted with a Stromberg CD150 carburettor, offering 61 bhp (45 kW) and much improved performance. In this form (though the 1200 saloon was sold alongside it until the end of 1970) the Herald Saloon lasted until December 1970 and the Convertible and Estate until May 1971, by which time, severely outdated in style if not performance, it had already outlived the introduction of the Triumph 1300 Saloon (the car designed to replace it) and was still selling reasonably well but, because of its labour-intensive method of construction, it was selling at a loss.

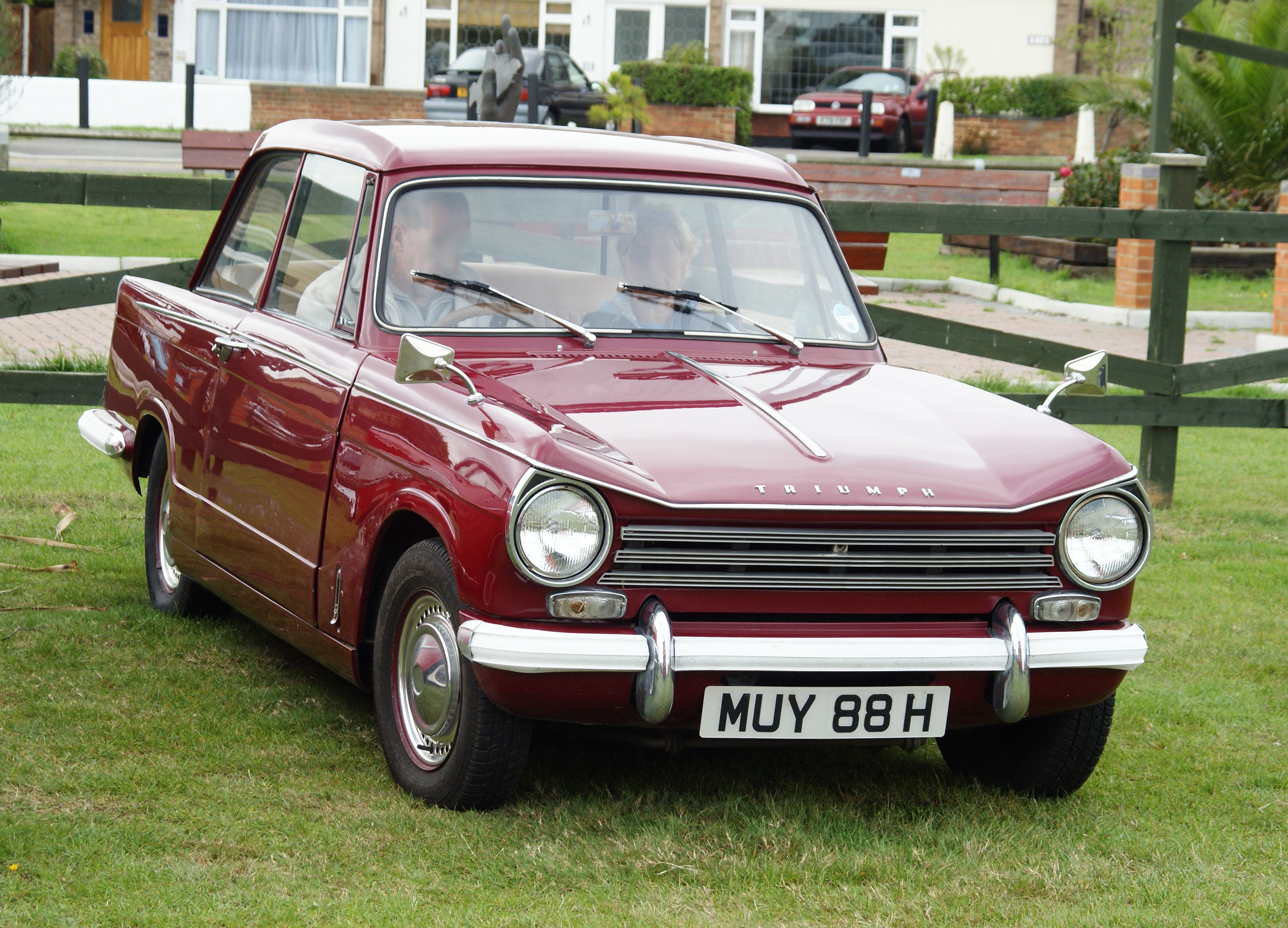
Triumph Herald 13/60 Saloon

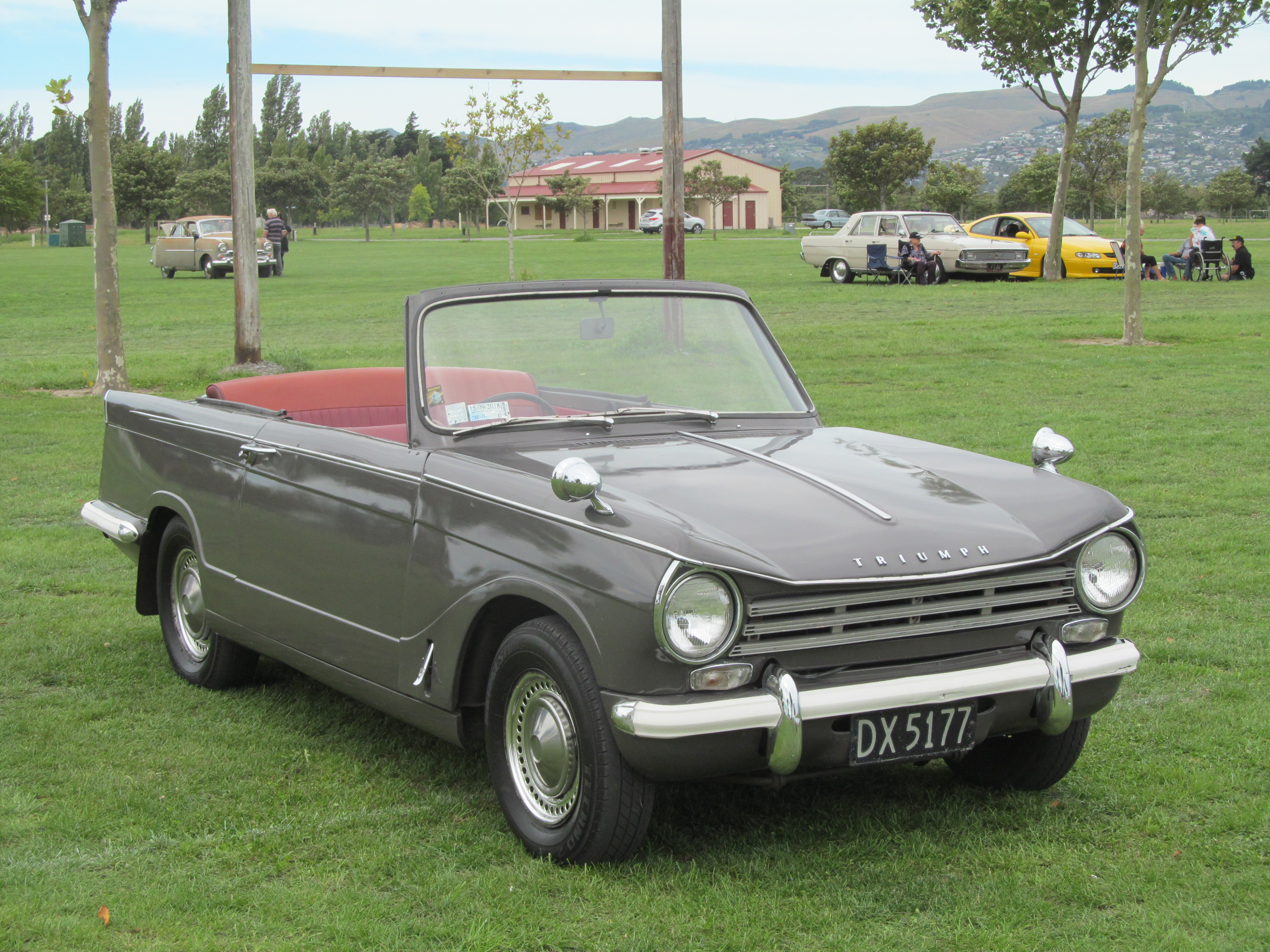
Triumph Herald 13/60 Convertible

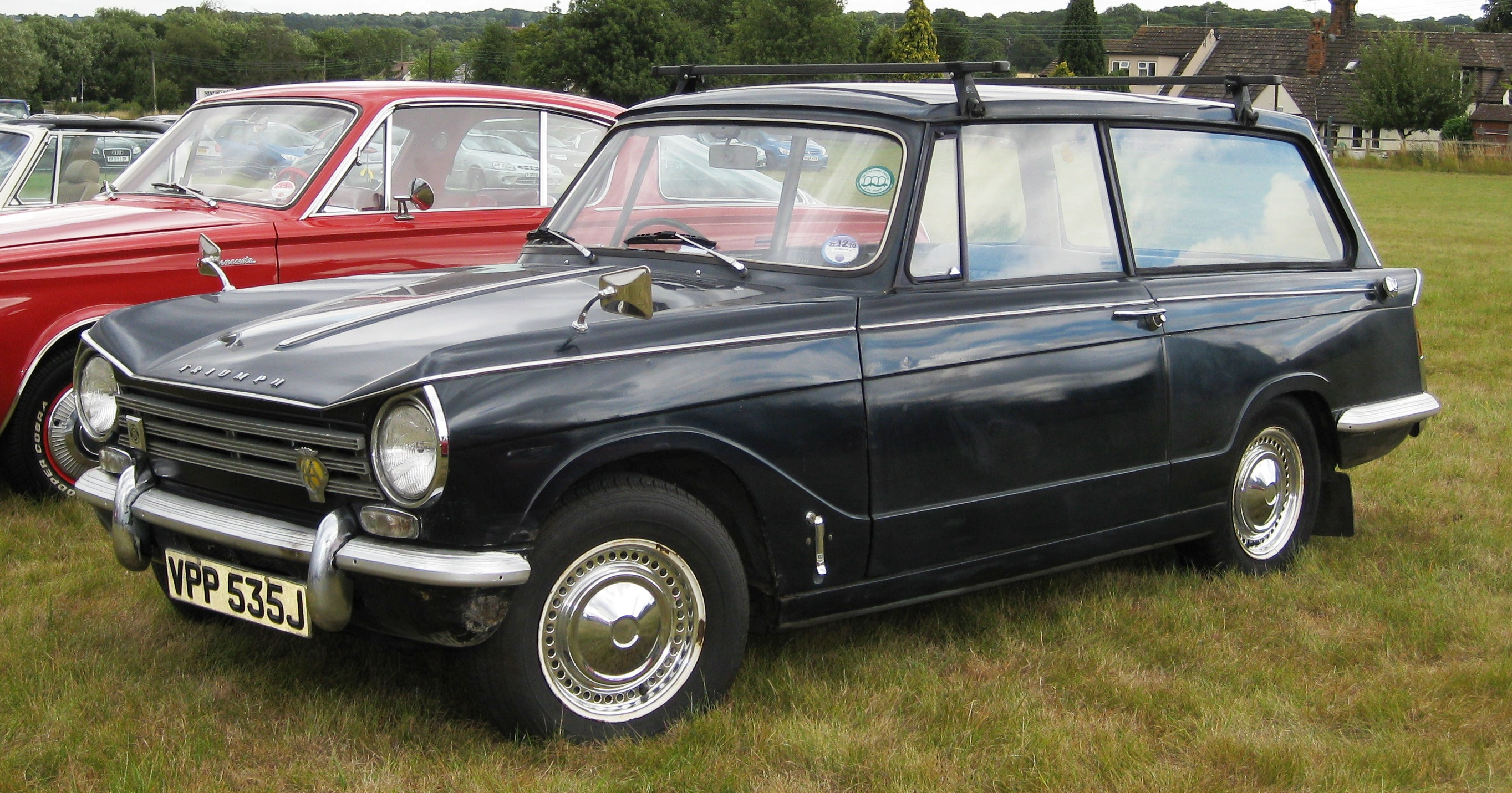
Triumph Herald 13/60 Estate

== International production ==
Triumph Heralds were exported and assembled in a number of countries, and the separate chassis used as a jig to assemble kits exported from Coventry. These cars were referred to as CKD – Complete Knock Down cars.

=== India ===
In the 1960s Standard Motor Products of Madras, India, manufactured Triumph Heralds with the basic 948 cc engine under the name Standard Herald, eventually with additional four-door saloon and five-door estate models exclusively for the Indian market. In 1971 they introduced a restyled four-door saloon based on the Herald called the Standard Gazel, using the same 948 cc engine but with the axle changed to that of the Toledo, as the Herald's "swing-arm" was deemed unable to cope with road conditions in the Indian interior. The Gazel was discontinued in 1977.

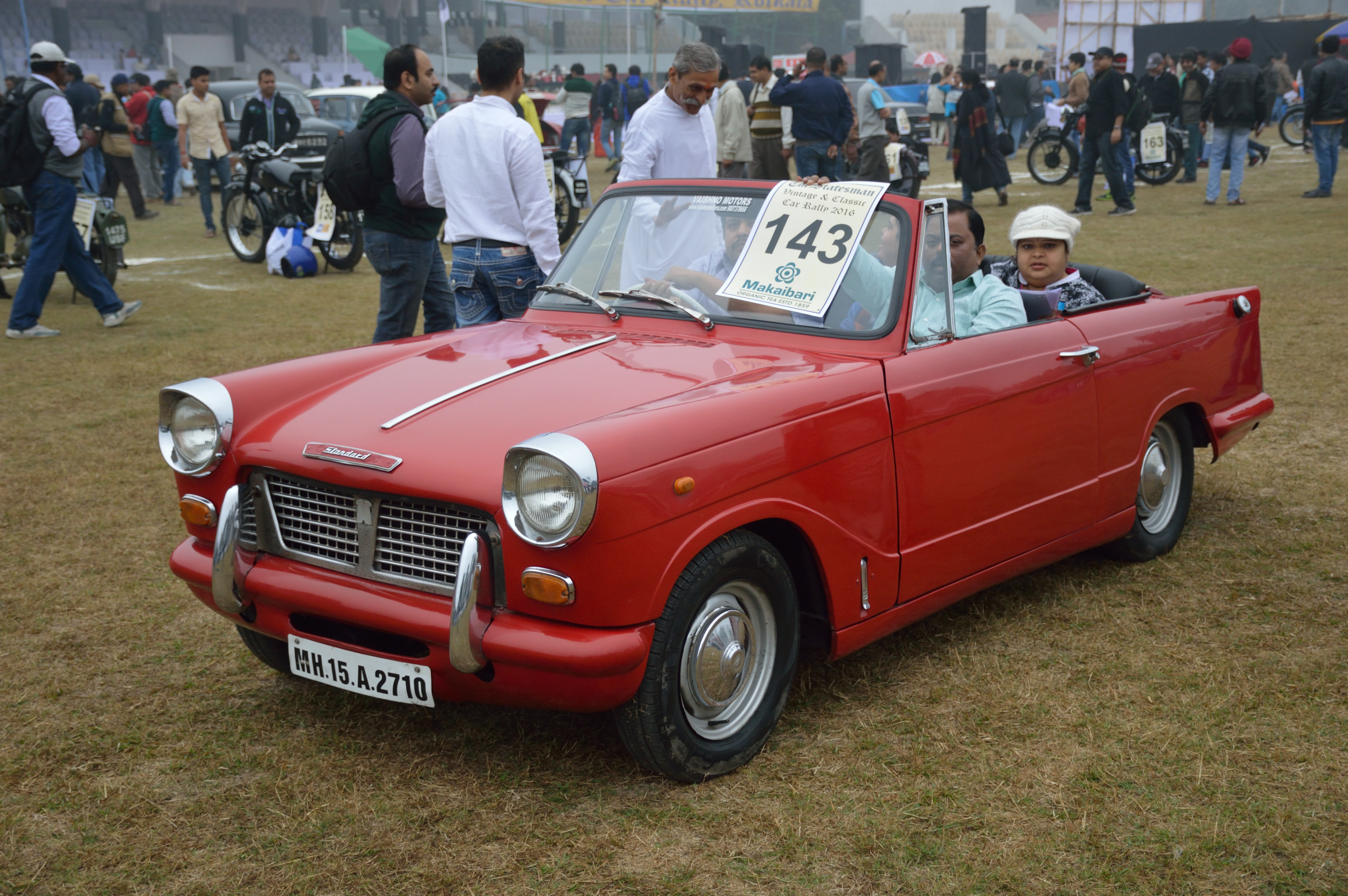
Standard Herald Mark 1

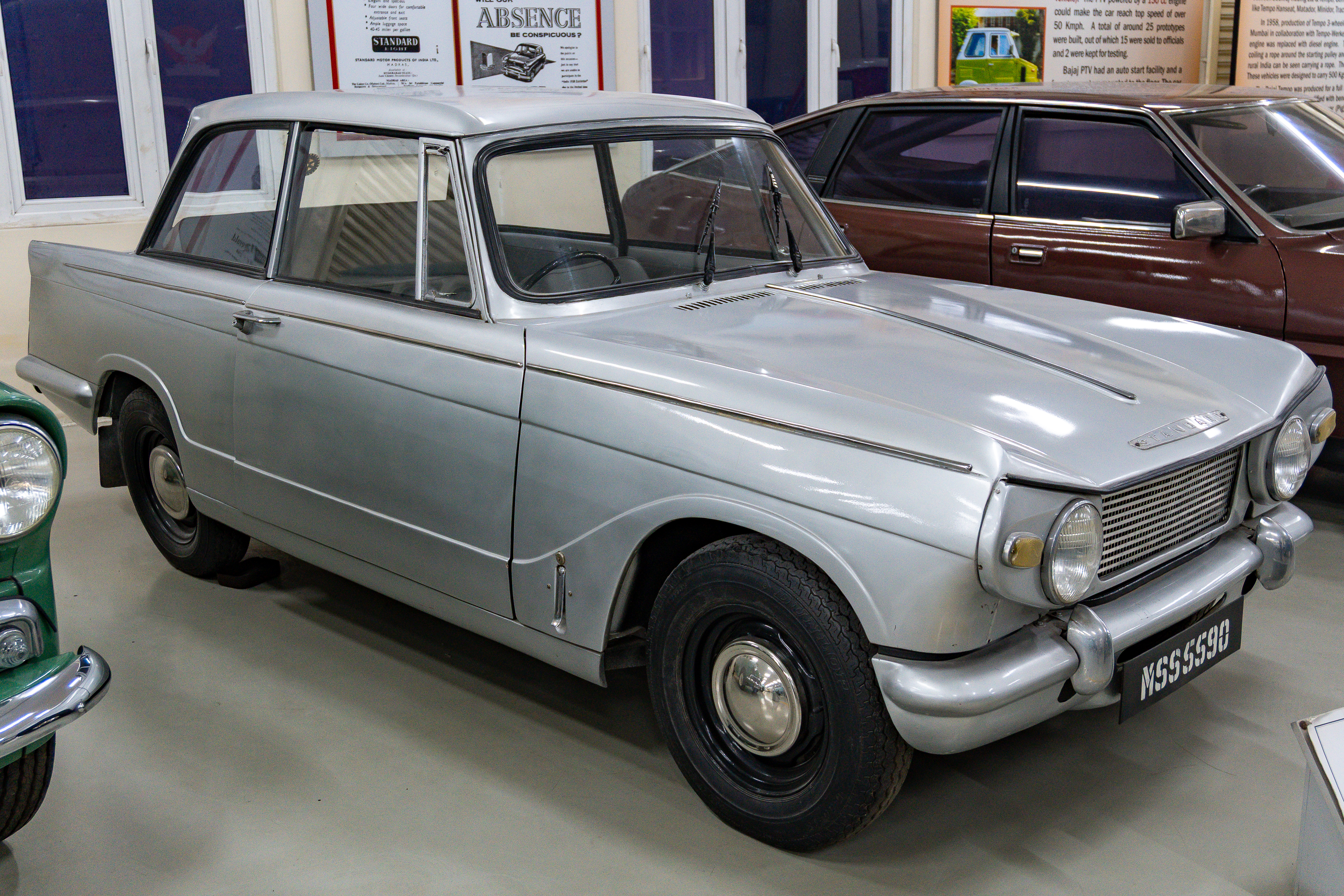
Standard Herald Mark 2

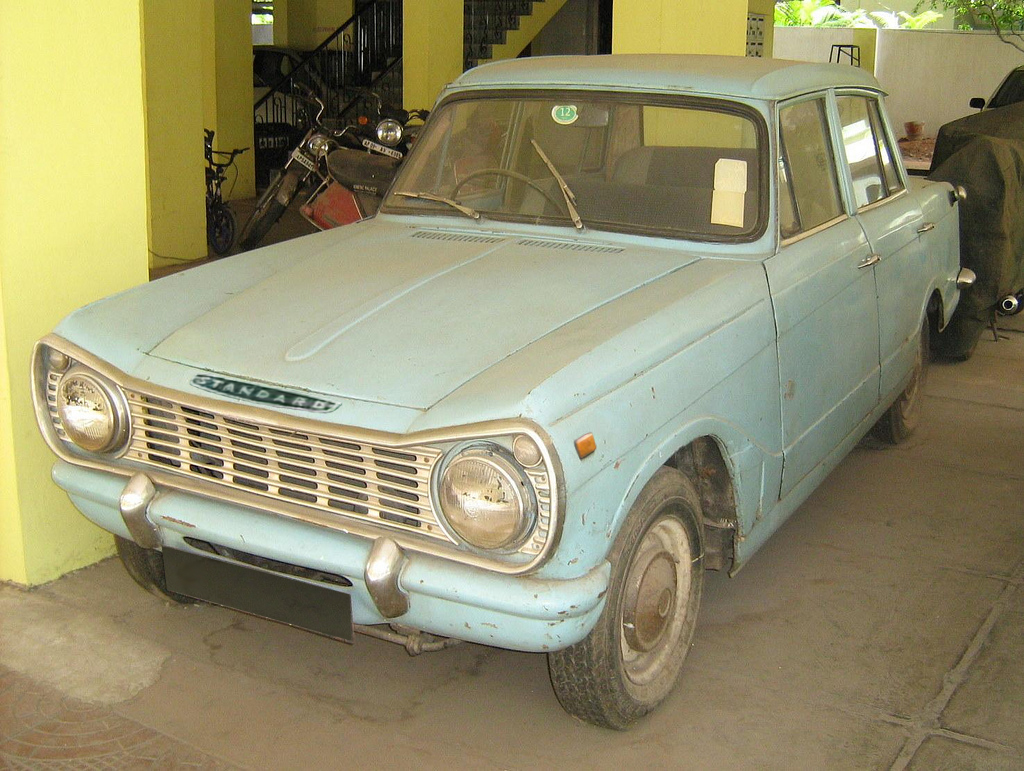
Standard Gazel Saloon

=== Australia ===
The Herald was produced in Australia by Australian Motor Industries from 1959 to 1966 with output totalling 14,975 units. Production included a 12/50 model, which unlike its British namesake was offered in both saloon and coupé body styles. It featured the bonnet and four angled headlights of the Triumph Vitesse and was marketed as the Triumph 12/50, without Herald badges.

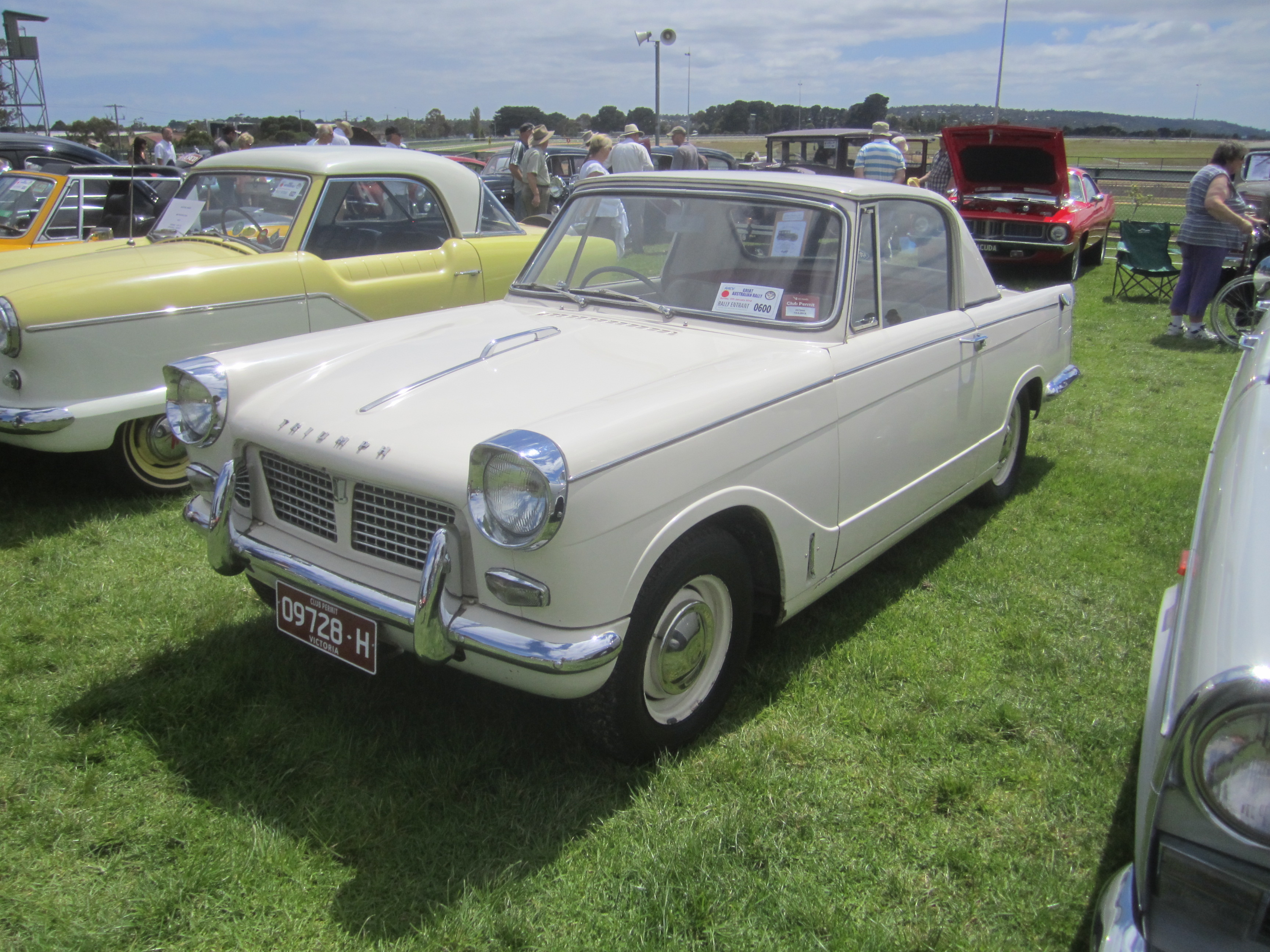
Triumph Herald assembled by AMI

=== Others ===
Triumph Heralds were also assembled in South Africa, New Zealand, Ireland, Malta, and at two locations in Peru. The Herald 1200 was also assembled in Italy, at Ducati's Borgo Panigale motorcycle factory.

== In popular media ==
A Triumph Herald convertible was driven by Tony Franciosa in the 1966 film A Man Could Get Killed. A 1961 Triumph Herald convertible was blown up in the 1971 film Melody. A Herald was used at the 2012 London Olympic Games during the beginning of the closing ceremony when cars were paraded around the stadium. In the 1960s based TV drama Heartbeat, Dr Kate Rowan drove a cactus green Herald from series 1 until series 5. In the TV comedy series Last of the Summer Wine, Edie drove a red Herald convertible, restored by her husband Wesley. A Herald converted to a sailing boat appeared in 2006 (series 8, episode 3) and 2007 (series 10, episode 2) on TV series Top Gear. It was driven and sailed by presenter James May. A white Herald 1360 convertible was driven by the actor Paul McGann in the 1990 film Paper Mask, when he played a hospital porter who decided to impersonate a doctor. There is an affectionate portrayal of a Triumph Herald Estate car in the novel Room for Us by Roger Harvey (2020, ISBN 9781800318342). David Niven drove a beaten-up Herald convertible to escape from terrorists in the 1975 movie Paper Tiger. In the Luann comic strip, Mrs. DeGroot tells her children that she was first attracted to their father because he drove a blue Triumph Herald convertible.

A blue Triumph Herald 13/60 Convertible was one of the main features of the film Soft Top Hard Shoulder written by and starring Peter Capaldi, co-starring his wife Elaine Collins and released in the UK in 1993.

== Herald-based cars ==
The Equipe was a car produced by Bond, using the Triumph Herald chassis and components.

Having a separate body mounted to a chassis, the Triumph Herald provides a sound basis for a kit car. Examples include:

- Sussita 12 – (1968–1970) A car made in Israel, manufactured by Israeli Autocars Company Ltd. The Susita 12 station wagon, and sedan (named Carmel), used the Triumph Herald 12/50 engine.
- Sussita 13/60 – (1970–1975) An Israeli made car, manufactured by Israeli Autocars Company Ltd. Manufactured as 2 doors station wagon, sedan (named Carmel Ducas), and pick-up versions. Built on the Triumph Herald's chassis, and used the Herald 13/60 engine and gearbox.
- The "T car" by New Zealand company Alternative Cars is a MGTF "replica", which, although not an exact copy of the MGTF, has some of the spirit of the original. About 250 were made and they have a high survival rate. It has its body made of fibreglass with a steel bonnet.
- Early versions of the Marlin used Herald components.
- Gentry Cars – again, loosely based on the MG TF.
- Spartan Cars – a traditional styled open 2 seater.
- Moss cars could be based on either Triumph or Ford components.

The German-designed and built amphibious Amphicar used the same 1147cc engine as the Herald, and though not designed by Michelotti, has a strong family resemblance.

== Scale models and die-cast ==
- Meccano Dinky Toys; No. 189 (production 1959–1963), Herald 948 cc, approximately O scale (1/44). The Dinky Triumph Herald was the very first scale model introduced to coincide with an actual car launch.
- Corgi No. 231 (production 1961–1965), Herald Coupé 948 cc, approximately O scale (1/44).
- Airfix; 1/32 scale. Introduced in 1967 as a bagged kit.
- Hongwell available in 1/43 scale
