= Marlin Sportscars =

Marlin Sportscars Ltd
- Company type: British Sportscar Manufacturer
- Industry: Automobiles
- Founded: 1979
- Founder: Paul Moorhouse
- Headquarters: Crediton, Devon, England, UK

Marlin is a British sports car manufacturer founded in 1979 in Plymouth as Marlin Engineering and now located in Crediton, Devon, England.

The company was founded by Paul Moorhouse, who, after building a series of one-off cars for his own use, decided to put one into production as a kit car. The first kits were sold in 1979.

The first product was the Roadster, which remained in the line-up until sold, along with the Berlinetta, to Yorkshire Kit Cars (YKC) in 1992. YKC kept them in production until the owner retired in 2006 and sold them on to Aquila Sports Cars Ltd.

In the mid 1990s, the company was sold to Terry and Mark Matthews, who introduced the Hunter model.

In 2016, Marlin bought Avatar Sports Cars primarily to build roadsters. As of May 2019, Marlin Sports Cars has ceased trading and the company is for sale. No further production is planned.

In April 2021, Kevin Richardson bought the company.

== Marlin Roadster ==
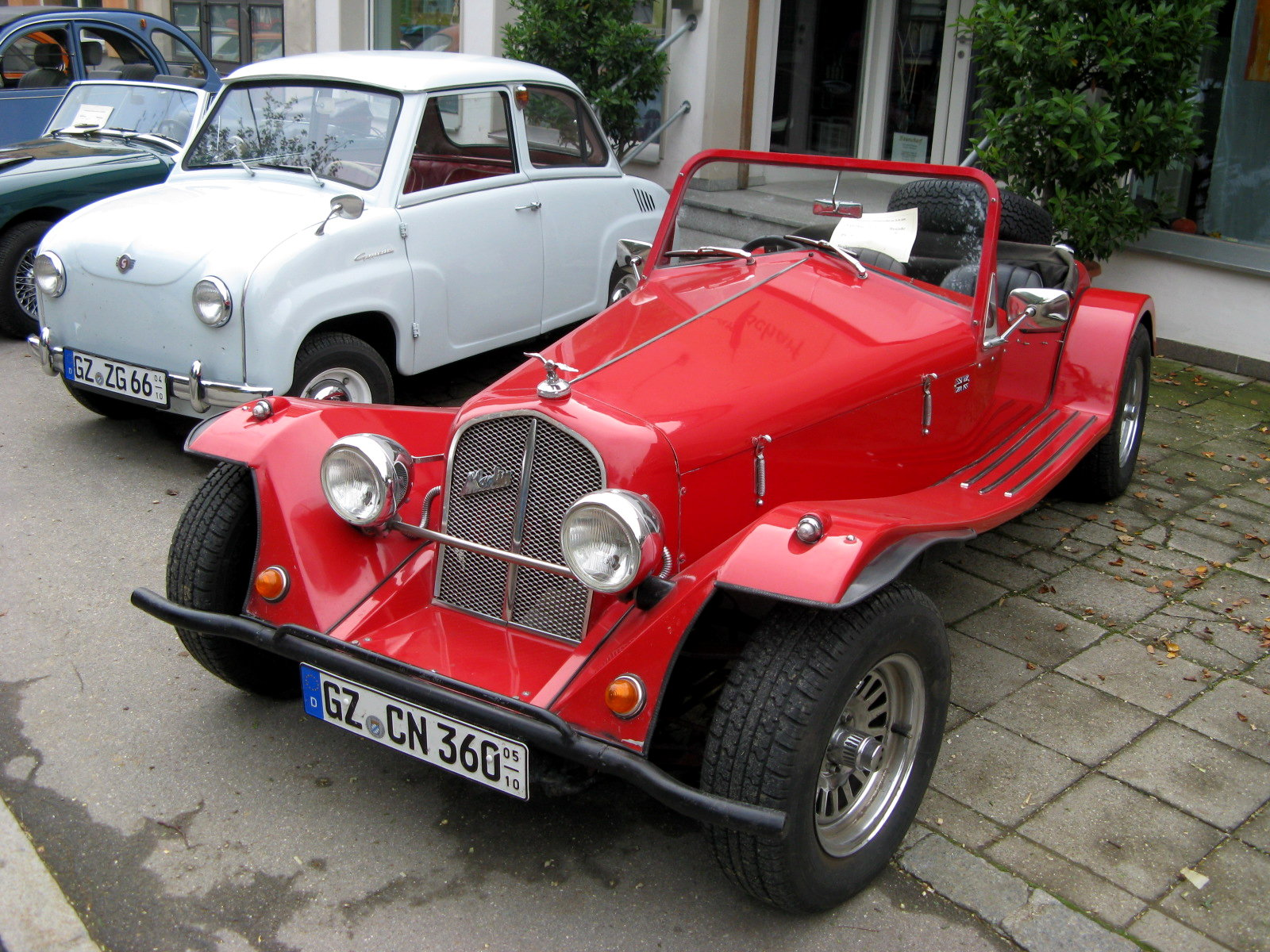

The Roadster was the original car and was based around components from the Triumph Herald range (which included the Spitfire, Herald, Vitesse and GT6). The two-seat body, built of aluminium and glass fibre, had a radiator grille slightly similar to pre-war Alfa Romeo sports cars. As standard, any of Triumph's 4- or 6-cylinder engines of the time could be fitted (1147-2498cc), along with overdrive or non-overdrive gearboxes. In 1981, the Morris Marina became the donor car, replacing the Triumph; the Marina engine became standard, although many customers fitted engines, gearboxes and back axles of their own choice. Fitted with the two-litre inline-six from a late Triumph Vitesse, a top speed of 177 km/h (110 mph) was achievable.

== Berlinetta ==
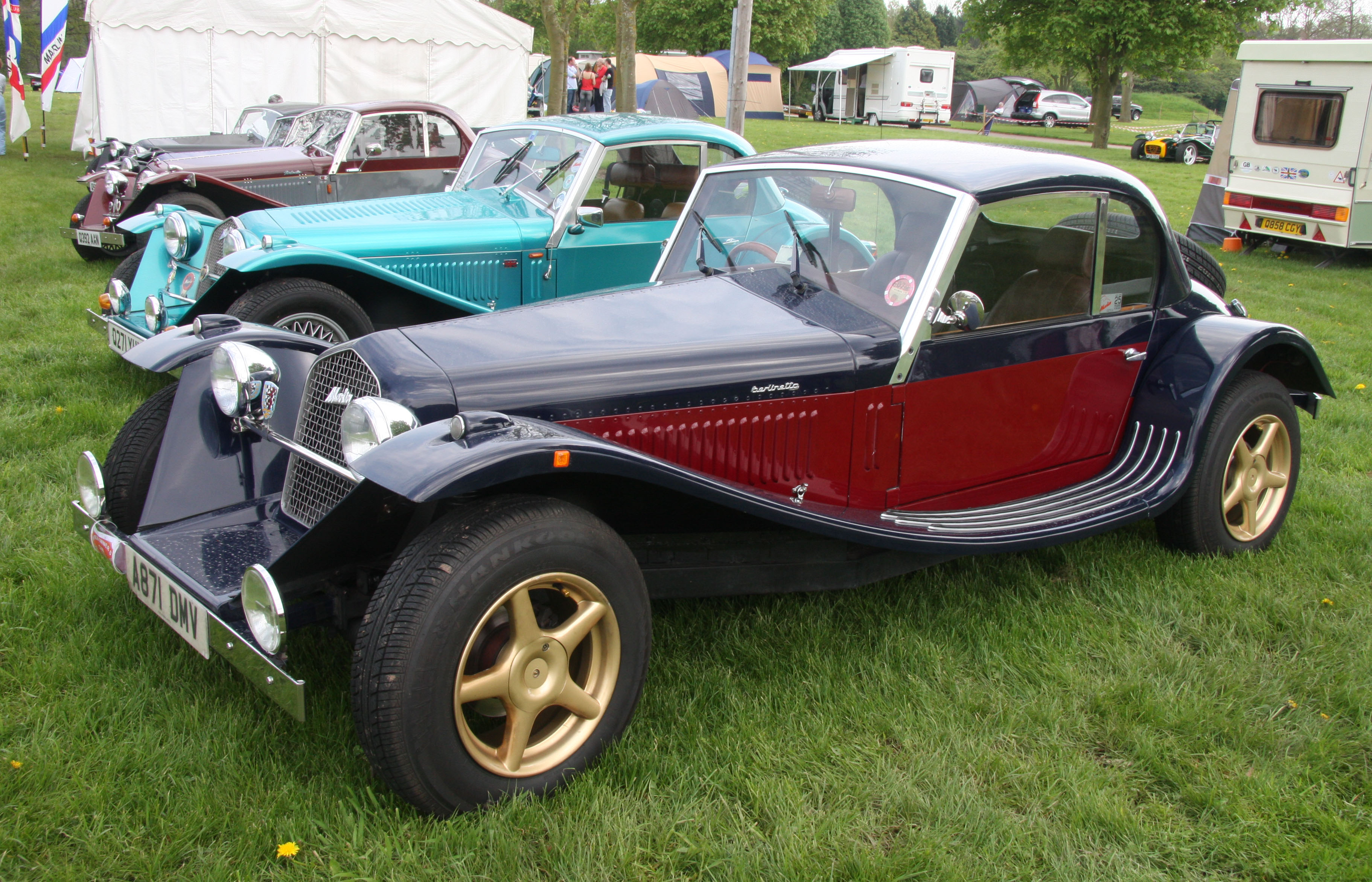

The Berlinetta was launched in 1983 version using Ford Cortina Mk III or IV parts. Some Roadster buyers wanted more room for their children and partners, so 1983 saw the introduction of the Ford Cortina (later, Sierra)-based Berlinettas as a 2+2 coupé. This came complete with new features such as wind-up windows, a lockable boot and a hardtop option. A touring car rather than a sports car, the coupé's sales were lower than the Roadster's, mainly due to the more limited market for such a car.

== Cabrio ==
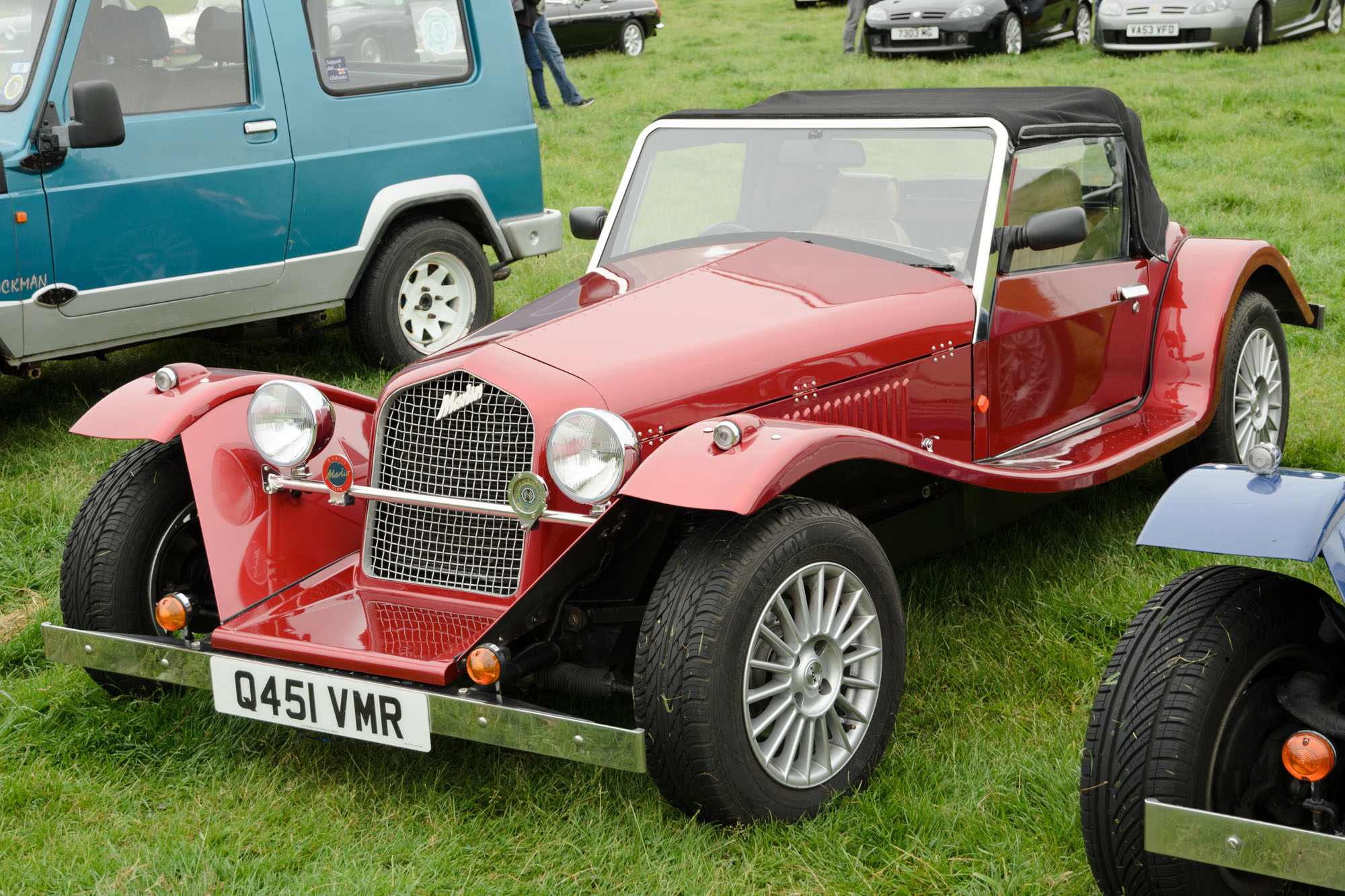

The 1991 Cabrio was an updated Roadster based on Ford Sierra parts.

== Hunter ==
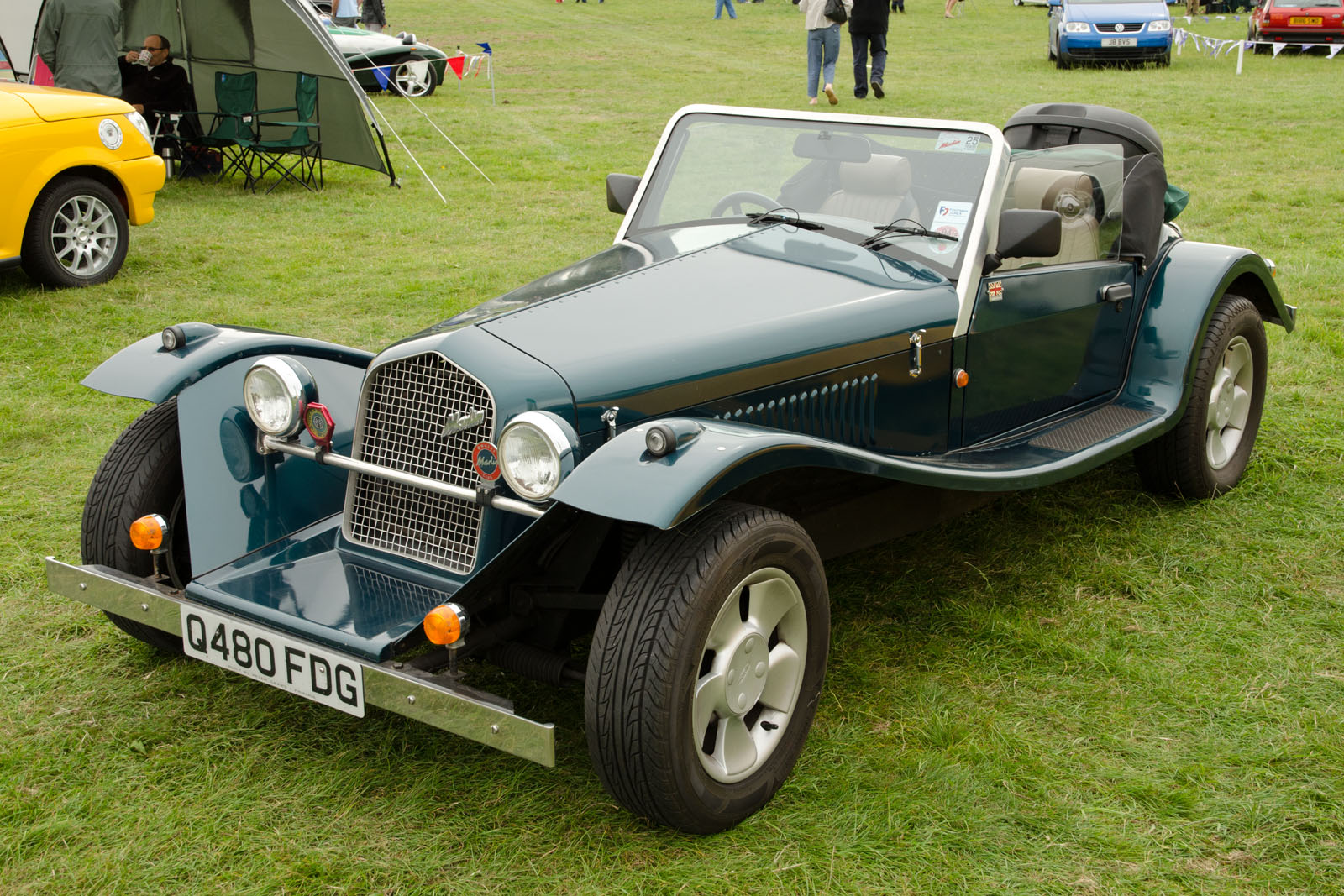

Based on the Cabrio, the Hunter was a complete, factory-built car.

== Sportster ==
Sportster
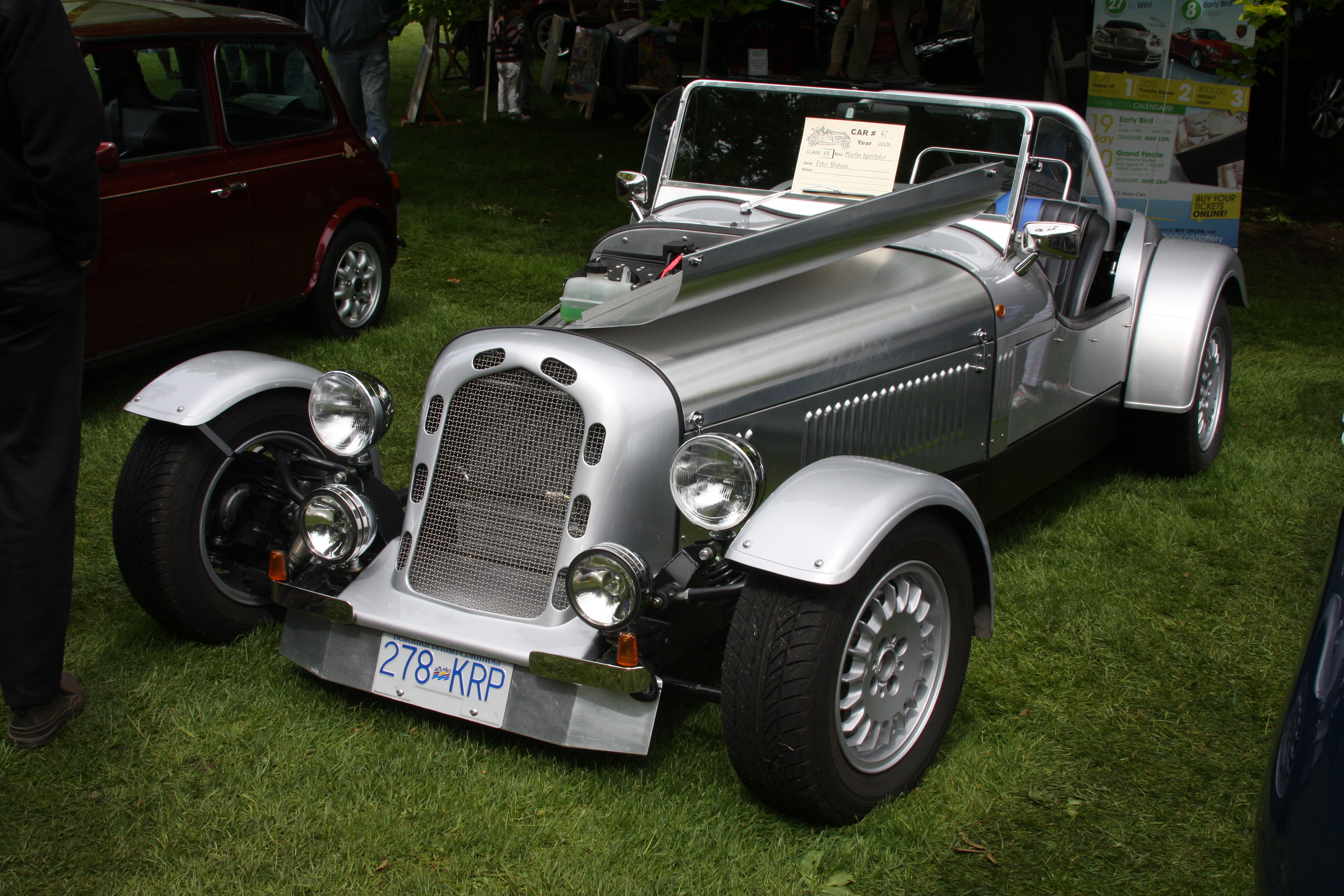

Body and chassis
- Body style: open two seat

Powertrain
- Engine: 2000 to 3500 cc BMW E36 I6
- Transmission: 5-speed manual

Dimensions
- Length: 3,650 mm (144 in)
- Width: 1,650 mm (65 in)
- Curb weight: 850 kg (typical)

Chronology
- Predecessor: Marlin Roadster

The Sportster was the last in the Roadster line, completely updated with a BMW E36 six cylinder engine as standard. It was available as a kit or fully built.

== 5EXi ==
5EXi
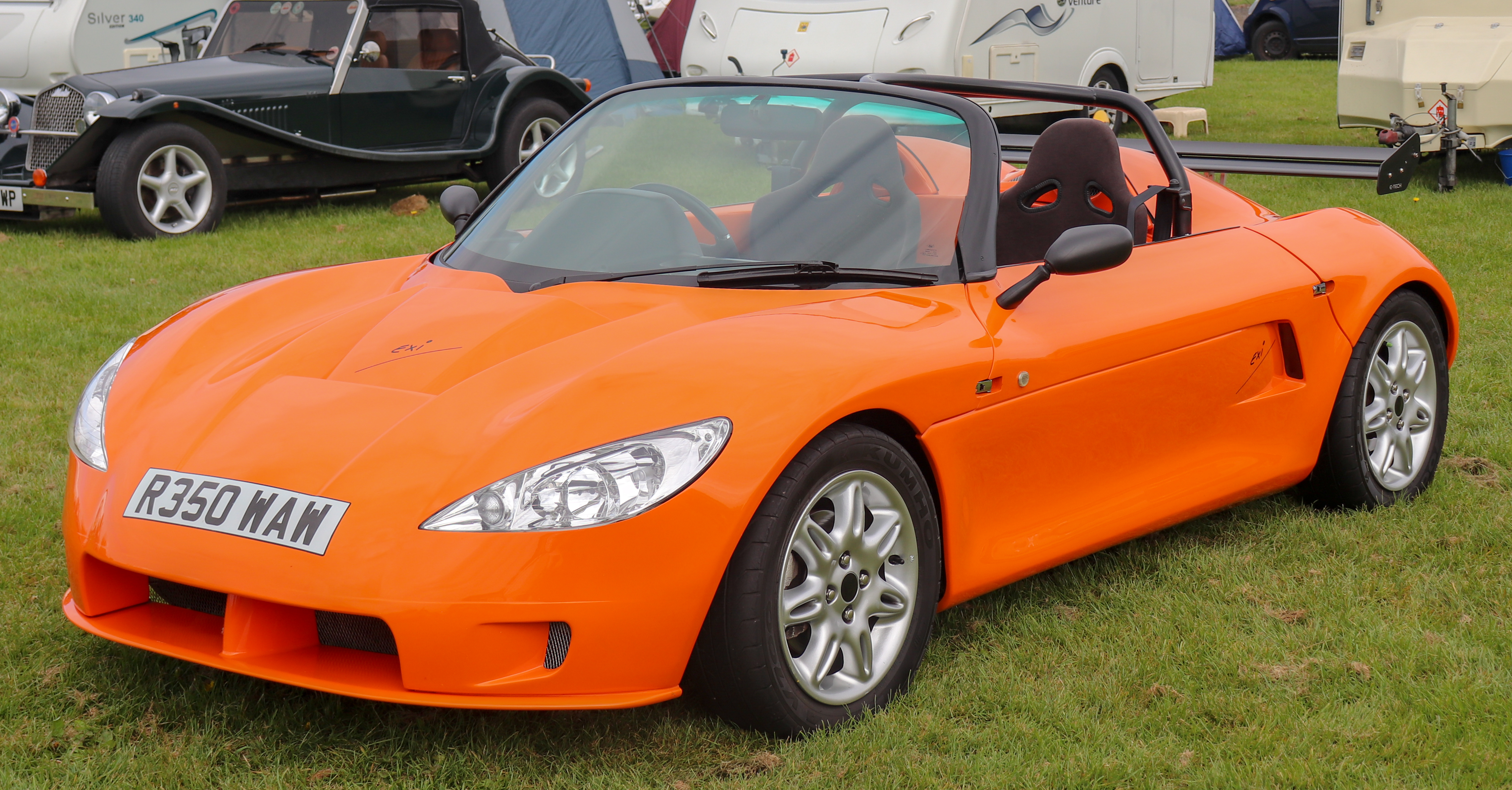

Body and chassis
- Body style: open two seat

Powertrain
- Engine: Honda B1.6, 1.8 or K20 Vtec Civic engine Rover K-series 1.1 to 1.8 L Rover T-series Tomcat engine 2.0 L Turbo, Audi 1.8T
- Transmission: 5-speed manual, 6-speed manual

Dimensions
- Length: 3,550 mm (140 in)
- Width: 1,690 mm (67 in)
- Curb weight: 650 kg (typical)

As a complete change from the retro looks of the previous models, the 5EXi is a modern two seat, mid engined sports car using Honda Civic, Rover K-series engines or Audi 1.8T engine . The car is built up around a space frame on which are fastened glass fibre body panels.

It is available as a kit or fully built. It is claimed by the factory that the kit can be assembled in around 120 hours.

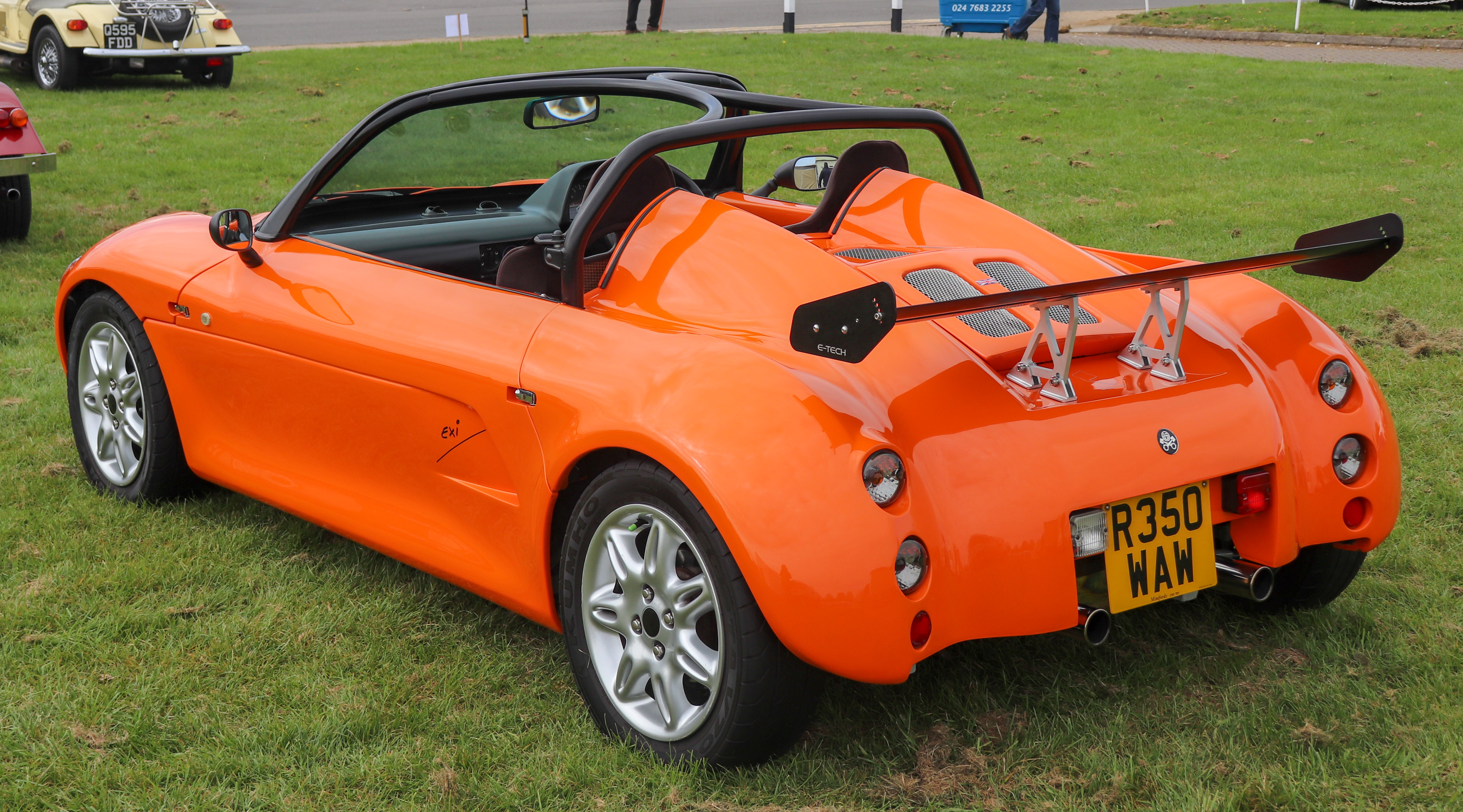
Rear
