= Gentry Cars =

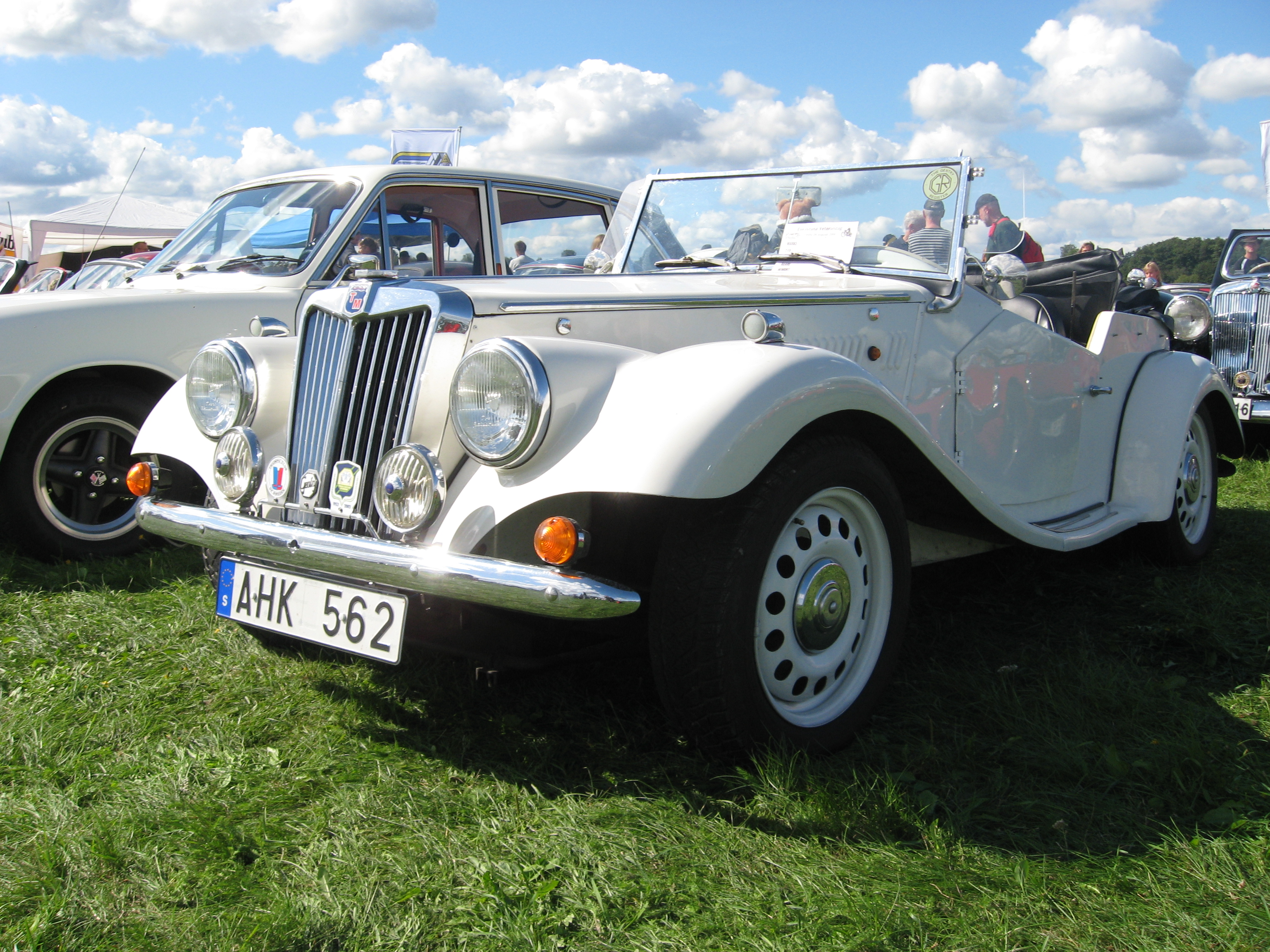
RMB Gentry

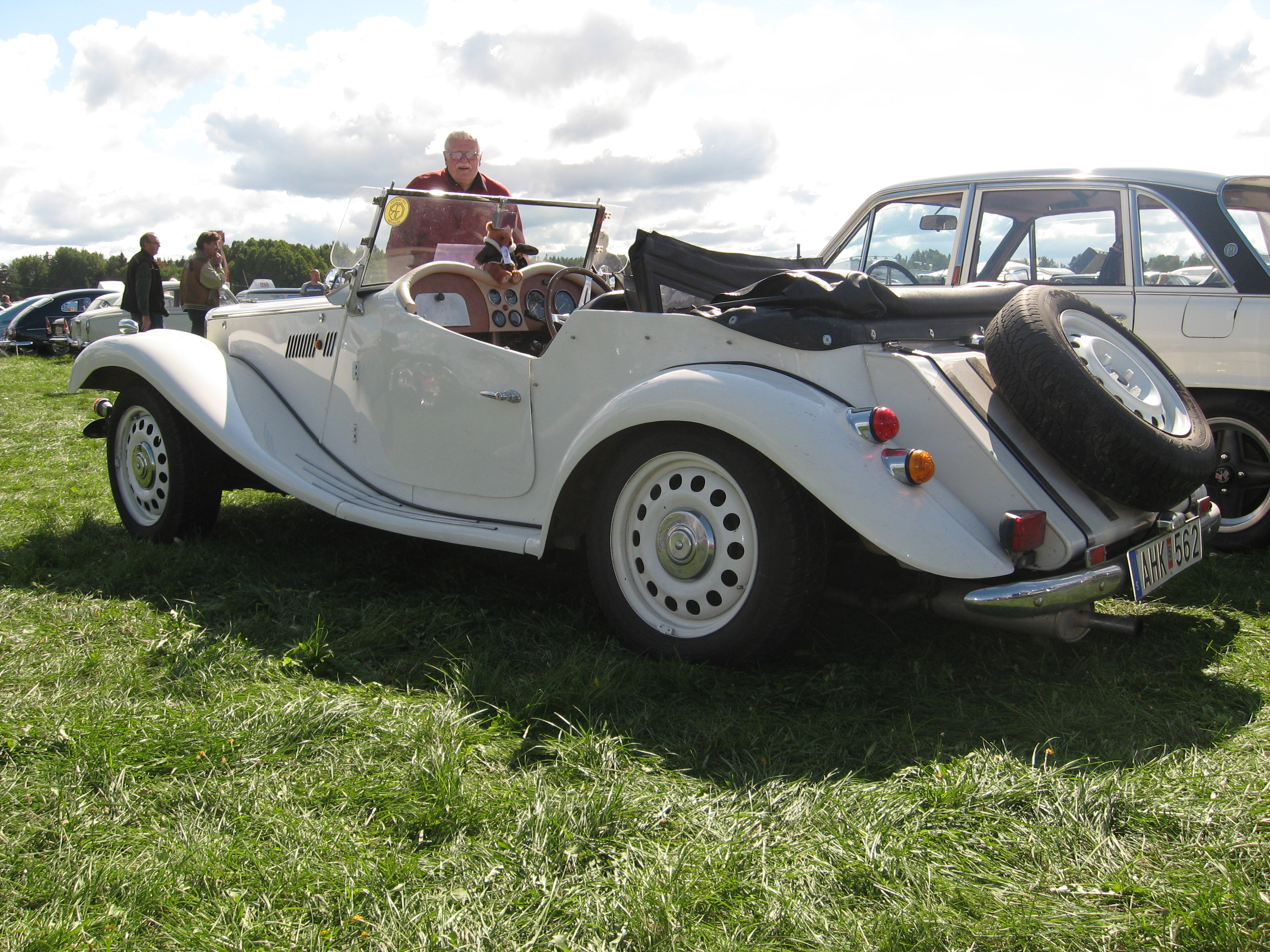
rear view

The Gentry is a British kit car styled to resemble a MG TF. It was offered for sale to the public by RMB Motors of Barwell, Leicestershire from 1974, the original prototype having been completed at the end of 1973. 15 kits were supplied in this first year, rising to over 80 per year produced in 1979.

The company was formed by Roger Blockley who had worked for the Triumph Car Company. The car was built on the chassis of a Triumph Herald using an angle iron framework which supported aluminum over marine ply body tub panels, aluminum bonnet, engine bay sides and 'fuel tank', with fibreglass wings and doors. The radiator grille was frequently sourced from an MG Magnette ZA/ZB. From 1975 a version was made to fit the Triumph Spitfire chassis and running gear, but only 2 of this variant were ever produced.

The rights to the car were sold in 1989 to S.P. Motors founded by Gentry owners, Mick Sinclair and Terry Phillips and they developed a Ford-based version of the car. Mick Sinclair left the company in 1997 and the name changed to TP Motors who modified the design to take parts from the Ford Sierra. In 2001 the factory unit was sold and the company closed selling the design in 2002 to the Vintage Motor Car Company based in Doncaster, Yorkshire but few if any cars were made. In 2008 the design moved to new owners Geoff and Ellen Beston who formed the Gentry Car Company based in Nuneaton and restarted production.

The company and all rights were sold on again in early 2019 and The Gentry Motor Car Company Ltd was reformed. The Gentry is back in production and the new owners, based in Coventry, are actively looking at additional engine options to complement the original whilst maintaining the MG / Triumph heritage.

2023 marks the 50th anniversary of the car.

RMB also made an Austin-Healey 100 replica in the 1980s based on MG MGB parts.
