= Alternative Cars =

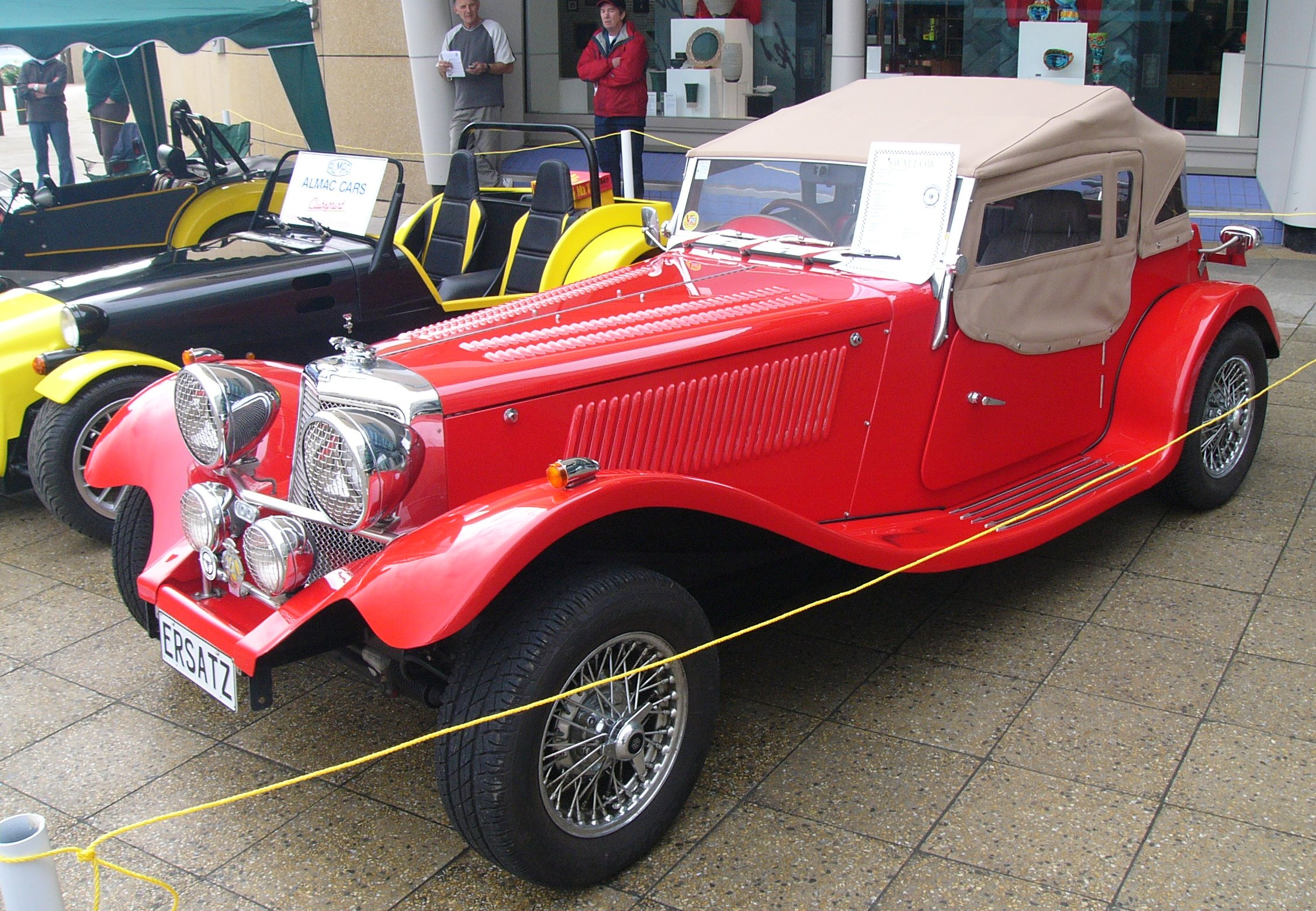
Swallow 100

Alternative Cars Limited is a New Zealand-based kit car company that manufactures fiber-glass bodied cars based on the 1950s MG TF. The company was founded by Russell Hooper, a medical supply representative, as Kit Kars Limited in 1984. In 1996 Kit Kars Ltd changed its name to Alternative Cars Limited. Initially the company operated from the owner's home, until moving to a small 600 square foot workshop in Auckland.

== Background ==
In the early 1980s Hooper decided to build his own MG TF using a Triumph Herald chassis. Many kit car companies in the United Kingdom were using the Herald as a donor vehicle because it provided all the mechanical parts required. By 1983 the car was completed and shown at the Auckland Motor Show. Enough interest was generated to indicate demand for the vehicle in kit form. In 1984 Hooper commenced production, trading as Kit Cars Limited. Warwick Tweedy also joined at this time to assist in the marketing and development of the car. Tweedy left the company 1997.

Alex Rohde, who had developed the one piece body mould for the T Mark 2 was contracted and consulted from 1997 to make all the steel work for the T car including the steel/brass grilles. His company was Multicraft Services Ltd, later known as Rohde Engineering. Jim Woonton was the upholsterer for most of the cars.

Prior to 1992 the company had used various fiber-glass laminating companies. From 1992 it created AC Fiberglass with one person was operating in a 1200 square feet of factory. By 1996 the company had grown to 11 staff and 12000 sq feet of factory space.

== Overseas markets ==
In the late 1980s Hooper decided that the local market was too small for future growth and decided to develop a chassis and redesigned car for the Australian market. Richard Wong, a consultant design engineer was employed to design the items required by the Australian Design Rule specifications. Walter Wing replaced him.

In 1996 the T Mark 5 was sent to Australia. Bill Walters was appointed the Australian distributor. In 2001 to meet Australian compliance issues the motor upgraded to an injected motor from the Mazda MX5. It was launched at the 2001 National motor Show. In 2002 Daryl Swaine took over the Australian distributorship and retained the name Alternative Cars Australia Pty Ltd. Swaine also rented out two Mark 5 T Cars, his own white one and the demonstrator from New Zealand.

By 2000 Hooper decided to develop a model for left hand drive markets, primarily the United States. The model was designed around a Mazda MX5 donor car. At the 2002 Carlisle Kit Car Show in Pennsylvania Hooper obtained a commitment from an interested party to being an agent and the option to show the model at Knotts Berry Farm Kit Car Show in April 2003. Rohde lead the development team and the car was shipped on the 3 March 2003. It won the Peoples Choice trophy at Knotts Berry Farm and was shown at the Carlisle National Kit Car Show in Pennsylvania.

TGs are currently sold in the United States, Canada, United Kingdom (Alternative Cars (International) Limited), and Australia.

== Models ==
=== T cars ===
- Mark 1 (1983–1985) Triumph Herald chassis and mechanical parts, plywood floor and firewall, fibreglass grille with rod bars, and a tub made up of 5 panels. Nineteen were made.
- Mark 1A (1985–?) one piece body tub developed by Alex Rohde but retained the old grille shape. Six were made.
- Mark 2 (?) a one piece tub with its floor and firewall, TF grille shape.
- Mark 3 to 4 (? – 1991) a total of 191 Mark 2 to 4's were made

During the model's life the grille was modified from the Mark 1 to a fiberglass replica of the TF, then ABS plastic, steel, and eventually brass. Chrome plating the grille was only successful on the later two. All the Mark 1 to 4 T cars had a Triumph Herald chassis with either Triumph Herald motor, or Nissan A series 1200, 1400, or 1500 cc motors with a 4- or 5-speed gearbox.

- Mark 5 (1991– ) Custom made chassis with Nissan Z series 1800 or 2000 cc motor. It had Vauxhall Viva or Holden 4-cylinder Torana (LC or LJ) front and rear suspension. The last model of the Mark 5 had a Mazda MX5 1600cc motor and gearbox. 55 made.
- Mark 5A 21 were made
- Mark 5L 2 were made

=== Swallow 100 (1993–2003) ===
- Mark 1 (1993–?) The first Swallow, a Jaguar SS100 replica kit car, was built by Doug St George in 1993. Not wanting to wait for the final development of the car St George researched and searched for the parts to make it work. The company demonstrator was the second built in 1994. 10 were made.
- Mark 2 (?-2004) New boot shape. Four were made.

=== TG Sports 1955 (aka T Mark 6) (2003–present) ===
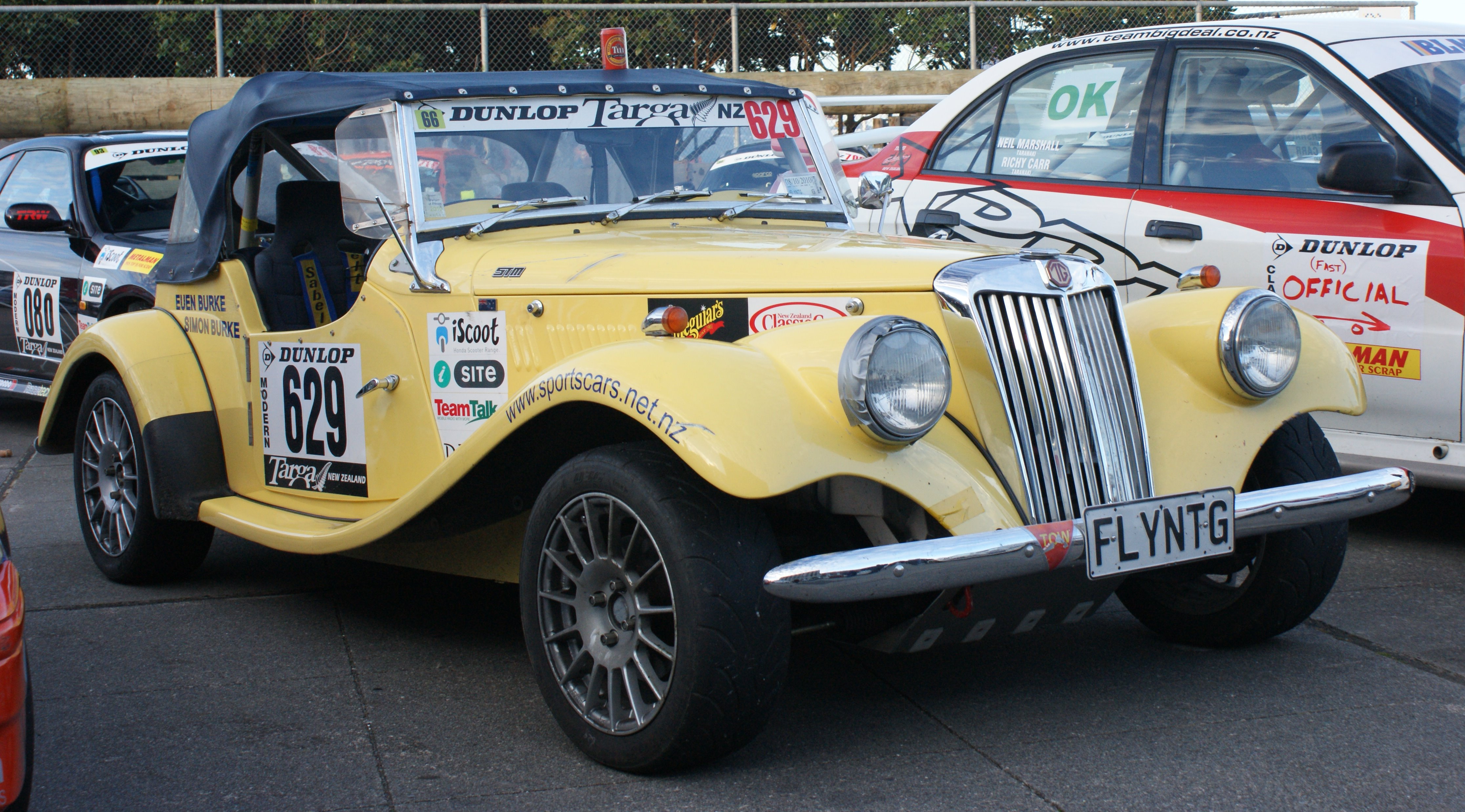
TG Sports

- Mazda Miata MX5 mechanicals including the motor & gearbox. Still currently in production. Seventeen had been made up to 2008.

The TG Sports 1955 is a semi-built or turnkey minus vehicle aimed at the export markets. It was named TG because in 2002 MG launched a new TF. The car is delivered in a completely built up state and driveable within days of receipt. All that had to be added was the Mazda MX5 mechanicals thus significantly reducing assembly time.

=== XK 130 ===
In 2006 Hooper built a replica of a 1954 Jaguar XK140. This was powered by a Nissan 280Z motor and used Holden Torana suspension. The car was called the XK130 as it was a mixture of XK120 and XK140 features.
