= Spartan Cars =

Defunct kit car manufacturer

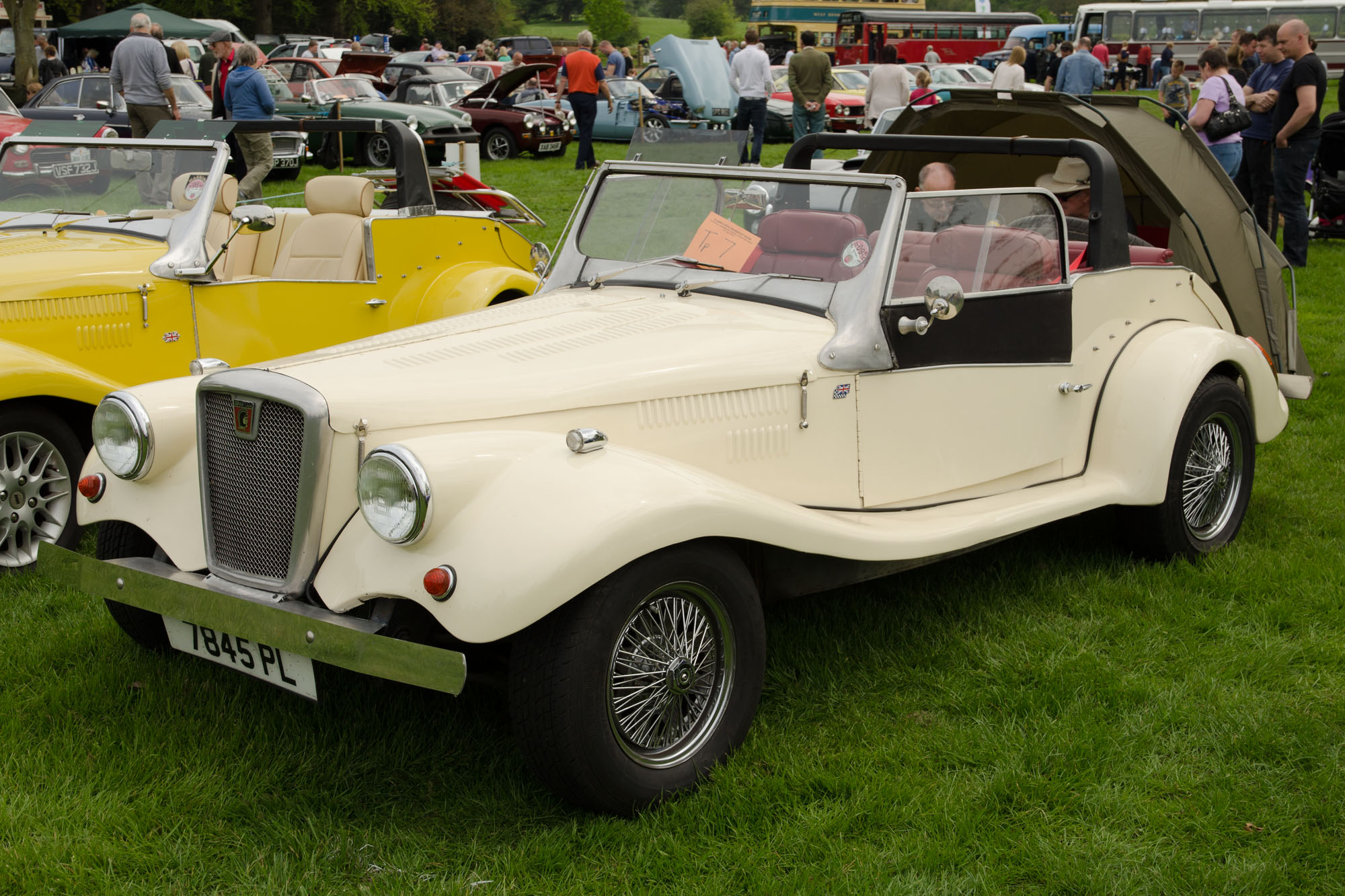
- The Spartan Roadster
- Industry: automotive
- Founded: 1973
- Founder: Jim McIntyre
- Defunct: 1995
- Headquarters: Pinxton, Derbyshire, United Kingdom
- Key people: Steve Beardsall

Spartan Cars was a manufacturer of kit cars which operated from 1973 to 1995 initially based in Mapperley Plains, Nottingham moving in 1978 to Pinxton, Derbyshire, United Kingdom. The company was founded by Jim McIntyre, who had been running a vehicle repair business in Nottingham. The name was not a reference to the Spartan fighters, so much as a tongue-in-cheek reference to the economic conditions in the United Kingdom at the time the company was first formed.

Steve Beardsall, who had been the production manager, took over in about 1991 and oversaw the introduction of the Treka model.

Over 4000 kits were produced and they have been exported to over 23 countries.

== Spartan vehicles ==
Launched in 1973 the company's initial product was an open, two-seater, traditionally styled kit car based at first on the chassis and mechanical components of the Triumph Herald and engine from the Triumph Spitfire. A basic kit cost £250. The kit comprised aluminium body panels to be fitted over a steel tube frame and glass fibre wings completed the car. Amongst other parts, early cars needed to source bumpers from a Hillman Avenger and a radiator grille from a Wolseley 18/85.

At the Custom Car show in London in December 1975 a road-ready car was shown priced at £2365 but none were sold at that time.

A 2+2 version on a 6 inches (150 mm) longer wheelbase was added in 1976 and other engine options were offered. This necessitated the production of an in-house chassis, a significant development for the small company. The Spartan's top was of canvas, stretched over a simple tubular frame.

In 1977, as the Triumphs became rarer and collectible in their own right, work started on designing a complete new, bespoke chassis utilizing components from the Ford Cortina Mk III-V. It entered the market in 1980. The new model has a re-designed rear end, less square than the original version, and is called the Spartan Mk II. The resulting trunk space was ample for this type of car. Taillights came from either the BMC ADO16 family or from the Ford Anglia 105E (mounted upside down). The new chassis mounted the engine 6 inches (150 mm) further back than in the Cortina donor for better weight distribution, it is 6 inches (150 mm) wider and 12 inches (300 mm) longer than the original. The kit included the aluminum chassis, dashboard, body parts including doors and wings, and upholstery. It also included a propshaft, as the wheelbase was much shorter than that of the donor Cortina. In early 1992, a Dutch importer once again picked up sales of the car, which had been imported in the latter half of the 1970s by Nova Import Nederland, who had developed a Dutch language instruction manual for the Mk I. By this time, the Spartan utilized numerous Ford Sierra components. Cars sold in continental Europe also depended on Ford Taunus rather than Cortina parts. In addition to kits, the Dutch importer also offered a fully built up model.

=== Other products ===
A separate company, "Sherwood Universal Vehicles", was formed in 1984 to make the Sherwood which was an estate car conversion based around the Ford Cortina MkIV but using a new chassis. The rear roof section was detachable to make the car into a pick-up. 110 kits were sold.

More unusual was the Starcraft, a six-wheel motor caravan conversion for the Ford Cortina Mk III to V. A new steel chassis took the Cortina's mechanical components and on this was mounted a large body shell which included an overhanging section above the driver and passenger seats. The bonnet area and doors were restyled and the centre section of the Cortina was retained including wiring, instruments and windscreen. Only one of the rear axles was driven. The caravan interior fittings and design was left up to the customer. Later versions were built on Ford Sierra donor cars. The kits were initially priced at £1995 and around 200 were sold.

The Treka was a Jeep style car with aluminium panels over a tubular steel frame and was based on the Ford Fiesta Mk2.

The final car was the Bandit, a hot rod with glass fibre panels on a ladder type chassis. It used a Ford Cortina as a donor car. At least 3 were made.

Models	Type	Years of production
Roadster		1973-1995
Sherwood	estate car	1984-1992
Starcraft	motor caravan	1986-1992
Treka	Jeep	1990-1995
Bandit	Hot rod	

== Gallery ==
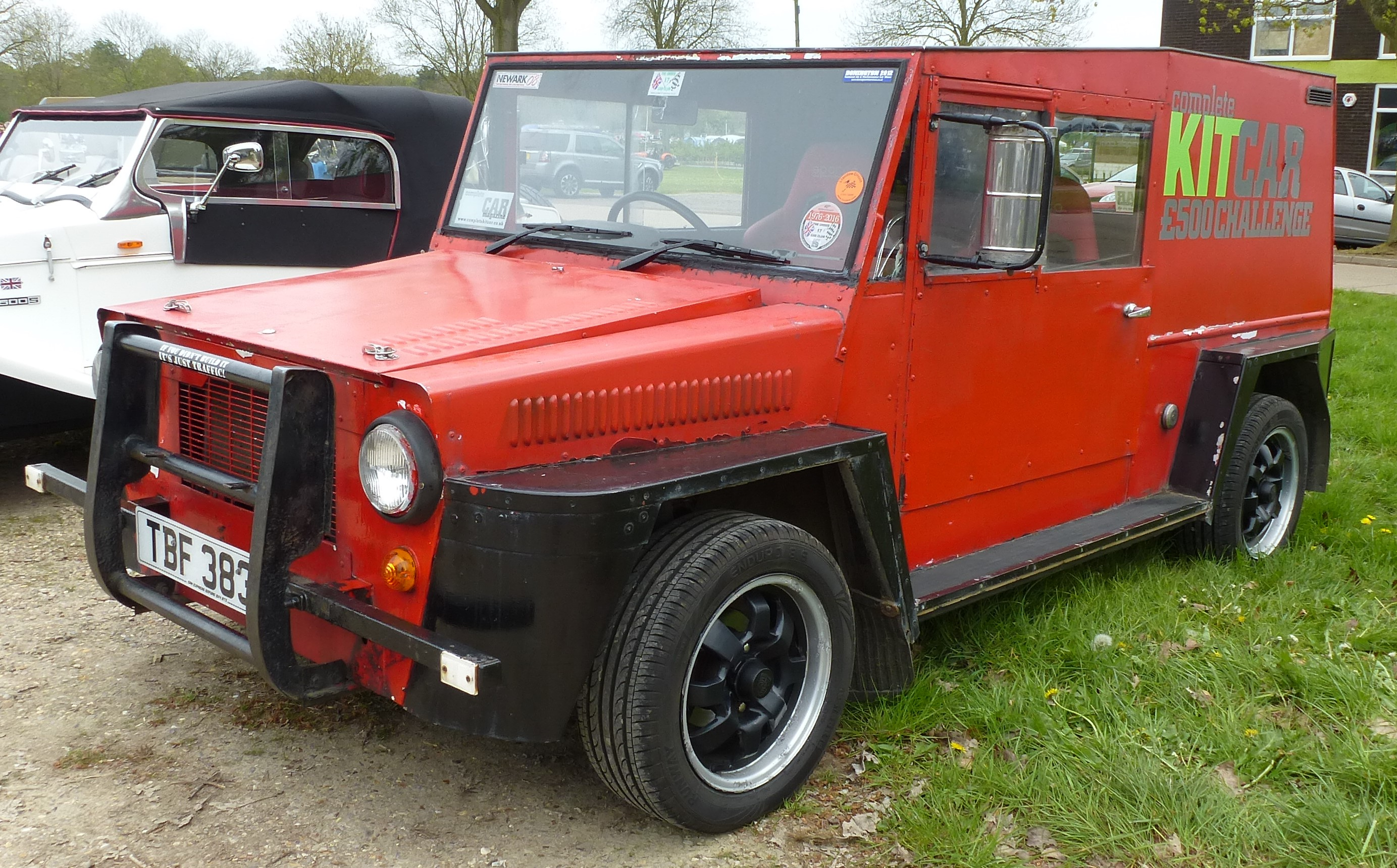
Spartan Treka

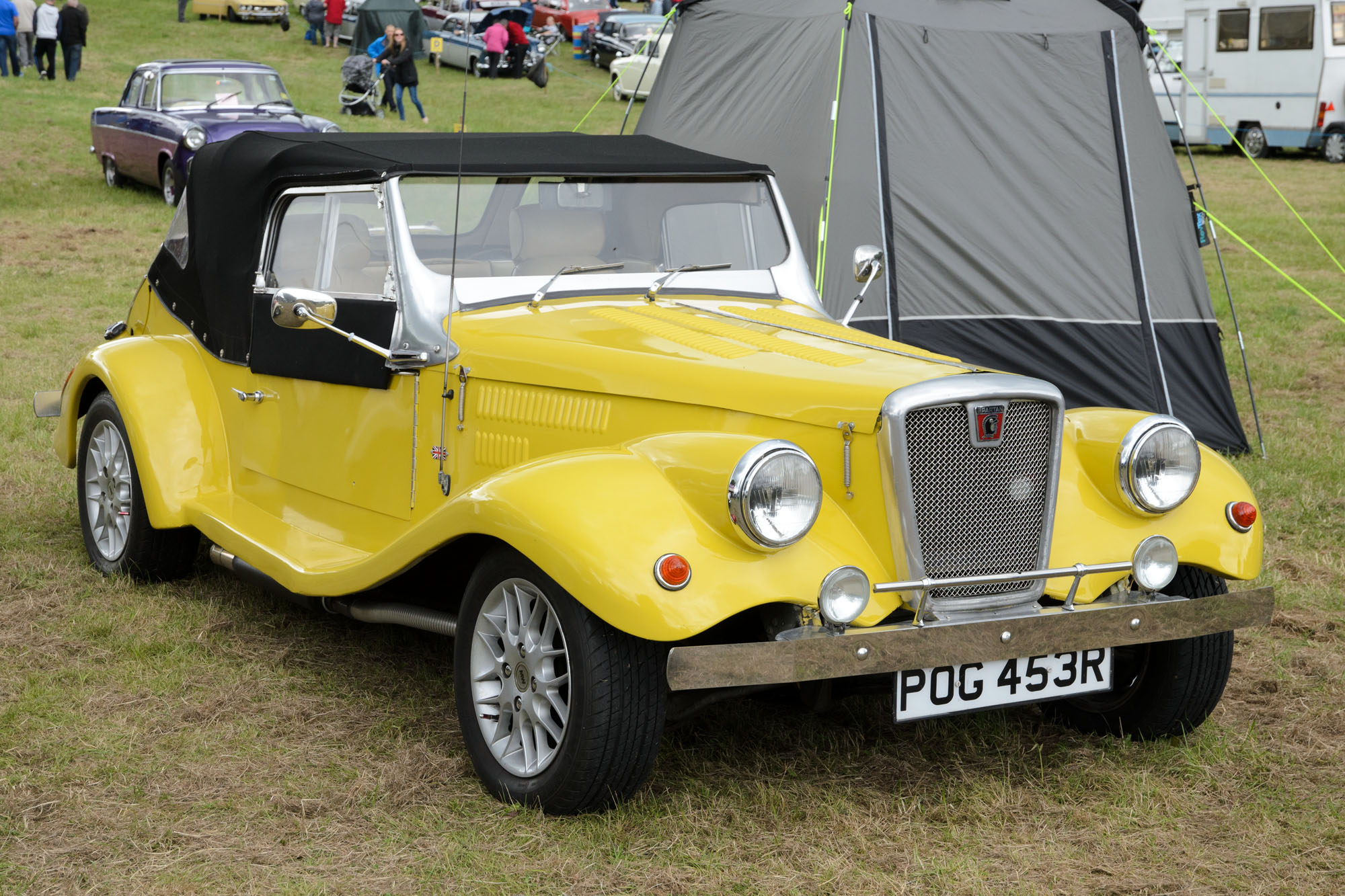
1977 Spartan Roadster

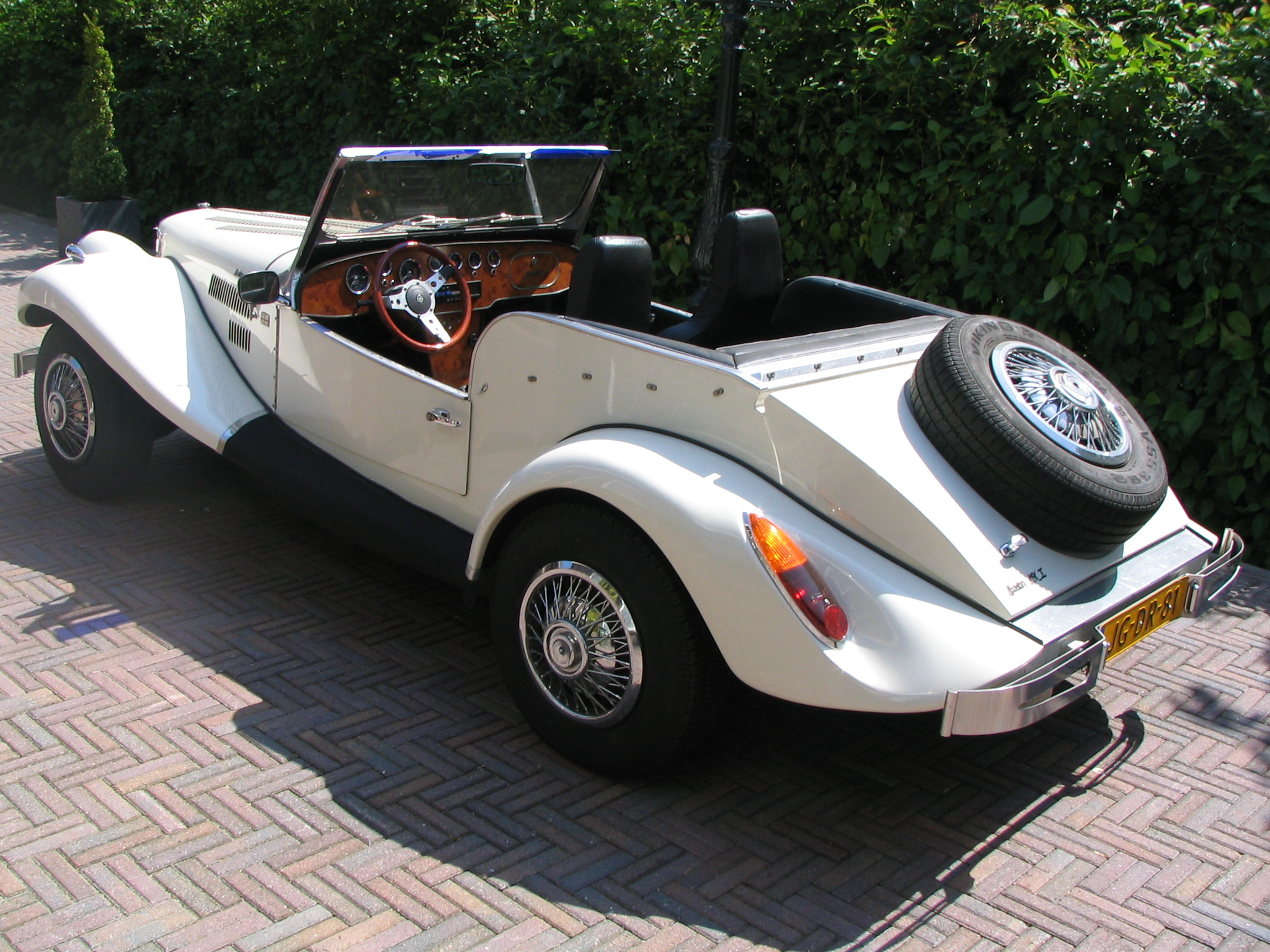
Spartan Mark II Roadster, rear (Ford-based)
