= Fiberfab Avenger GT =

Avenger GT
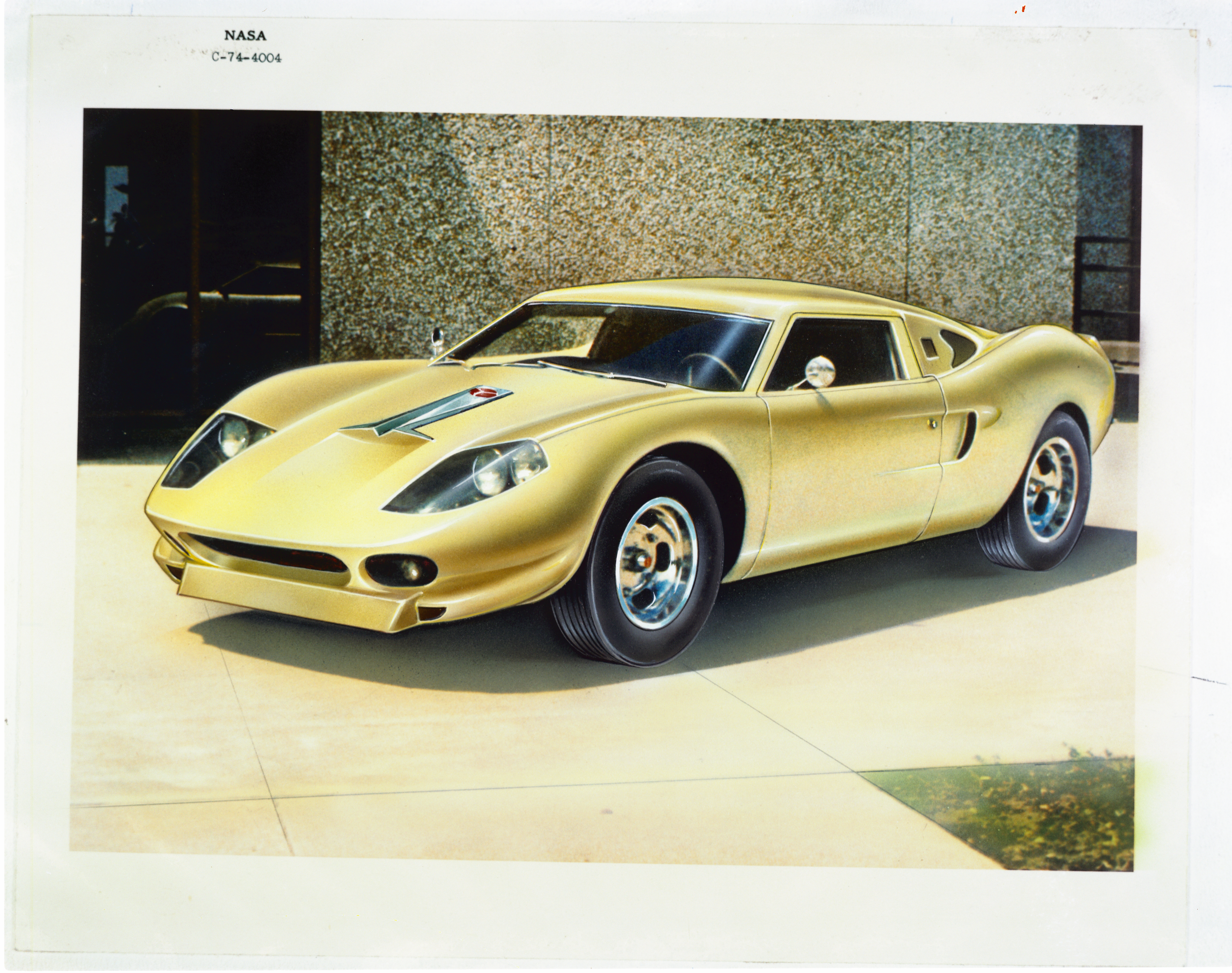

Overview
- Manufacturer: Fiberfab
- Production: 1966–1978

Body and chassis
- Body style: Coupe
- Layout: R/R

Chronology
- Predecessor: Aztec

The Avenger GT was a kit car produced by Fiberfab. It was designed in California and manufactured in the United States and Canada for 12 years, from late 1966 until 1978.

== History ==
The Avenger GT was the successor to the Aztec in Fiberfab's lineup. Some of the company's early documentation refers to it as the Aztec Avenger GT. The Avenger GT's styling recalls the Ford GT40 — the Mk.I and Mk.III GT40s in particular — but is not an exact copy of the racing car. It was a less expensive alternative to the Fiberfab Valkyrie, which looked like an Avenger GT with a short rear deck and had a custom chassis with room for a mid-mounted V8 engine.

Fiberfab started producing Avenger GT kits in Sunnyvale, California in Santa Clara County in 1966. They moved to Fremont, California in 1967. They also had a facility in Bridgeville, PA to supply demand on the East coast.

A separate company called Fiberfab Canada Limited (FCL) was incorporated in Canada and after 1970 began producing long door Avenger GT kits in a facility in Dauphin, Manitoba. This operation relocated to Winnipeg, Manitoba in 1971, and then to Ontario in 1974.

Production of Avenger GTs ended in 1978. The total number of kits made was in the thousands.

== Features ==
Instead of the two single lamps fitted to the Aztec, the Avenger GT was equipped with quad headlamps. The Avenger GT's tail section was longer than the Valkyrie's so that it could cover the car's rear-mounted engine, giving it an appearance closer to that of a GT40 Mk.III.

The Avenger GT's windshield is the standard unit from a second generation (1965–69) Chevy Corvair, while the backlight is from a 1965 or 1966 Ford Mustang 2+2 Fastback.

There were several options for side windows. The original Fiberfab manuals described an arrangement that used a wind-wing from a 1965 Mustang in combination with door glass from a 1966 Ford LTD and a regulator from a VW Karman Ghia. Another option used a custom single piece glass side window supplied by Fiberfab, but the original molds for this were lost. Side windows from Plexiglass or Lexan were special order items.

There are long door cars and short door cars. The short door cars were built prior to 1970, and have a rocker panel below the door edge. The long door reaches all the way to the bottom of the car body and is a bit wider.

The earliest models could be ordered with or without the GT40 style twin hood scoops.

The choice of taillamps was left up to the builder, some of whom used early Mustang or Maverick units.

== Avenger GT-12 and GT-15 ==
The Avenger GT line included two models: the Avenger GT-12, and the Avenger GT-15.

The GT-12 was designed to be built on a Volkswagen Type 1 backbone chassis from a Volkswagen Beetle or Karmann Ghia, adjusted for width as necessary. With the chassis came the donor VW's front suspension of upper and lower trailing arms, torsion leaf springs and telescopic shock absorbers, and rear suspension of swing axle or semi-trailing arms, torsion bars and telescopic shocks. The donor car's original 4-speed transaxle and four cylinder Volkswagen air-cooled engine could be kept, but other options, including Porsche or Corvair engines, could be substituted. At roughly 1,500 lb (680.4 kg), the GT-12 weighed approximately 500 lb (226.8 kg) less than a standard Beetle.

The GT-15 was similar in appearance to the GT-12, but included a custom chassis designed to accept suspension and drive-train components from a Chevrolet Corvair. Installing a Corvair front sub-frame put upper and lower A-arms with coil springs and telescopic shocks in front, with or without an Anti-roll bar. At the rear was a semi-trailing arm suspension with coil springs and telescopic shocks. The default rear-mounted Chevrolet Turbo-Air 6 engine provided power through a 3 or 4-speed manual Chevrolet transaxle.

== Avenger GT-12X and GT-15X ==
Later models of the Avenger GT were designated with an X and received minor body revisions. These usually included long-style doors, flared wheel arches, and a front spoiler.

== NASA Battery-electric vehicle ==
To test electric vehicle propulsion systems using a special dynamometer called the "Road Load Simulator" (RLS), NASA commissioned construction of a special vehicle that was designed from the outset as an electric vehicle. A custom ladder chassis with outriggers was built by "Electric Vehicle Engineering Co." (EVE) of Boston, Massachusetts. Configured for front wheel drive, the car's running gear was from Saab. The body was a Fiberfab shell, and appears to have been an Avenger GT.

== Gallery ==
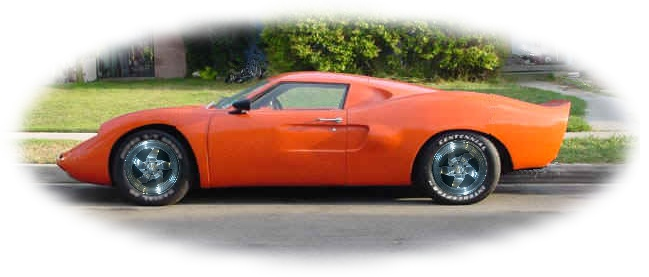
Side view of Avenger GT-12

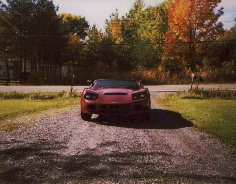
Front view of Avenger GT-12

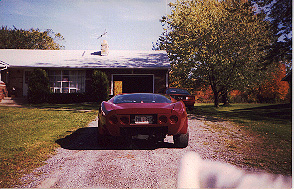
Rear view of Avenger GT-12

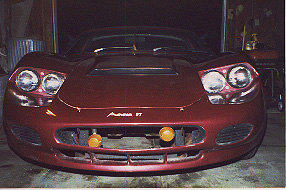
Close-up view of Avenger GT-12
