= Fiberfab Valkyrie =

Valkyrie
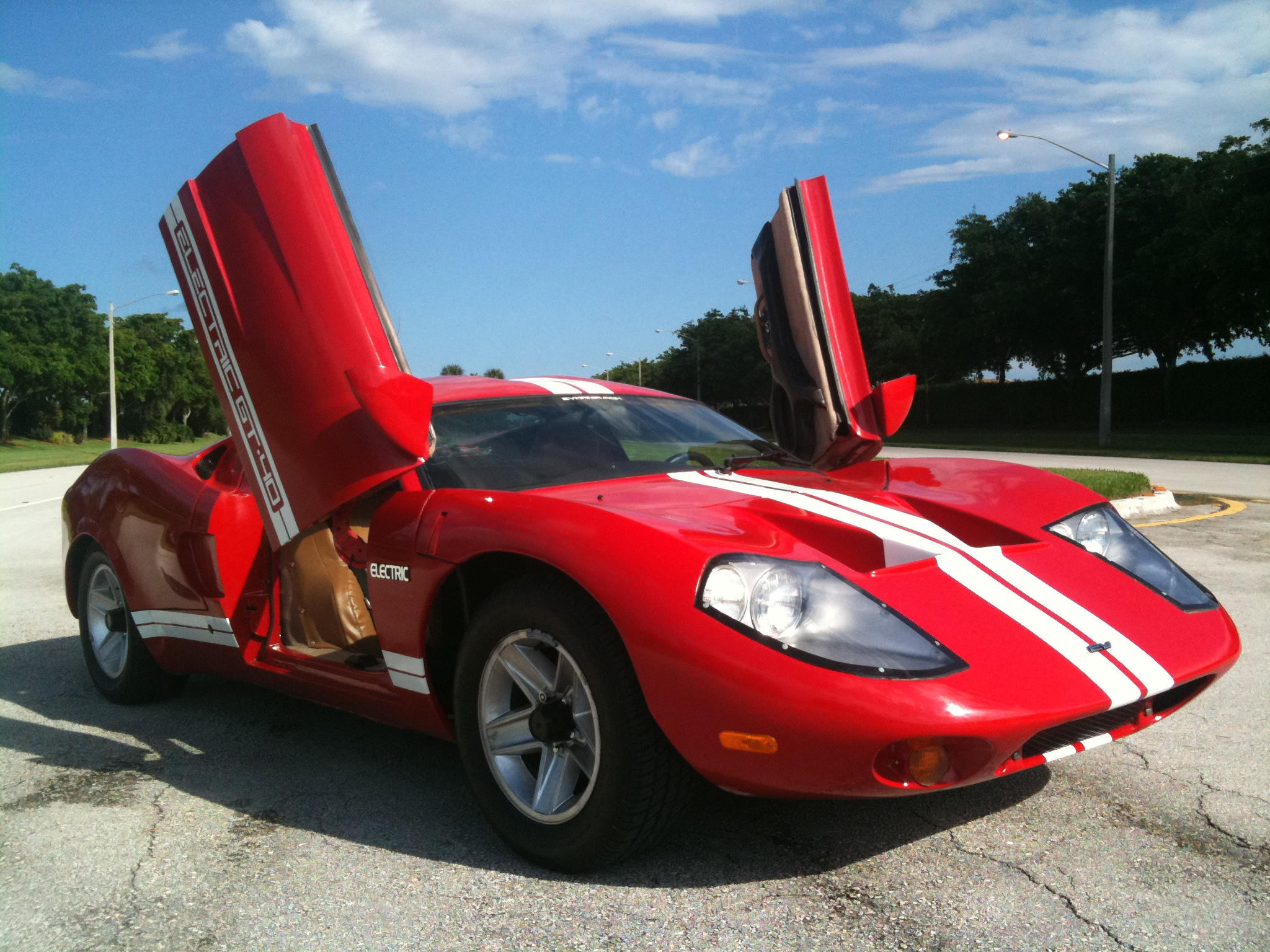
- Customized electric Valkyrie

Overview
- Manufacturer: Fiberfab

Body and chassis
- Class: Sportscar
- Body style: Coupe
- Layout: M/R
- Platform: Custom
- Related: Fiberfab Avenger GT

Chronology
- Predecessor: Aztec

The Valkyrie is a GT sports car introduced in 1966 by the Fiberfab company. The Valkyrie's styling was inspired by the lines of the Ford GT40.

== History ==
The Valkyrie was launched in the fall of 1966. It was the first model that Fiberfab offered either as a fully-assembled, turn-key car named the Valkyrie 500 GT, or in kit form as the Valkyrie kit. The price difference between the two was significant — the 500 GT listed for $12,500.00 and the kit for $1495.00. Most Valkyries were owner-built.

Shortly after releasing the Valkyrie, Fiberfab announced a similarly styled, less expensive rear-engined model called the Fiberfab Avenger GT.

The Valkyrie won third place in the prototype section of the 1967 New York International Sports Car Show. Don Sherman, automotive journalist and editor of Car and Driver magazine from 1985 to 1988, owned and built one in the late 1960s.

In 1971 a revised model of the Valkyrie kit was released named the Valkyrie GT-X. The new version used a one-piece body molding instead of the earlier two-piece assembly, and included minor styling revisions like replacing the rear glass with louvers, along with other changes meant to simplify assembly. The wheelbase of the GT-X was longer than the earlier car, resulting in 4 in (102 mm) more interior length.

When the Classic Motor Carriages company bought Fiberfab Inc., they acquired the rights and molds for all of Fiberfab's products except the Valkyrie. The car continued in production in very limited numbers.

In 2003 production of the Valkyrie was restarted by Factory Fiberfab US. Their revival of the Valkyrie body was made from the early two-piece body molds. While the body was original, many upgrades were made to the mechanical aspects of the car. Two versions of the Valkyrie chassis were offered; the GEN 1, and the revised GEN 2 that included a new rear suspension system called "U.M.E.T.S.", for Unitized Multi-link Engine Transmission Suspension.

As of this writing a website for Factory Fiberfab US is still up, and is advertising the Valkyrie as available or soon to be, although the site has not been updated for several years.

== Features ==
Like the GT40 it resembles, the Valkyrie is a mid-engined, V8 powered coupe. It came with a custom steel chassis.

The factory-assembled 500 GT featured a leather-trimmed interior, a 5-speed ZF transaxle, 4 wheel Hurst/Airheart disc brakes, and a 427 cu in (7.0 L) big-block engine developing 500 hp (372.8 kW). This version came equipped with a Simpson drag parachute for use at speeds in excess of 140 mph (225 km/h).

For Valkyrie kits, the powertrain and running gear components were sourced by the car's builder, but the factory manual included suggestions.

Front suspension for both the turn-key and kit car was provided by using a complete front subframe from a Chevrolet Corvair. The steering box and linkage were also from a Corvair, as were many of the rear suspension components.

The factory suggested several options for the car's transaxle, including a Corvair 4-speed unit reversed for mid-engine installation, 5-speed or 6-speed units used in different Audi models, or a ZF 5-speed transaxle as used in the 500 GT for high-torque applications.

The kit's manual suggested using a 283 or 327 cu in (4.6 or 5.4 L) Chevrolet small-block engine, but a 289 cu in (4.7 L) Ford Windsor engine could be used with a special bell-housing adapter.

The car's radiator was an aluminum unit that could be sourced from a Corvette. Other pieces to complete the car came from GM, Chevrolet, Pontiac, Ford, and others.

== Noteworthy cars ==
=== EVGT-40 ===
The EVGT-40 is a Fiberfab Valkyrie converted to electric power by Andrew McClary.
