= John Chun =

Korean automotive engineering designer

John M. Chun (Korean: 전명준; August 3, 1928 – July 6, 2013) was a Korean automotive engineering designer. He was the first known Korean car designer.

Chun was born in Korea, Empire of Japan, in what is now the North Korean coastal region of Hungnam. In 1953, he moved to South Korea as active fighting ended during the Korean War. He immigrated to the United States in 1957, after a friend had already moved to the U.S., settling in Sacramento, California. He held a mechanical engineering degree from a university in Korea, but the degree was not useful in the American job market and had to start over. Chun enrolled at Sacramento Junior College, where a professor insisted that he apply to the Art Center College of Design (ACCD) in Pasadena, California. He worked full-time as a mechanic while studying at ACCD. Chun received his bachelor's degree in industrial design, with a specialty in transportation design, after seven years, while working as a mechanic to pay for his classes.

In 1967, Chun would be hired by Fred Goodell upon graduation from Art Center, the then-chief engineer of Shelby American. Chun joined Shelby American in 1967, then designed the 1968 and 1969 Shelby Mustang Cobras, GT350, and GT500 models [as well as revamped the Cobra coil logo with more realistic details] (that is still used today).

The 1967 Shelby Mustang was in production by Chun's joining, as the Shelby Mustang had been designed by a Ford Motor Company designer by the name of Charles McHose in 1966 who left Shelby American. Chun then took over the project and contributed to the design of the 1968 model.

Once Shelby American dissolved at the LAX hangar, Chun eventually left the automotive industry after also working with Chrysler in Michigan and Blakely Auto Works, notably the Bearcat.

In 1975, Chun helped design a new car for Bradley Automotive that would be called the Bradley GT II.

Chun later consulted for Hyundai Motor Company. In April 1979, former chairman, Chung Se-Yung (Pony Chung) and two other executives visited Chun in Minnesota upon learning about a northern Korean automotive connection since the Chung's were also from the north. They never heard of the Shelby Mustang Cobra. Chun decided never to work with Koreans again once he found out they hired an Italian automotive designer instead of him. Not only did Hyundai spend millions of dollars on failed prototypes, but was ultimately wasted since they also failed every United States Department of Transportation test after hiring the Italian automotive designer. That designer did not understand American automotive standard protocols, therefore Hyundai automobiles were not able to enter the US market at the time due to the testing failures and launch delays.

When Chun moved to Minnesota in the early 1970s, he oversaw the design and creation of a new line of toy cars for Tonka Toys.

Since Tonka Toys in Mound, MN, desired a designer with an automotive design background, Chun was scouted and then settled in the Lake Minnetonka area of Minnesota. He designed a new line of steel toy cars for Tonka Toys.

After leaving Tonka Toys and other consultant product design projects with Lee Data, Whirlpool, 3M, etc., he owned and operated Chun Mee Restaurant in Delano, Minnesota, with his family from 1986 until he died in 2013.

John M. Chun died on July 6, 2013, at the age of 84. He was survived by his wife, Helen, and children, Marsha and Kevin.
