= Bradley Automotive =

Defunct American motor vehicle manufacturer

- Industry: Automotive
- Predecessor: Gary's Bug Shop
- Founder: Gary Courneya; David Bradley Fuller
- Fate: Bankruptcy
- Successor: Classic Electric Cars Corp. Electric Vehicle Corporation
- Headquarters: Plymouth, Minnesota, United States
- Products: Bradley GT, Bradley GT II
- Parent: Thor Corporation

Bradley Automotive was an American automotive company that built and sold kits and components for kit cars as well as completed vehicles. They were based in Plymouth, Minnesota. The company began selling kits in 1970 and ceased operations in 1981.

== Company history ==
In the late 1960s, Gary Courneya and David Bradley Fuller were introduced by a mutual friend. Fuller had been running a small fiberglass design company, and Courneya had earlier been in sales in Beverly Hills, California. The two partnered in a business, Gary's Bug Shop, which produced parts and kits for the dune buggy market. Fuller designed the bodies, and Courneya handled sales.

Period advertising copy for Gary's Bug Shop lists a variety of different models already bearing the Bradley name, including the Bradley "T" Roadster, the Bradley Bandit and the Bradley Baron. This last model was a dune buggy with a hardtop and gull wing side panels. Also mentioned was a forthcoming Bradley Elan GT.

Bradley Automotive began selling its first product, the Bradley GT, in 1970. Like the earlier products of Gary's Bug Shop, the car was built on the chassis of the original Volkswagen Beetle. Interest in the new GT was generated by advertising widely in a broad range of popular magazines. Anyone wanting more information was asked to send US$1 to the company for a brochure. When this promotion began, neither the brochures nor car existed.

The partners raised capital by offering 80,000 shares in the new company for sale at US$1 each. Half of the shares were quickly bought by the vice-president of a local construction firm, while the balance was sold over the next six months.

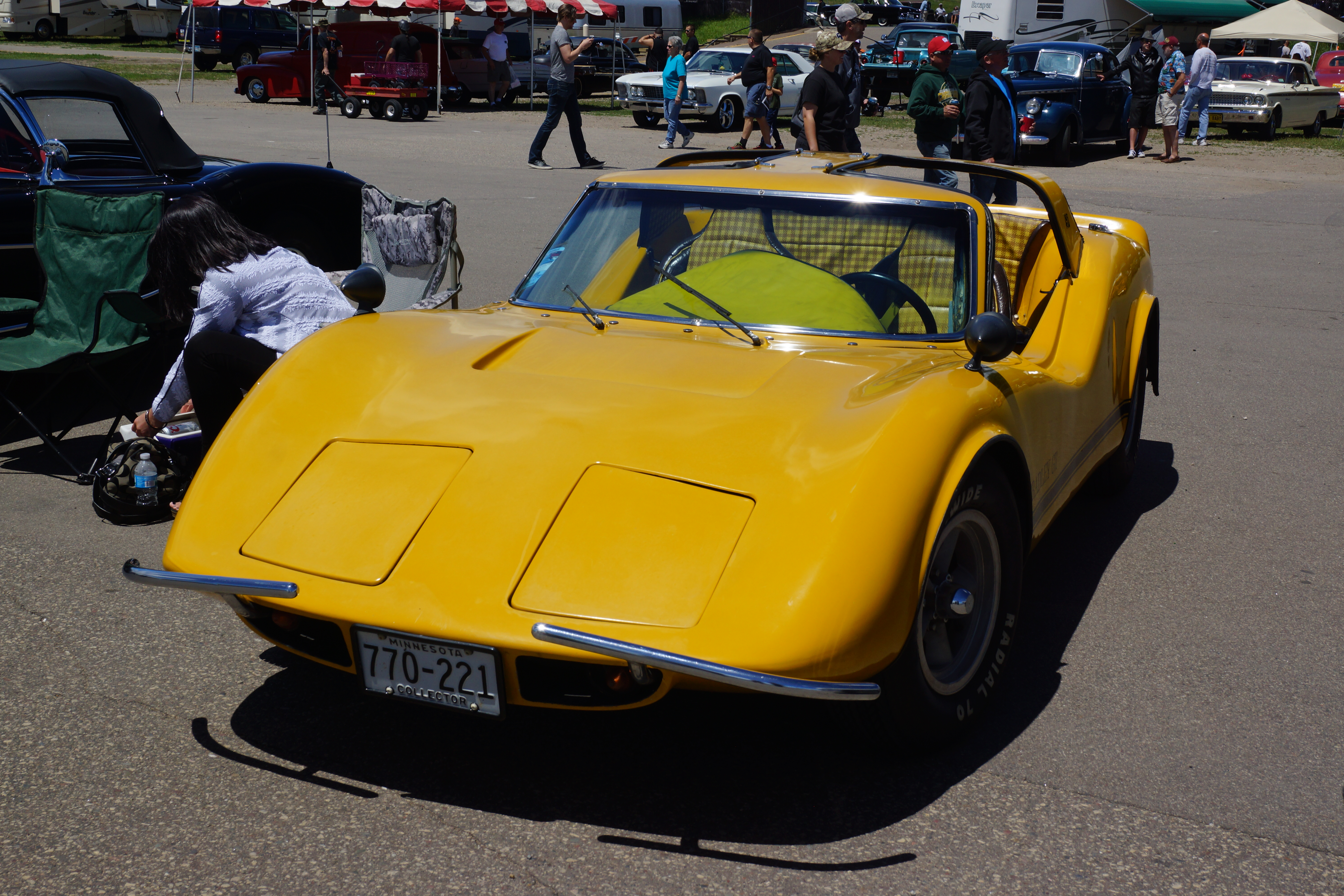
Bradley GT

To accelerate sales, Courneya began telephoning sales leads obtained from the write-ins directly. During these calls he also began using the name "Gary Bradley", a fictional character whose name was the combination of Courneya's first name and Fuller's middle name. The fictive "Gary Bradley" was even referred to as the company's founder and president, and his signature appeared on some company legal documents. Appearances by "Gary Bradley" were actually Courneya.

By 1973, the company was in need of another infusion of capital. One of the original investors agreed to put another US$90,000 into the company on the condition that a professional manager be brought in and Courneya move to sales full-time. After this restructuring another US$250,000 was made available to them from Community Investment Enterprises, Inc, (CIE). Courneya and Fuller were able to repay their investors and buy out smaller shareholders as profits began to grow. Courneya was re-appointed president. In the early 1970s, the Bradley ads began to describe the company as the Automotive division of the Thor Corporation.

By 1977 the company's sales had grown to a six-figure net profit from roughly US$6,000,000 in sales. New offices were obtained in Shelard Plaza, and the company was featured in an enthusiastic article in the local newspaper. The company introduced the Bradley GT II, a new, much more refined vehicle that year.

Between 1977 and 1979 Fuller left Bradley and established another company named Autocraft Inc., which became a supplier of bodies to his former company. Bradley would eventually contract out all of its manufacturing, not producing any components themselves.

In 1978 seven of Bradley's salesmen defected to its competitor Fiberfab. Bradley sought an injunction preventing the competition from enticing any more of its sales staff to leave. Courneya claimed that the company experienced a loss of $300,000 in expected sales in October of that year. Bradley filed for bankruptcy shortly thereafter and operated under Chapter 11 protection until April 1980. Six months later the name of the company was changed to Classic Electric Car Corporation. The name change reflected a plan to sell an electrified version of the GT II. The company underwent another name change, this time to The Electric Vehicle Corporation (EVC), some time later.

Complaints and lawsuits from dissatisfied customers began to mount, and picket lines appeared outside its head offices. In 1979 the Minnesota attorney general's office asked for an injunction that would force EVC to warn its customers in writing that the company had either shipped product late or failed to ship it at all. At the end of July 1981 the attorney general formally charged EVC with consumer fraud.

Reported deficiencies included kits that arrived missing key parts, or parts that did not fit. Some clients did not receive their kits at all, as the company was taking orders for 30 to 40 cars per month but only had the capacity to produce 10 or 11 kits in that time. Another major issue was Bradley's "Executive Broker Program", which claimed to offer prospective buyers the chance for significant income. The buyer was offered a discounted price for his kit and the exclusive right to be the licensed Bradley broker for his geographic area. It was discovered that every kit buyer got the special pricing, and that other "dealerships" were in the same area.

Named in the attorney general's complaint were Courneya and Deil Gustafson, a Minnesota lawyer and real estate developer who had acquired a 50% ownership of the company in 1980 when he invested US$600,000 in Bradley. Courneya owned the other 50%.

Among the creditors owed money by Bradley were Media Networks of New York City, IBM, Northwestern Bell Telephone, law firm McGovern, Opperman & Paquin, and Lester Electric of Nebraska. The company entered bankruptcy with an estimated US$2,500,000 of debt. Bradley Automotive did not resume operations.

== Bradley GT Models ==
=== GT ===
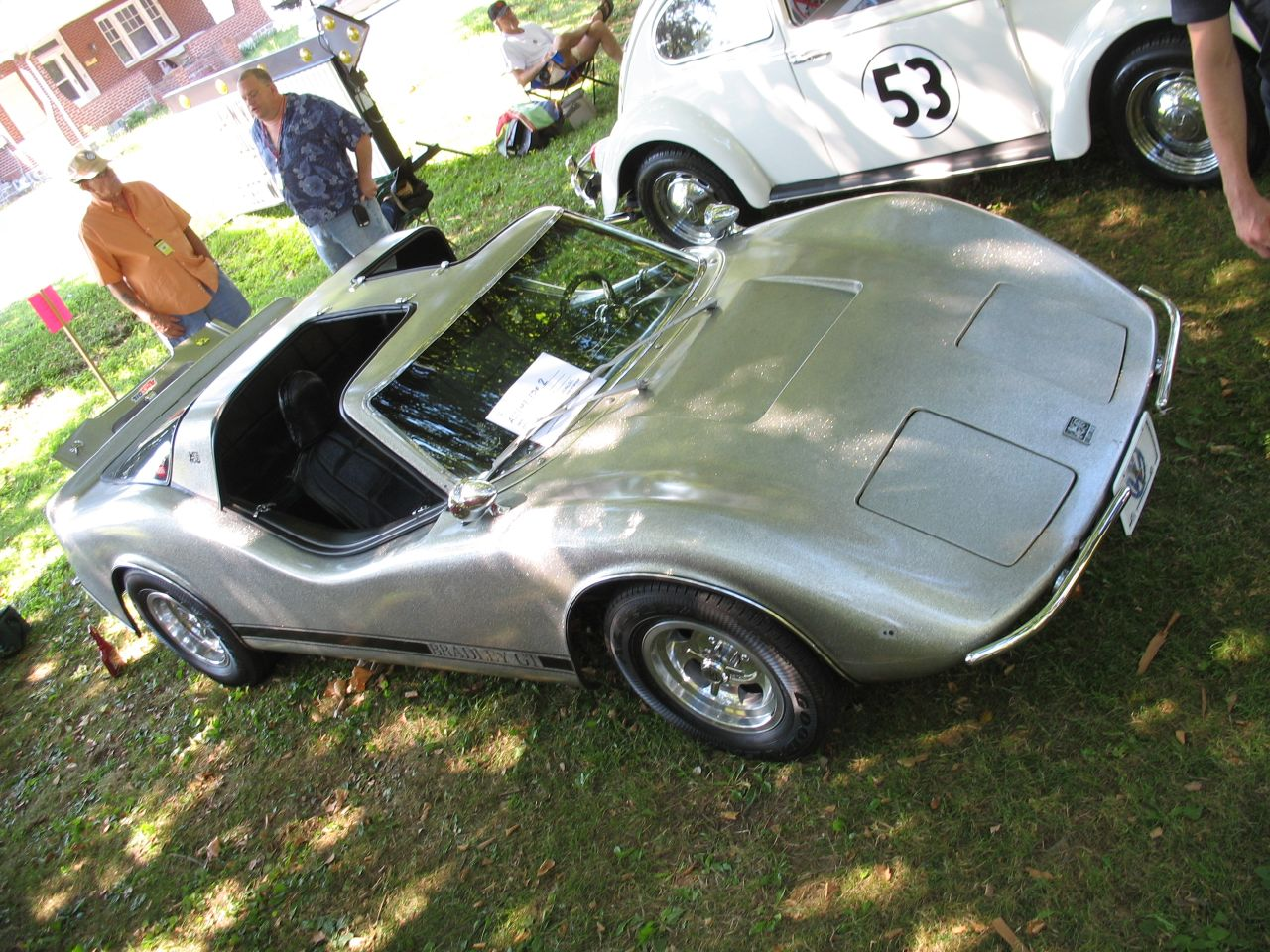
Bradley GT

The GT was the first product sold under the Bradley Automotive name. The car's development was extremely informal, and the cost for prototyping materials was estimated to only have been US$2000. According to the Bradley newsletter the first production GT was delivered in September 1970. The car was available in kit form in different levels of completeness, or as an assembled vehicle. A completed GT weighed approximately 1,600 lb (725.7 kg).

The GT's body was a two-seat coupe with low curved sides and no doors. Weather protection was provided by two frameless plastic panels that extended into the roof and hinged up gull-wing style. Hidden headlamps were mounted under two large opaque covers.

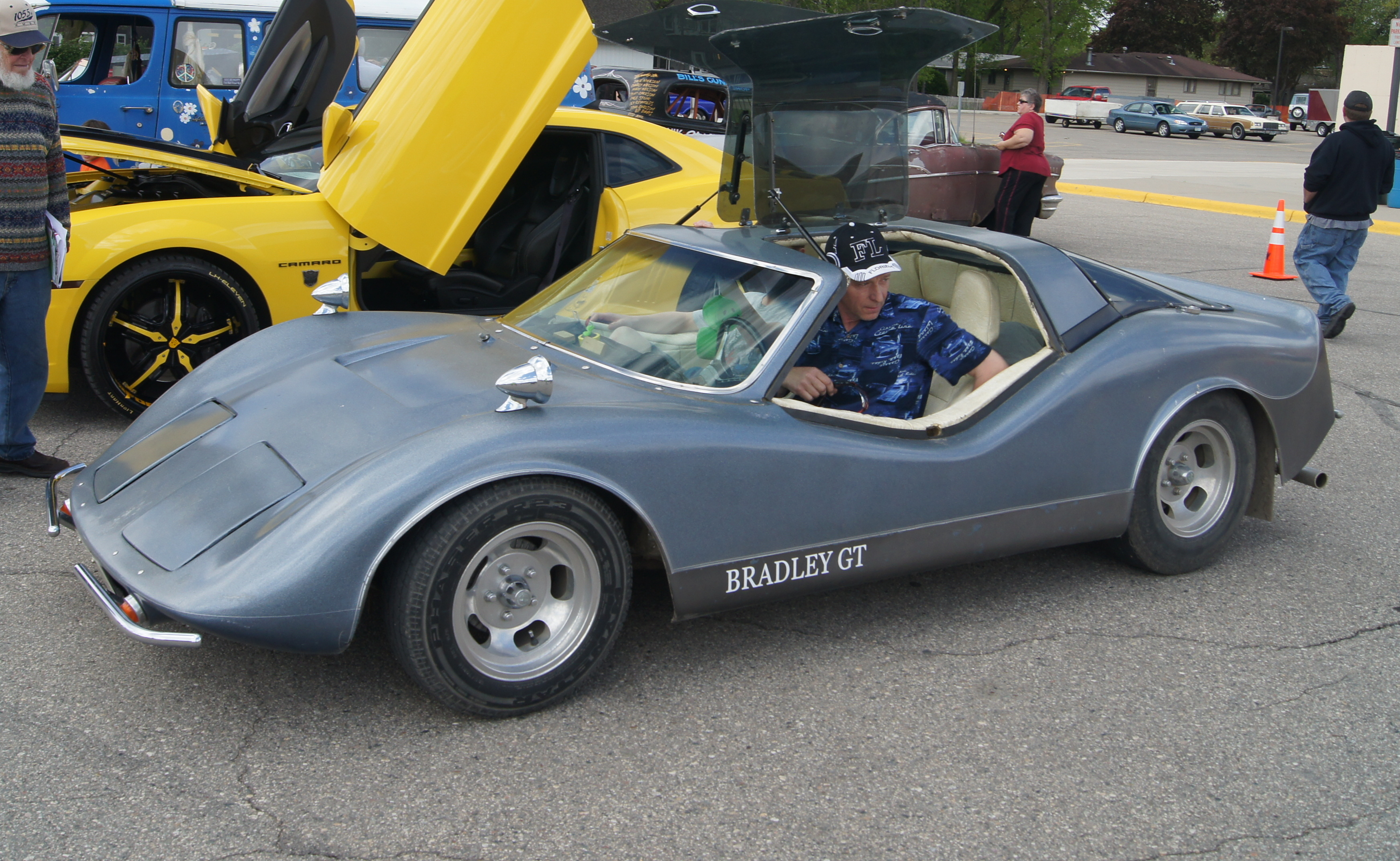
Bradley GT

The body was laid up in fiberglass and designed to mount on an unmodified Volkswagen Beetle chassis. The GT thus inherited its 2,400 mm (94.5 in) wheelbase from the donor vehicle, while front and rear tracks could vary depending on the builder's choice of wheels and tires. Suspension front and rear was via the VW's transverse torsion bars and trailing arms. The default power-train was likewise the air-cooled four-cylinder boxer engine and four-speed manual transmission with swing axles from the donor Beetle.

The GT incorporated many parts from other cars built in larger volumes. The windshield, for example, was from the 1963-1967 Corvette. One consequence of this reuse of common parts is that many parts for the GT remain in plentiful supply.

Due to the car's do-it-yourself nature, there was considerable variation between finished vehicles. Some GTs replaced their hidden headlamps with fixed headlamps under transparent covers. Bradley offered the backlite in three variations; a short three-sided piece, a longer fastback piece that extended back to the base of the rear spoiler, or an extended wagon-back rear cover. The power output or even type of engine could also vary widely, depending on the owner/builder's wishes.

The Bradley GT was in production from 1970 to 1981. The total number of Bradley GTs produced is estimated to have been 6000 cars.

=== GT II ===
In 1975, industrial designer and former Shelby American employee John Chun helped design a new car for Bradley that would be called the Bradley GT II.

The GT II was described as a "Luxury Sports Car Kit" in its knock-down form, although it could be had as a turn-key car as well. Even though still based on a VW Beetle chassis, the GT II was a much more sophisticated vehicle than the earlier GT. New features included true gull-wings doors with frames, sliding safety glass in the doors and interior door releases with gas struts, a lower sill to ease ingress and egress, improved bumpers and steel reinforcing in the roof. The retractable headlamps were now electrically driven. The interior was much roomier, with custom seats able to comfortably accommodate passengers over 6 feet in height. Instrumentation was provided by a set of VDO Jet Cockpit gauges.

Development of the GT II cost approximately US$1,000,000. The GT II was finally released in November 1976. The car was later offered in one Special edition; the Solid Gold Series 14000 G Limited Edition. The GT II would also become the basis for Bradley's electric GTE.

A total of 500 GT II cars are believed to have been built. Today this Bradley model suffers from a scarcity of GT II-specific parts such as window glass, upholstery and fiberglass body components.

=== GTE ===
In 1980 Bradley released a version of the GT II powered by a battery bank driving an electric motor. This model was at first called the GTElectric. The name soon became the GTE Electric and then simply the GTE.

The car was developed with the assistance of General Electric's Electric Vehicle Systems Operation (EVSO). GE supplied the car's Tracer I direct-traction motor, which developed 20.7 horsepower (15.4 kW) and was installed in place of the original VW engine. GE also supplied an EV-1 motor controller.

The main battery bank was made up of 16 6-volt batteries connected in series for a total of 96 volts. A switch inside the car allowed the driver to switch from `Boost' mode, which delivered the full 96 volts to the motor for extra power, to `Cruise' mode, which reduced motor voltage to 48 volts and extended the driving range. The 17th battery was a 12-volt unit used to run accessories like headlamps and windshield wipers. With the batteries installed the car weighed about 2,900 lb (1,315.4 kg). The original VW suspension was retained, but overload shock-absorbers were installed to handle the extra weight.

Top speed was over 75 mph (120.7 km/h) in Boost mode, and 55 mph (88.5 km/h) in Cruise mode. On Boost the car accelerated from 0-30 mph in 8 seconds.

A total of 50 GTEs were built. The all-electric conversion developed for the GTE was to be applied to the rest of Bradley's (now EVC's) product line.

=== Derivatives and successors ===
During the years that the Bradley GT was in production some competing cars appeared that were not Bradleys but that were clearly at least partial copies.

One such car was the Scorpion GT sold by VW/GT Conversions in the early to mid-1970s. The Scorpion's body was nearly indistinguishable from the Bradley GT from the A-pillar back, but the front was reshaped with a center power bulge, a larger grille opening and a single round exposed headlamp faired into each side of the nose. The Scorpion's roof had a removable panel that allowed it to be used as a targa top.

Another car that mimicked the looks of the Bradley GT was the Lithia GT. This car had a body and roof structure that closely resembled the GT's from the A-pillar back but with a slim air intake in front and a single round exposed headlamp integrated into each front fender.

After Bradley Automotive went out of business the molds and rights for the Bradley GT were sold to SunRay Products, who put the original GT back into production. Sun Ray also developed a "Sport Pack" body kit that gave the car a ground-effect look and added a rear engine cover that lifted up.

== Other car models ==
In 1980 Bradley Automotive bought or obtained the rights to several other kits to expand their product line.

=== Baron ===
The second car to be called the Bradley Baron was not a dune buggy but rather a Neo-Classic roadster patterned after the Mercedes Benz SSK. The car was a copy of the Classic Motor Carriages Gazelle.

=== MGT ===
The Bradley MGT was a copy of the 1952 MG TC roadster built on the VW Beetle chassis. A version of it with electric power was sold by EVC.

=== Veebird ===
Bradley acquired the molds for a copy of the 1957 Thunderbird body made to fit a VW Beetle chassis from Veebird in Colorado.

=== Marlene ===
The Bradley Marlene was an attractive Neo-Classic roadster in the style of the Mercedes Benz 540K. After Bradley went out of business the molds were sold to Classic Roadsters.

== Other products ==
Bradley also manufactured a limited number of non-automotive products. One such product was a one-wheeled trailer called the TAG-Along. Bradley also built a small recreational fiberglass boat called the Surfer GT.

== Famous owners ==
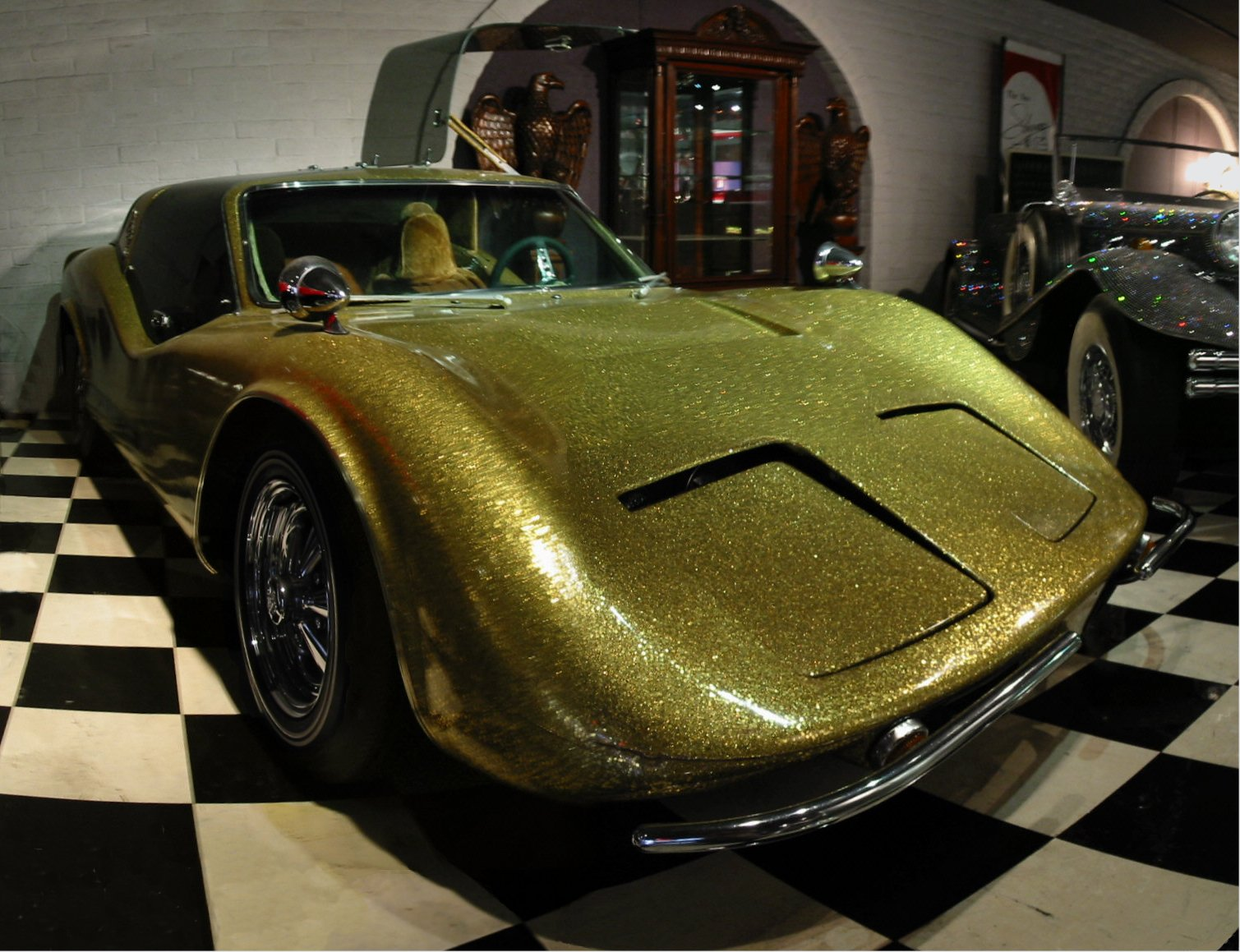
Liberace's gold metal-flake Bradley GT

- Liberace: Pianist, singer, actor. Owned a Bradley GT.
- Barry Goldwater: Politician, businessman, author. Owned a Bradley GT II.
- Gaylord Perry: Major-league baseball pitcher. Owned a Bradley GT II.
- Andrea Jaeger: Professional tennis player. Owned a Bradley GT.
- Ed Begley Jr.: Actor, environmentalist. Owned a Bradley GTE.
- Don Yenko: Chevy COPO dealer and race car driver. Acquired a Bradley GT, likely as a trade in. Was driven briefly by daughter Terri.
- Jeff Dunham: American comedian and ventriloquist. Owns or has owned several Bradley GTs.

== In popular culture ==
A brown Bradley GT with aftermarket red headlight bulbs was used in the music video for New Freezer by Rich the Kid and Kendrick Lamar.

A white with red stripped electric GTE, was featured in the 1983 supernatural horror film Mausoleum.
