= Fiberfab =

Defunct American motor vehicle manufacturer

- Industry: Auto manufacturing
- Predecessor: Sports Car Engineering
- Founders: Warren Harding Goodwin; John E. Hebler
- Fate: Acquired
- Products: Automobile body kits and complete cars.

Fiberfab was an American automotive manufacturer established in 1964. Starting with accessories and body parts, they progressed to making kit cars and fully assembled automobiles. They became one of the longest lasting kit car manufacturers.

== Corporate history ==
=== Sports Car Engineering ===
After moving from Wisconsin to California, Warren Harding "Bud" Goodwin began racing sports cars. He built his own racing special, topped with a Microplas Mistral body. Goodwin incorporated Sports Car Engineering (SCE) in 1957 to manufacture Mistral bodies under license and sell them as the SCE Spyder. SCE's bodies incorporated the innovation of bonding steel tubing into the fiberglass for rigidity. SCE also manufactured custom chassis. By the time Goodwin sold the company to Du Crest Fiberglass in 1958, SCE's product line had grown to include the Tornado and Hurricane models.

=== Fiberfab Co. ===
In 1964 Goodwin and partner John Hebler established the Fiberfab Company in Palo Alto, California. The company started building street rod parts and body panels for Corvettes, Mustangs, and Jaguars before moving on to complete bodies and kit cars.

Noel Johnson was a Fiberfab employee who later became part owner of the company. He said that Goodwin was impressed by the Devin body kit concept, but wanted a product that would be easier for the inexperienced home builder to assemble.

Within two years Fiberfab had launched several complete body kits, including the Apache, Aztec and Aztec II, and the Centurion.

=== Fiberfab, a division of Velocidad Inc. ===
In 1966 Fiberfab was made a subsidiary of Velocidad Inc., another company controlled by Goodwin. The key people in Velocidad were Jamaica K. Goodwin (president), Warren “Bud” Goodwin (vice-president), and John E. Hebler (Secretary-Treasurer/plant manager). The company was also referred to as Fiberfab-Velocidad Inc.

The Fiberfab company moved from Palo Alto to Sunnyvale. In early January 1967 Fiberfab opened a new plant to produce the Valkyrie in Santa Clara.

In 1967, Goodwin was arrested on suspicion of murder in the shooting death of his 28-year-old second wife and Fiberfab executive, Jamaica Karen Goodwin (née Elwood). He was convicted of voluntary manslaughter and sentenced to twelve months imprisonment. He died of a heart attack while serving his sentence on 26 December 1968.

Around this time Hebler left the company to start Hebina Plastics with John Ubina, Fiberfab's former head of fiberglass layup. Hebina designed their own car called the Gazelle, which was unrelated to the Neoclassic Gazelle sold by Classic Motor Carriages (CMC). By 1970 the company had been acquired by Bill Voegele, a former Fiberfab engineer, and changed its name to Voegele Industries to reflect the change in ownership. The car was released as the Voegele Amante GT.

=== Fiberfab Corp. division of Concept Design America Ltd. ===
In 1971 Richard G. Figueroa, Fiberfab's plant manager, partnered with Martin Enterprises, Fiberfab's Eastern US distributor, to start Concept Design America Ltd. (CDA) and salvage the financially struggling Fiberfab. They took control of the bodymaker and reorganized it as the Fiberfab Corp. division of CDA.

=== Fiberfab Inc., division of A.T.R. Inc. ===
In November 1974 Fiberfab Inc. was purchased by Pennsylvania-based A.T.R. Incorporated. Aris V.C. Valli was appointed president of the company.

In August 1976 Aris Valli died from a heart attack and his son, Robert F. Valli, became acting president of Fiberfab. The company began an internal reorganization.

In October 1978 Fiberfab, Inc. put new marketing and management teams in place, with Robert F. Valli as president. The number of models was reduced to three by cutting four product lines, including the Avenger GT.

=== Fiberfab International Inc. ===
After a reorganization in 1979, the company changed its name to Fiberfab International Inc. One source reports that the company did not last more than a single year with that name.

In 1979 the company moved to Minneapolis.

On 13 July 1979 Fiberfab was sued by LaVerne J. Martincic for infringing her claimed trademark of the "MiGi" name. Martincic was the wife of Joseph Martincic, head of the Martin Enterprises Inc. that had controlled Fiberfab. Martincic said that Martin Enterprises had used the MiGi name from as early as 1975, and that she held the rights to the name after Martin Enterprises went out of business in May 1975. Martincic further claimed to have transferred the rights to the name to Daytona Automotive Fiberglass, a new neoclassic builder she was now involved in.

=== Fiberfab International Inc., division of Classic Motor Carriages, Inc. ===
Fiberfab was purchased by competing kit car maker Classic Motor Carriages and registered as Fiberfab International Inc. on 27 May 1983. CMC acquired all of the Fiberfab kits and molds except the Valkyrie, and stored them behind their Miami manufacturing facility unused until they were eventually scrapped.

CMC was forced to close in 1994 after the Florida Attorney General's Office filed suit against it on behalf of 900 of its customers. It agreed to pay $2.5 million in compensation. While the case was proceeding a new company called Auto Resolutions was established by the owner George Levin to continue making Classic Motor Carriages vehicles, later operating under the name Street Beasts. Complaints continued. Street Beasts closed down in 2010 and auctioned off its plant, molds, and machinery in 2011.

=== Factory Fiberfab US ===
In 2003 a new company called Factory Fiberfab US was formed to restart Fiberfab production. Originally based in Creston, Washington, they later relocated to La Pine, Oregon. Factory Fiberfab US was headed by Daniel Richer, and has no affiliation with previous Fiberfab management.

Their primary product was a revised Valkyrie, but they also provided support for older Fiberfab products. This company planned to begin producing Valkyries for the 2004 Model year.

As of June 2025 the company's website still exists, but has not been updated for a long time.

== Products ==
=== Original Fiberfab ===
==== Accessories ====
Fiberfab's product line included assorted autobody accessories and custom parts. The company made fiberglass seat buckets, hoods and hood scoops, wheel flares, and assorted custom body parts for Jaguars and the VW Beetle.

==== Custom Corvette conversions ====
Among the company's first products were replacement nose assemblies for early Corvettes. One version gave older Corvettes a front similar to the XP-700 concept car. Another product more closely resembled the 1961 Mako Shark concept car that influenced the C2 and C3 Corvettes.

==== E/T Mustang conversion ====
Another of Fiberfab's early products was the E/T Mustang conversion. This kit was designed by a moonlighting Larry Shinoda. The final product looked somewhat like the nose of the mid-engined Ford Mustang I prototype.

An estimated fifty E/T Mustang kits were produced by Fiberfab. One was installed on an original Shelby Mustang.

Similar kits were later produced by a company called VFN Fiberglass.

==== Apache ====
The Apache was a complete replacement hardtop body for a Corvette chassis. The body was advertised as being adaptable to other chassis with wheelbases between 98 and 104 in (2,489 and 2,642 mm). The kit was able to reuse the windscreen and doors from a Corvette. It is unknown whether any Apaches were actually sold.

==== Aztec GT ====
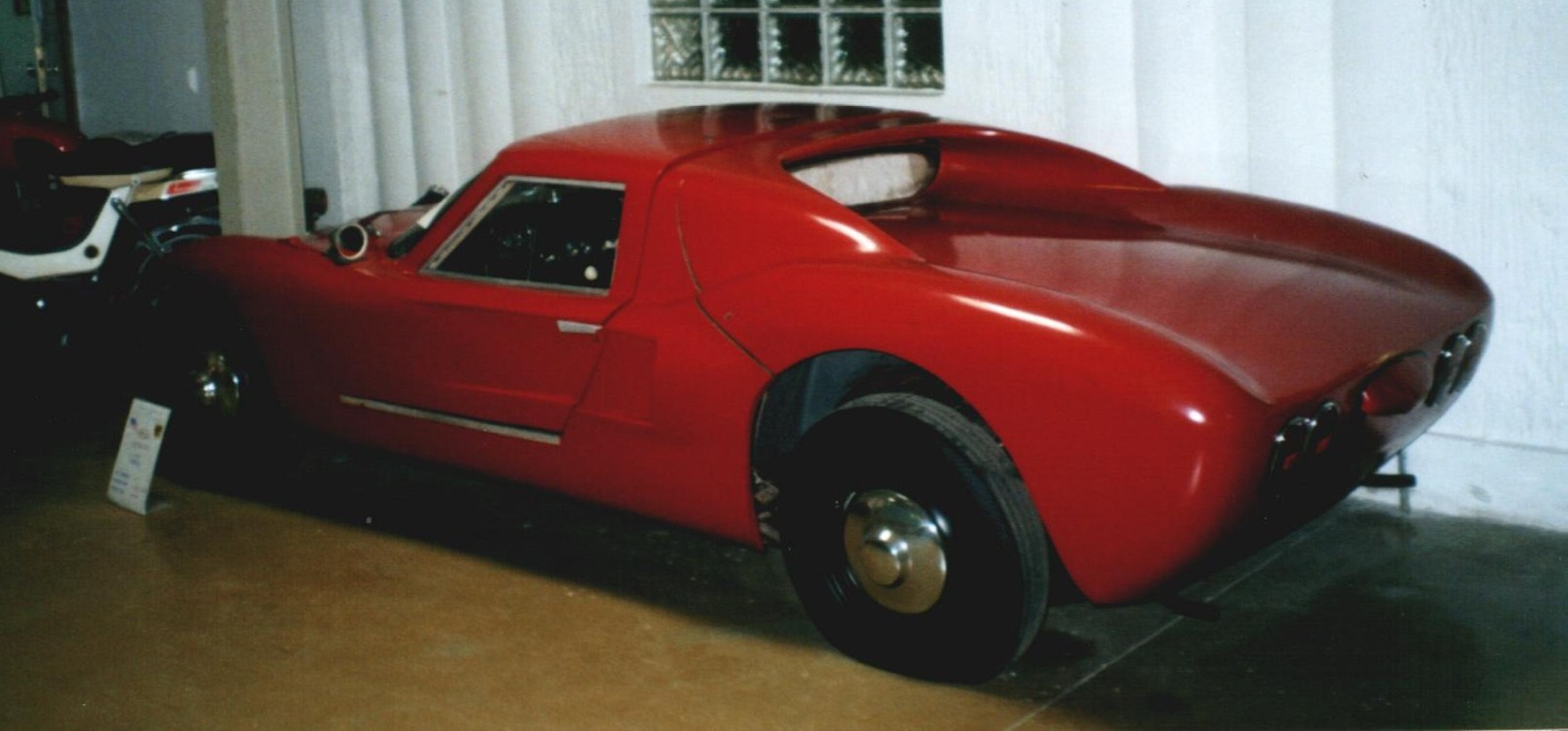
Aztec made by Fiberfab Germany

The Fiberfab Aztec GT came out in 1964 and was built until 1965. The body resembled a Ford GT40 to some, but has also been compared to a coupe version of the earlier SCE Spyder, while still others cite influences including the Lola Mk6 / Lola GT. Different versions of the Aztec GT could be had with an canopy door, gull-wing doors, or conventional doors.

It has been estimated that hundreds or possibly thousands of Aztecs GTs were produced.

==== Aztec II ====
In the fall of 1965 the original Aztec GT was replaced by an upgraded version called the Aztec II. The bodywork of the Aztec II included a bobbed tail with a rear spoiler, and a longer nose. The revisions made the car more closely resemble a GT40.

==== Azteca ====
A further development of the Aztec model, the 1965–66 Azteca included a custom chassis designed to accept a mid-mounted Corvair engine. Just three were built. A restored, customized Azteca appeared at the 2013 SEMA show with a supercharged Corvair engine said to develop in the range of 275–350 hp (205.1–261.0 kW).

==== Banshee/Caribee ====
In the mid-1960s Fiberfab was developing a car to be called the Banshee. It was designed by Russell and Chris Beebe, although they suggest that the mold maker made unauthorized changes to the final shape. During the car's development General Motors (GM) approached Goodwin and bought the Banshee name from him. GM would use the name for their Pontiac Banshee line of concept cars, starting in 1964. The Fiberfab car was renamed the Caribee.

The Banshee/Caribee had gull-wing doors and styling that has been compared to a Shelby Daytona coupe. The body was made to be fitted over a variety of front-engine chassis, including ones from Triumph, MG and Austin-Healey.

Twelve copies of the car were built.

==== Centurion ====
In around 1965 Fiberfab released the Centurion — a replica of the 1959 XP-87 Corvette Stingray Racer. Fiberfab's body was designed to be fitted to a Corvette chassis from 1953 to 1965. Estimates of the number of bodies produced ranges from five to seven, with only five bodies remaining. It is believed that the Centurion was canceled due to pressure from General Motors after a visit by Goodwin to the automaker.

One Centurion appeared in a television commercial for garbage bags, and another was reported to have been backup to the real XP-87 in the movie "Clambake".

Jay Leno owns or has owned a Centurion. In 2018 a Centurion sold at auction for $91,000.

==== Valkyrie ====
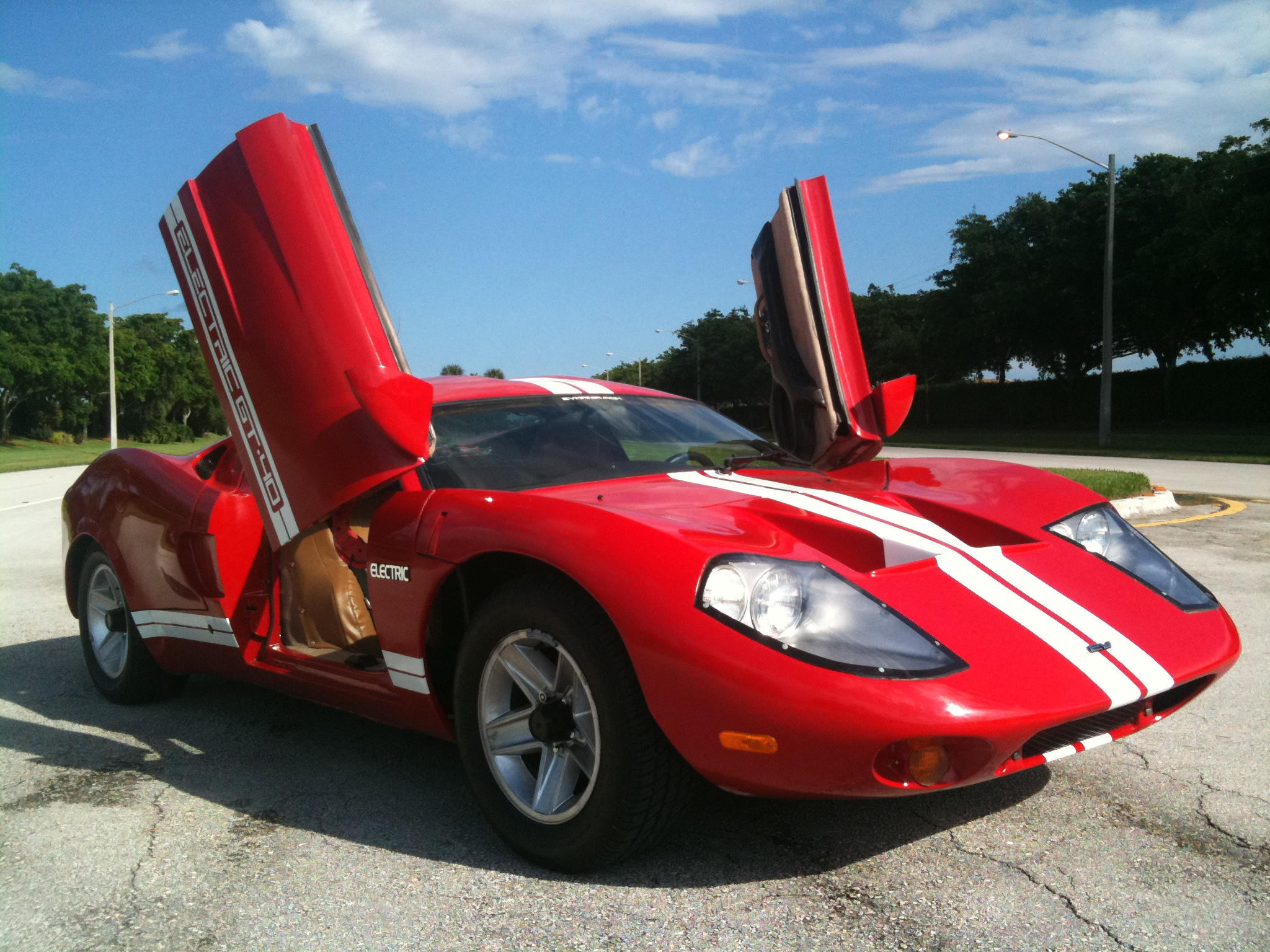
EVGT-40 Electric Car based on a Fiberfab Valkyrie

The Valkyrie was released by Fiberfab in the fall of 1966. It looked even more like the GT40 than did the Aztecs. This mid-engined coupe used a custom steel chassis, and was sold in two forms. One was as a fully assembled automobile called the Valkyrie 500 GT that was priced at $12,500. This version included a leather interior, upgraded running gear and a 427 cu in (7.0 L) Chevrolet big-block engine producing 500 hp (372.8 kW). The other form was as a $1495 kit many of whose parts were sourced by the owner/builder. This version was typically powered by a Chevrolet small-block engine. When CMC bought the assets of Fiberfab Inc., the Valkyrie was not included in the deal.

Production continued in small numbers for many years. In 2003 the Factory Fiberfab US company promised to resume production.

==== Avenger GT ====
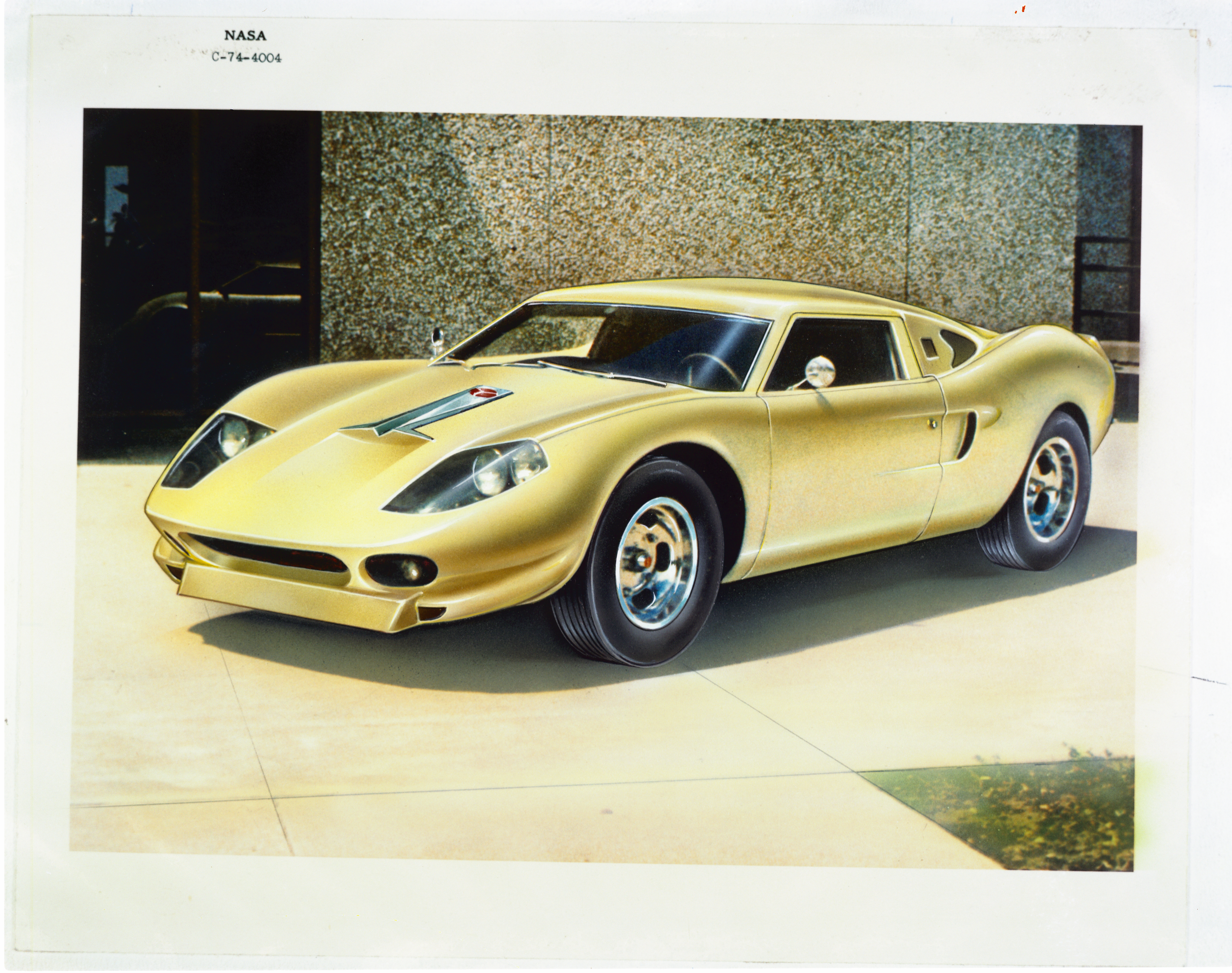
Fiberfab Avenger GT

Released in 1966 shortly after the Valkyrie, the Avenger GT's body was essentially the same as the Valkyrie's, except for having a longer tail section to cover the Avenger GT's rear-mounted engines. Two versions were built: the GT-12, which was based on a Volkswagen Beetle chassis and used the VW's suspension, engine and transaxle, and the GT-15, which had a custom-built chassis that used a Corvair front subframe and suspension as well as the Corvair's rear suspension, engine and transaxle.

Thousands of Avengers were sold in the 1970s. Production ended in 1978.

==== Vagabond ====
The Vagabond was one of two dune buggy models built by Fiberfab. Mounted a full-length VW chassis, the body incorporated headlamps integrated into the front fenderline. The Vagabond was built from 1968 to 1970.

==== Clodhopper ====
The Clodhopper was a traditional dune buggy body for a shortened VW chassis. It was built from 1968 to 1970.

Some Clodhoppers were re-badged and sold as Martin Enterprises buggies during the early 1970s, after Martin Enterprises became a controlling partner in Fiberfab.

==== The Jamaican ====
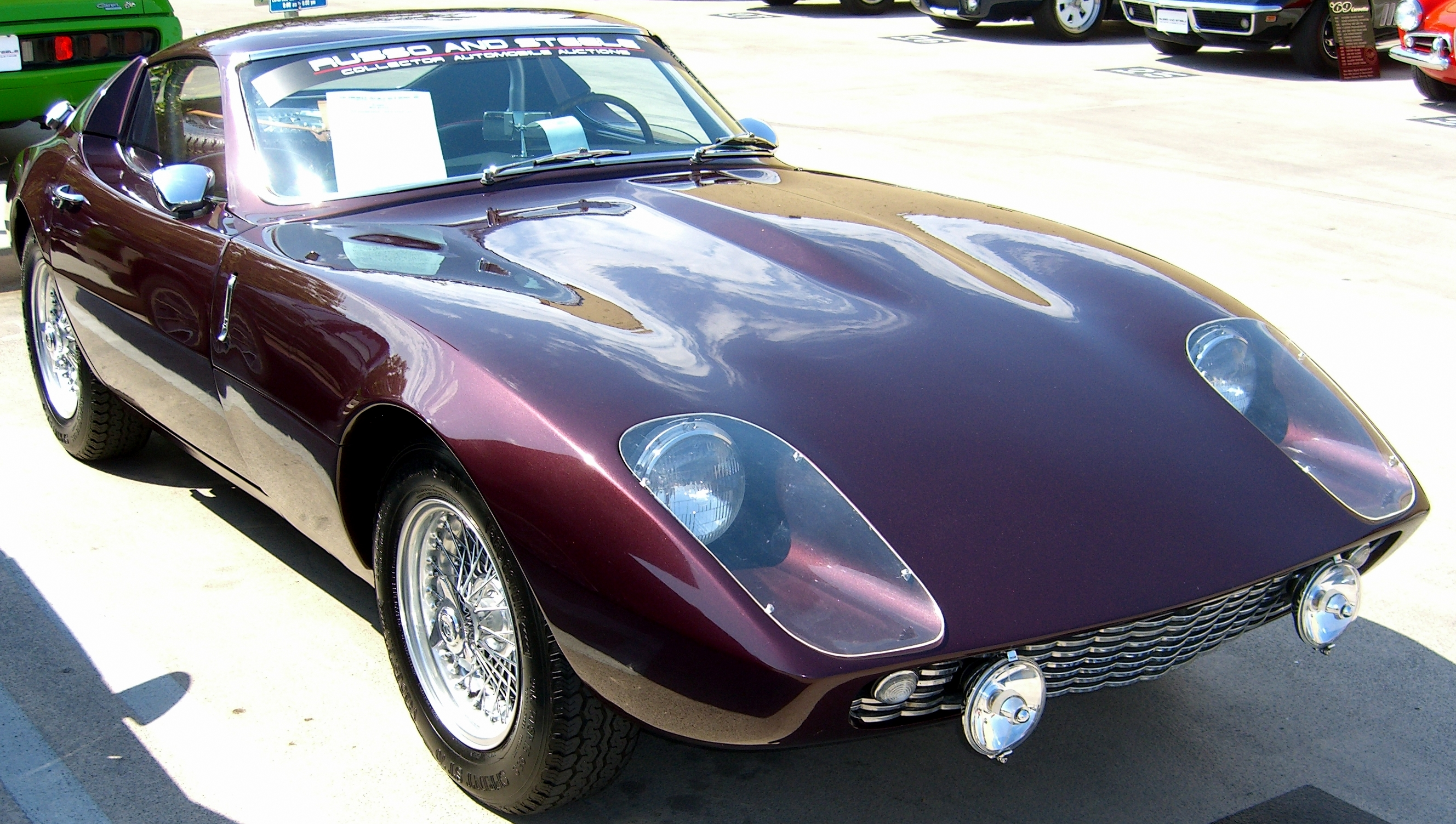
The Jamaican

Introduced in 1968, this was another car based on a design by Chris and Russell Beebe, who also built the molds. The car's shape has been compared to that of the Lamborghini Miura. The formally registered trademark name for the car was "The Jamaican". The car was named for Jamaica Goodwin.

Like the earlier Banshee/Caribee, the body could be fitted to the chassis from a TR3, TR4, MGA, or Austin-Healey.

==== The Jamaican II ====
The Jamaican II was an update to the earlier car. One version of The Jamaican II came with a custom chassis made by Fiberfab that was designed to accept a V8 engine.

Another version of the car could be mounted on a VW Beetle chassis.

==== Aztec 7 ====
The Aztec 7 was a Fiberfab kit inspired by the Bertone Carabo, an Alfa Romeo concept car of 1968. The wedge-shaped car had gull-wing doors and was built on a Volkswagen platform. The windshield is the same used by the Lamborghini Miura. At least two different versions of the Aztec 7 body existed; Type A and Type B.

Production of the Aztec 7 started in the early 1970s. An estimated 400 copies were made.

==== Liberty SLR ====
The Liberty SLR (for "Super Light Roadster") was Fiberfab's first neoclassic kit, with styling similar to an Aston Martin Ulster. The car was designed to use a rear end from a Ford Mustang or Mercury Cougar and to be powered by a Ford Windsor V8 engine. Front suspension was from a 1950–1967 Dodge half-ton truck. It was built by Fiberfab in the mid-1970s.

==== MiGi ====
The original MiGi was an MG TD replica. Fiberfab built it in the mid-1970s, but the car and name were involved in some labor and legal issues. The MiGi was replaced in Fiberfab's line up by the MiGi II.

==== Scarab STM ====
In around 1975 Fiberfab introduced a kit for a reverse tricycle called the Scarab STM (for "Sports Transport Module"). The car used a custom frame with front suspension from a VW Beetle and a motorcycle frame and engine in back. The Scarab STM was made at the company's Baldwin Street, Bridgeville, Pennsylvania plant. As few as six were built.

==== Jet-A-Bout ====
The Jet-A-Bout was an early personal watercraft built by Fiberfab. As suggested by the name, the craft did not use a propeller but rather a jet pump driven by a gasoline engine. Various sizes of engines were offered. The foam-filled hull only required 2 inches (51 mm) of draft. It was Fiberfab's response to the launch of Bradley Automotive's Surfer GT.

=== Re-badged CMC products ===
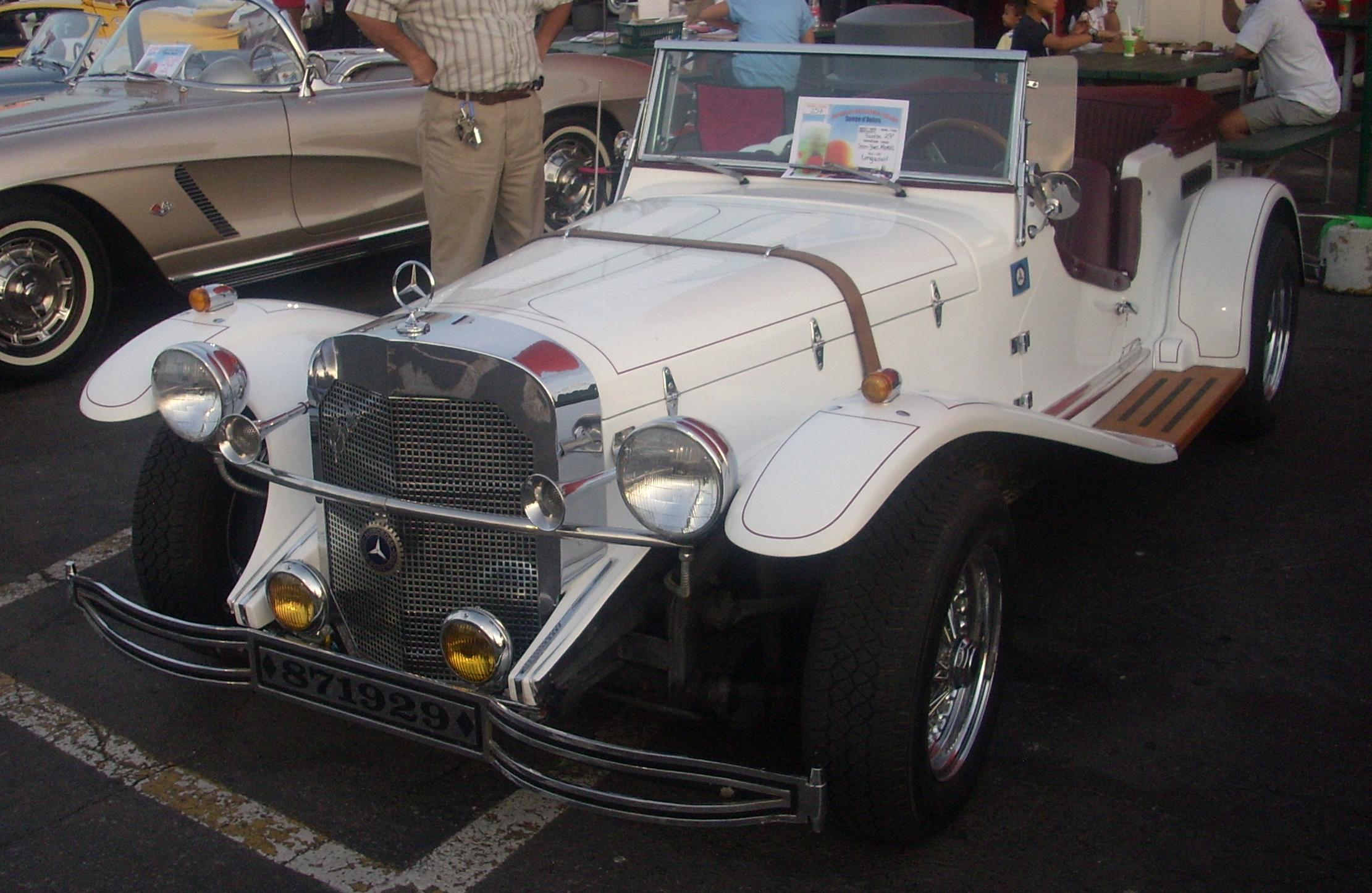
CMC / Fiberfab Gazelle, a 1929 Mercedes-Benz SSK inspired kit-car

==== 1929 Mercedes Benz SSK ====
In 1983 Fiberfab International introduced their 1929 Mercedes Benz SSK replica. This was the CMC Gazelle re-badged as a Fiberfab kit.

The Gazelle was an old design, originally a product of Bay Products Corp., then the Tiffany Motor Cars subsidiary of Bay Products Corporation, and then, on 8 September 1976, a product of Classic Motor Carriages, Inc., when George Newman formed the new company.

==== MG-TD ====
Following the CMC takeover, the MG TD replicas from CMC's lineup were sold as Fiberfabs. In addition to versions based on a Volkswagen chassis, this product also offered the option of being built on Ford Pinto or Chevrolet Chevette mechanicals.

==== Speedster 356 and Californian ====
The Fiberfab Speedster 356 was a re-badged version of the CMC Classic Speedster, while the Californian was the fender-flared CMC Speedster C. The body was inspired by the Speedster variant of the Porsche 356. CMC acquired the design when they bought the rights to the Intermeccanica Speedster. These were built from the mid to late 1980s.

==== Speedster 359 ====
The Speedster 359 was a Speedster 356 whose body was modified to incorporate styling features from the Porsche 959. Production started in the late 1980s. It shared the original 959/911 wheelbase. All body panels except the interior, dash and doors were completely different than the 356 to suit the longer wheel base and 959 styling, which included a larger engine bay for more powerful engines. The body was manufactured of high quality, thick FRP using the latest techniques and alone without the inner structure, tail, deck lids and tail weighed in at 400 lbs. It was the most expensive Speedster in the companies line-up but like the real 959 did not sell well. Most were VW Type 1 powered; however, the builders manual included instructions for mounting Porsche 911 and 914 engine options.

==== Classic Tiffany and Classic Destiny ====
The CMC neoclassic Classic Tiffany was offered as a Fiberfab product in period advertising. This car was based on a long-wheelbase Ford Fox platform from a Mercury Cougar, and was only available as a completed car and was not offered as a kit. The Classic Tiffany was built from 1984 to 1989. A related model was the Classic Destiny built on a shorter Fox chassis from a Ford Mustang.

CMC was sued by Tiffany & Co. over the Classic Tiffany name. CMC had previously done business under the name "Tiffany Motor Cars".

==== Cobra ====
By the middle of the 1980s Fiberfab was selling CMC's Classic Cobra, a replica of Carroll Shelby's AC Cobra, as a Fiberfab product.

==== 1934 Ford Cabriolet and 1934 Ford Victoria ====
Fiberfab offered versions of the 1934 Ford Cabriolet and 1934 Ford Victoria hot rod kits. These were products that CMC had acquired from Southeastern Classic Cars, Inc.

=== Factory Fiberfab US ===
==== Valkyrie ====
The Factory Fiberfab US revival of the Valkyrie body was made from the original, early two-piece body molds.

Upgrades were made to the mechanical aspects of the car. Two versions of the Valkyrie chassis were offered; the GEN 1 and the GEN 2, the latter of which included a new rear suspension system called the Unitized Multi-link Engine Transmission Suspension (U.M.E.T.S.).

==== Machette Speedster ====
Factory Fiberfab US bought the rights and molds for an already-existing kit called the Machette Speedster from its original owner, Gene Steffanson, who was one half of the couple that owned Redhead Roadsters, the car's previous manufacturer.

== Foreign offices, licensees, derivatives, imitators ==
=== Canada ===
In 1968 Goodwin appointed Don Entwistle the exclusive Fiberfab dealer for Canada. A Canadian service centre was located in Toronto, Ontario. In 1969 Fiberfab Canada Limited (FCL) was established in Dauphin, Manitoba with Entwistle as president. In 1970 FCL began manufacturing the long door Avenger GT and the Jamaican. The operation relocated to Winnipeg, Manitoba in 1971.

In May 1974 FCL was bought by B.S.I. Limited and moved to Toronto, Ontario as part of a reorganization. In September of the same year FCL moved to a new 6,000 sq ft (557.4 m^{2}) manufacturing facility in Oakville, Ontario, and renewed their exclusive distributorship with Fiberfab in the US. Former commissioned sales representative Barry Stasiewicz became president and general manager.

In April 1977 FCL began production of the MiGi II MG-TD replica. The car was built on VW Type 1 chassis imported directly from Mexico. In May 1978 FCL stopped producing the Avenger and Jamaican product lines. In November Stasiewicz took on additional responsibilities in training and sales for Fiberfab, Inc. in North America.

In February 1979 all remaining business ties between Fiberfab, Inc., FCL, and B.S.I. were severed due to an impasse over Canadian licensing rights. One month later B.S.I. was wound up. FCL reorganized, and continued with MiGi II production and Bugpack parts distributorship. Three months later, in June, Stasiewicz sold FCL to Glastech Automotive Design Corp. In September P.F. Fiber-Design was contracted for research and design work, fabrication of new molds and production of the MiGi II. In November FCL began producing MiGi IIs for Fiberfab Inc. in the US.

In March 1980 production of the MiGi II is sold to Lakeshore Plastics Ltd., headed by former FCL Vice President Donald C. Bradshaw as its president. In June that year Lakeshore Plastics registered the trade name Burlington MiGi for the continuation MiGi II production, and in September moved to manufacturing facilities in Burlington, Ontario.

Beginning in 1984, FCL began providing a variety of business services to other companies in the area, and starting in 1987 they started providing contract logistics support to Mack Truck Canada. By 1989 they have expanded into providing trade show services to clients that included Paccar, Navistar and Volvo heavy truck divisions.

In 1992 they refocused on development of new model lines, and in 2004 announced a limited production run of 427 S/C Cobra product S/C in kit, rolling chassis and fully assembled forms.

With some Fiberfab models the crest or badge colors can indicate the car's country of origin. The initials of badges on US-built cars were black, chrome, or red, and the field behind them was blue and black. On Canadian cars the initials were black and the background field was green and black.

Fiberfab Canada Limited still exists and maintains a presence on Facebook.

==== MiGi II ====
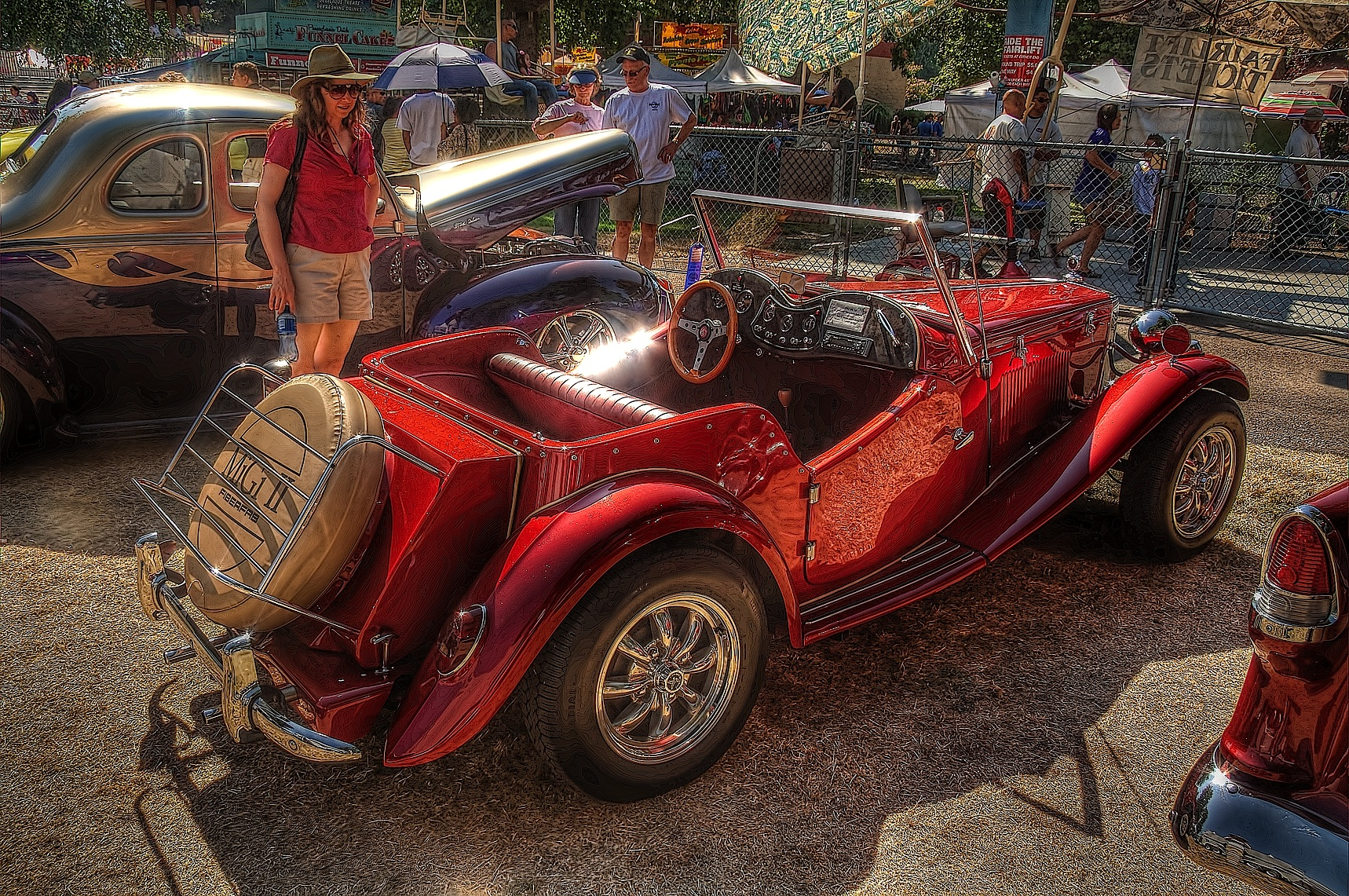
Fiberfab MiGi II

In 1977, after labor difficulties with the MiGi and legal problems with the name, Fiberfab reintroduced their MG TD replica, now called the MiGi II. The updated kit was still based on the VW platform but had revised, more accurate bodywork. The MiGi II was built by FCL in Canada and supplied to resellers in the American North East.

==== Jamaican SKR ====
FCL undertook to redesign The Jamaican model, likely beginning the process in the late 1970s. The revised front-engined model was called the Jamaican SKR. Much of the early work was done in Italy, with the design of the car done in Turin and the prototype built in Milan. The prototype was powered by a Ford Cologne V6 engine that had been prepared in Montreal.

==== 427 Cobra ====
In 2004 FCL introduced their own Shelby replica that was sold as the 427 Cobra.

=== Germany ===
A European branch office of Fiberfab was established in Germany. The company, which still exists, reports that it was started in 1966 in the Remstal region, near Stuttgart.

Some European Fiberfab literature from the time the German branch was founded uses the name "Fiberfab Europa". That was also the name under which an Aztec was displayed at the 1969 Internationale Automobil-Ausstellung (IAA — International Motor Show). The company history uses the name "Fiberfab-Karosserie" (Fiberfab Bodyworks). It also says that they were the first to show a glass reinforced plastic (GRP) body at a major European auto show when they appeared at the 1966 Geneva Motor Show.

Company founder Jörgfrieder Kuhnle was a bodyman who apprenticed at Fiberfab in Santa Clara in the mid-1960s, then relocated to Germany and started Fiberfab there. Kuhnle built his own chassis for a Jamaican kit that would take a V8, but quickly switched to selling Aztec kits under license from Fiberfab in the US.

Fiberfab-Karosserie began to develop their own models, including two GT-style cars, the FT Bonito and the Bonanza, both designed by Kuhnle. In 1973 the German company severed its links with the American Fiberfab, moved to Auenstein, and began to make a light utility vehicle called the Sherpa. Fiberfab GmbH continued to make FT Bonitos until 1981, when they sold the rights to a British Company, ACM.

==== Bonanza GT ====
The Bonanza GT was a two-door grand touring fastback built by Fiberfab-Karosserie from 1967 to 1971.

Instead of being based on a Beetle chassis, the Bonanza GT used the chassis and flat-fan engine from a Volkswagen Type 3.

Production of the Bonanza GT totaled forty-nine copies.

==== FT Bonito ====
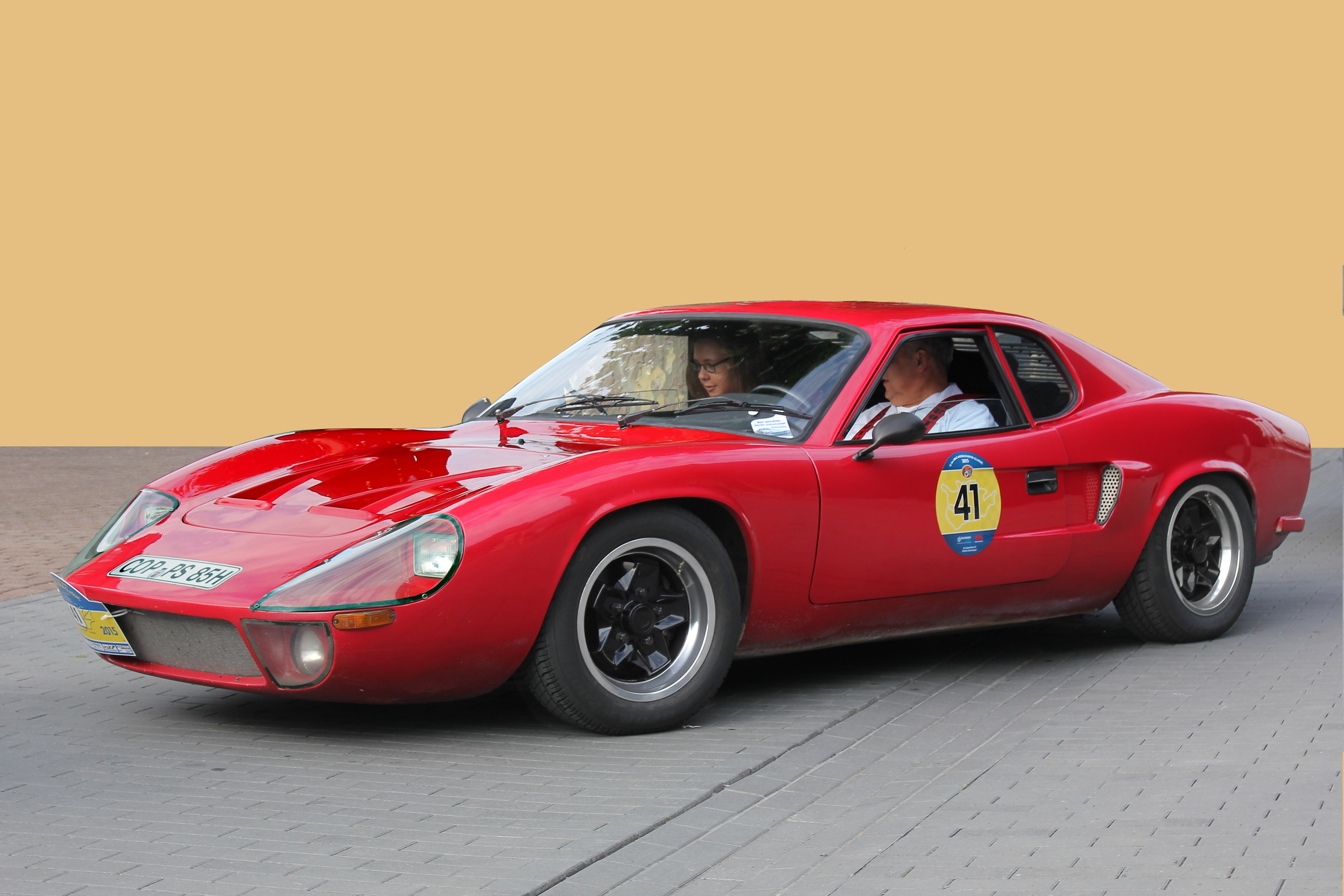
Fiberfab FT Bonito (Germany)

The FT Bonito was introduced in 1969, and production ran until 1980.

Unlike the Bonanza GT, the FT Bonito was based on the VW Type 1 chassis and vertical fan engine. While the nose of the FT Bonito resembled the American Fiberfab Avenger GT's, itself a reinterpretation of the Ford GT40's, the German car had a taller, lighter greenhouse, and smaller, less prominent rear fenders and quarter panels.

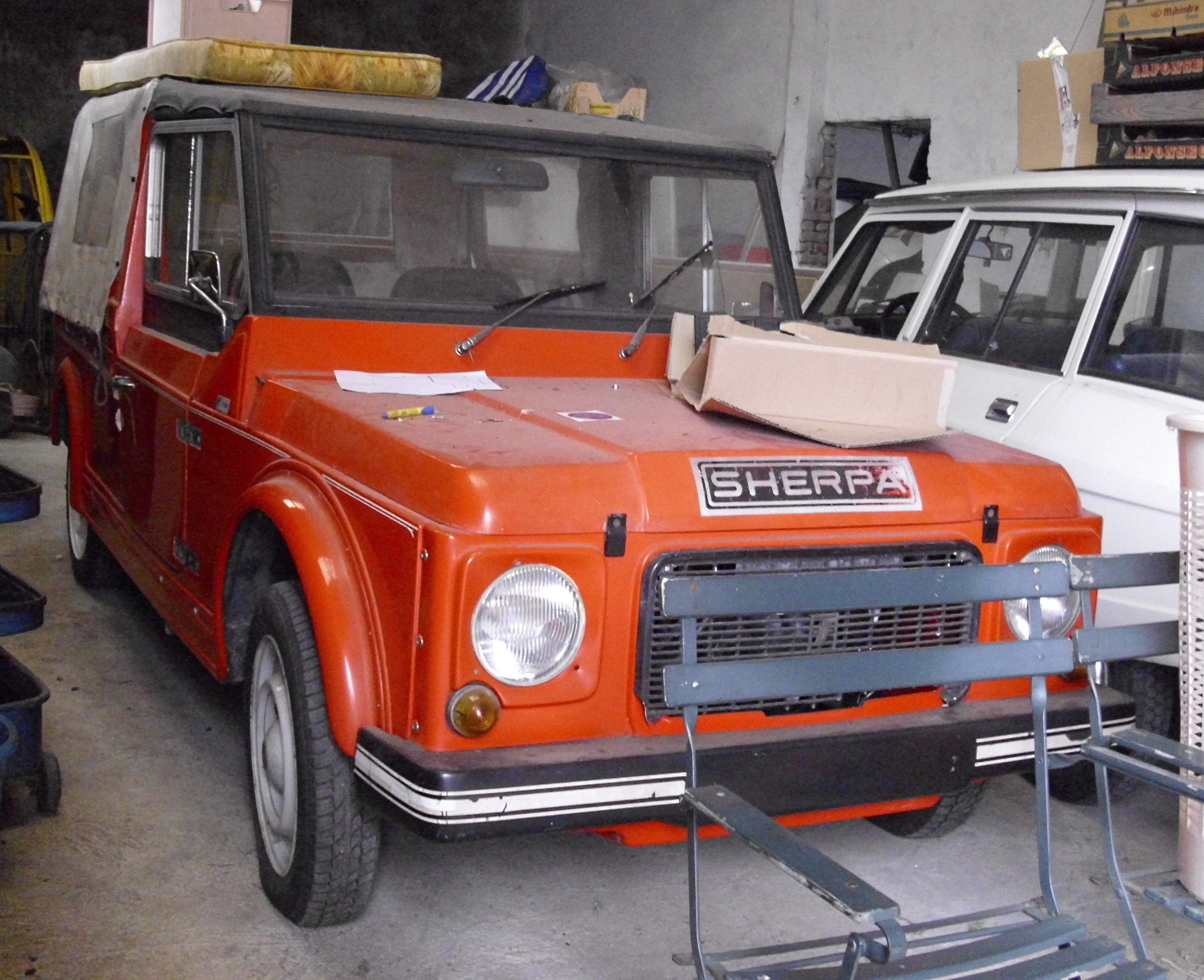
Sherpa (Germany)

Other parts came from a variety of European models. The front windscreen was from a Ford Taunus 12M, and the backlight was from an Opel Rekord Coupe or Opel Commodore A coupe. The headlamps were from a Ford Taunus 15M and the taillamps were from a Karmann Ghia Type 34. Other parts, including door handles, signal lamps, windscreen wipers, bumpers, and various pieces of interior trim came from makes such as Audi, Opel, Mercedes-Benz, and NSU.

It is estimated that one thousand two hundred copies were made.

==== Sherpa ====
The Sherpa was a compact utility vehicle with a truck-like body that debuted in 1975 and was built until 1980. The car was based on the front-wheel drive chassis of the Citroën 2CV, and inherited that vehicle's interconnected suspension and air-cooled boxer twin engine.

Total production was two hundred fifty cars.

=== Sweden ===
In 1968 the "BEA Agenturer" (BEA Agencies) company in Stockholm, Sweden began importing Fiberfab bodies for resale. The owner of BEA, Bo Andrén, encouraged Racing Plast Burträsk (RPB) to develop a locally made alternative to the Fiberfab products. RPB was a company that had started out building Formula Vee cars under license and then developed their own designs. At one point they considered building a road car based on BMC Mini components, but abandoned that project in favor of Andrén's proposal. Key people at RPB included Rune Levander, Kjell Lindskog, and, later, Bror Jaktlund.

In May 1971 there was a fire at the company's factory that destroyed the facility. This, combined with increasingly stringent government crash-test regulations that came into effect on 1 July 1970, resulted in RPB exiting the car body business.

==== RPB Piraya ====
The first car developed by RPB was called the Piraya. Like many Fiberfab products, the Piraya was built on the chassis of a VW Beetle. The car came with gull-wing doors, and styling that was described as clearly derived from the Fiberfab Aztec. Two early prototypes were mid-engined, while later cars were rear-engined. The Piraya was introduced in 1968. Production estimates range from forty, to fifty, to three hundred kits, although the last number may include all of RPB's car output until 1971.

==== RPB GT ====
One year after releasing the Piraya a revised design came out called the RPB GT. This model had standard front-hinged doors, and was designed to be easier to assemble. Production is estimated to have been forty kits.

==== RPB GT2 ====
In 1982, with changes to the Swedish legislation, the company embarked on a return to car building. Under the direction of Lindskog and new CEO Bengt Ingvar Jacobson, the company released their revised RPB GT2 model. Only three cars were made.

=== Finland ===
==== Falcon Devil ====
A Finnish company called Euran Lasikuitu (Euran Fiberglass) were RPB importers. They were given permission to take a mold from an existing RPB car to begin making a replacement for the RPB cars that were no longer available. This version was called the Falcon Devil.

=== United Kingdom ===
==== Bonito ====
In 1981 ACM Limited was started by Alan Bradshaw and Hans Alma in Poole, Dorset. At first they were importers of FT Bonito kits from Fiberfab-Karosserie. In 1982 they bought the rights to the FT Bonito from the Germany company. The company moved to Torpoint, Cornwall to start production of the model with its name shortened to Bonito.

Graham Keane's AED International took over production of the Bonito from 1983 to 1984. AED was originally headquartered at Torpoint, then moved to Bristol.

From 1984 to 1985 the same car was built by the Bonito Performance Center in Torpoint.

==== Seraph 3000 ====
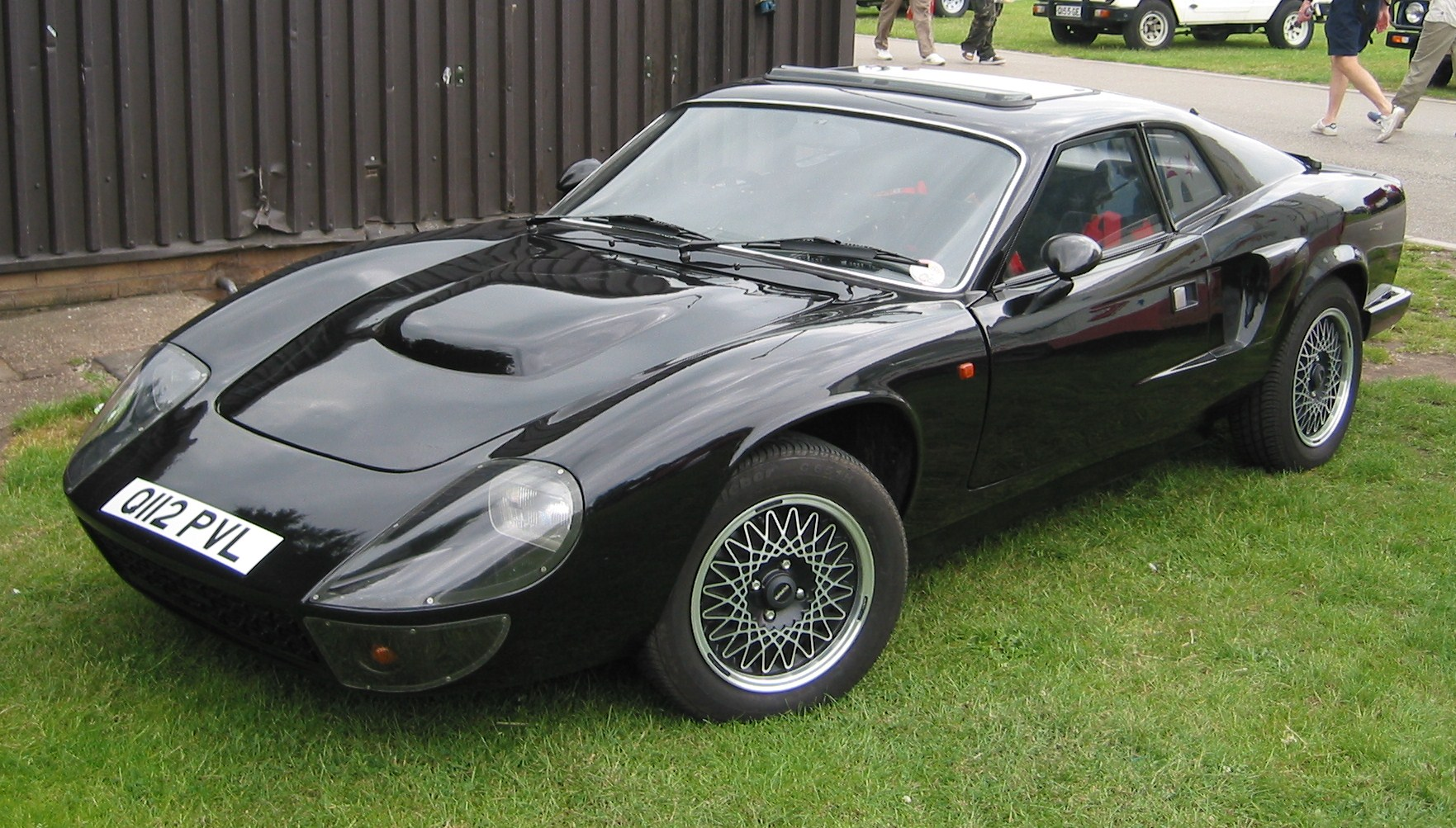
Seraph (UK)

In 1984 a company called Motorstyle began operating in Bristol. Their first product was called the Seraph Sports Racer, and was a mid-engined car with a spaceframe chassis and very boxy styling. The company later changed their name to Seraph Cars, and in 1985 began making a modified version of the Bonito under the direction of John Grossart.

Their version was called the Seraph 3000. It combined the GRP body and a custom steel chassis with the powertrain and running gear from various European Ford models to produce a front-engined, rear-wheel drive coupé. Production continued until 1987. A total of approximately sixty-three copies were made.

==== Excalibur Crusader ====
Clive Clark's Excalibur Cars began building a car called the Crusader (not to be confused with the Clan Crusader) in 1985. This 2+2 coupé has been described as inspired by and a "close clone" of the Bonito. The prototype was based on VW Beetle mechanical parts, but production Crusaders used a custom steel chassis and front-mounted engines, with early cars able to accept any number of Ford inline four and V6 engines, and later models having the option of Rover V8 power. Excalibur offered the car until 1996.

==== WS Cars ====
As late as 2010 Gary Whitfield's Whitfield Specialist Cars were able to produce Bonito bodies to order.

==== Fibre Fab ====
A company named "Fibre Fab" was established in the UK in 1970 that produced fiberglass body kits for Volkswagen chassis. Despite the similar name, they were not related in any way to Fiberfab in the US or any of its foreign branches.

Fibre Fab was founded by partners Robert Taylor, Anthony Hill, and Trevor Pym in Crowthorne, Berkshire. They produced two versions of one model; a short or long wheelbase dune buggy body called the "RAT", which had low-mounted headlamps on either side of a nose piece with a prominent oval indentation. The name was an acronym of the initials of the founders' given names. The RAT's styling was updated in the early 1980s. Production ran from 1970 to 1992, with an estimated 400 bodies built. With the departure of the last original partner, the company was sold to new owners who renamed it "FF Kit Cars & Conversions Ltd." A few years later there was another ownership change and a name change to "Country Volks".

One of the original partners emigrated to Australia. He established a new Fibre Fab company, and began making RAT bodies there. Fibre Fab Australia still exists and maintains a corporate website.

=== South Africa ===
==== Hahn SP ====
The Hahn SP was a modified copy of the Bonito built in South Africa. In the early 1970s two men, Misters Hahn and Schenkie, imported two Bonito kits to South Africa from Germany. One kit was built as a standard Bonito, and the other was adapted to use parts from South African car models. The car was still based on the VW Beetle backbone chassis and engine.

After completing the modifications to the second car a mold was taken of it, and seven bodies were made from the new mold. Six bodies were sold, while the seventh was left in the mold. The bodies were made in East London, and the company was called Auto Hahn. A planned factory never materialized.

=== United States ===
==== Ferrer GT ====
In 1965 Frank Ferrer, a former commercial pilot and owner of Ferrer Aviation Inc. aircraft salvage, bought two Fiberfab Aztec kits as projects for himself and his son Gary. Dissatisfied with the quality of the kit and the difficulty of assembly, Ferrer's son challenged his father to create a better car.

The car Ferrer developed was based on a VW Beetle chassis and engine. The body of one of the Aztecs was used to create a mold, which was then modified to incorporate features from cars like the Ford GT40 and Porsche 904. Dick Buckheit assisted with developing the body shape and mold. The car's original name was Ferrer GT 50, but this was later shortened to just Ferrer GT. Although conceived as something just for family members, Ferrer later decided to put the car into production. The Ferrer Motors Corporation was incorporated in Hialeah, Florida, and later changed its address to Miami. The Ferrer GT debuted at the 1966 Miami International Auto Show.

Estimates of the number of Ferrer GT kits produced range from just over ten to three hundred.

=== Brazil ===
==== Lorena GT ====
León Larenas Izquierdo was a Chilean national who had moved to the US before World War II, hoping to become a pilot. He worked at a company owned by Frank Ferrer that made seats for DC3 and DC4 aircraft, where he learned how to work with fiberglass. Izquierdo later worked for Ferrer Motors making the Ferrer GT.

In 1966 Izquiero emigrated to Brazil, and went to work for a company called Estructofibra, which in 1967 bought a Ferrer GT intending to put a copy into production. Only one body was produced before the molds were transferred to another company called Fibraplast. The car's name was the Lorena GT.

Izquiero set up several other companies to produce the car, including Lorena Importação e Comércio Ltda., Lorena Importação e Comércio Ltda, Lorena S/A Industrial de Veículos, and Protótipos Lorena Carrocerias Especiais Ltda.

The car's official launch was at the 1968 "VI Salão do Automóvel" in São Paulo. After an unsuccessful attempt to arrange a supply of chassis directly from Volkswagen do Brasil, the company bought twenty Volkswagen sedans to use for factory-assembled Lorena GTs. The body was also available in kit form.

Three generations of the car were built, each with minor differences. Approximately one hundred Lorena GTs and kits were built.

==== Jamaro ====
The Jamaro was a one-off prototype built by brothers Jair and Jairo Amaro de Oliveira. The car's original engine was an air-cooled flat-eight engine made by using a giubo to join the crankshafts of two Volkswagen flat-four engines laid end-to-end.

The car's open-topped barquette-style body is said to have been made from either a modified Lorena GT body or a mold taken of a Lorena GT owned by the Oliveiras.

The car's flat-eight was later replaced by a 318 cu in (5.2 L) Chrysler LA V8, and the rear bodywork was revised. In this form the car appeared in several races.

==== Mirage GT ====
In 1976 Helio Herbert Felisoni Junior found several Lorena GT bodies in various states of completion, a chassis, and the complete set of molds from the earlier car in an abandoned shop. Felisoni negotiated the purchase of the parts and rights, and established a company called "Indústria Comercio Plásticos Reinforizados Mirage" and began building a car called the Mirage GT. The company assembled four more complete cars and one body. A single convertible Mirage GT was built. Eventually, due to an ownership dispute, the molds were destroyed. The car was based on the chassis of a used Volkswagen SP2.

==== Menom Andorinha II ====
The Andorinha II was a car built in São Paulo by Menom. It is believed to have been a copy of either a Lorena GT or a Mirage GT, although there are differences between all three cars. Only two Andorinha IIs were built.

==== Lapagesse Lorena GT-L ====
In 2007, while searching for a Porsche 550 replica body in São Paulo, Luiz Fernando Lapagesse discovered what appeared to be an untouched Lorena GT body. Lapagesse bought the body, which was later identified as a Mirage GT body from 1977 to 1981, and began restoring it. Lapagesse was joined by Volker Froese, owner of a Lorena GT, and the two planned to restart production of the car as the Lorena GT-L. Work to reproduce the molds began in 2008, with the first body coming out of the molds in December 2009 and regular production starting the next year. Eighteen examples were manufactured in Rio de Janeiro. In July 2020 Neder Santana bought three cars and the molds, bringing the Lapagesse production to an end.

==== Trivellato Shark ====
Trivellato was one of Brazil's foremost builders of trailers, truck bodies, and related products. In 1970 they unveiled a new sports coupe called the Trivellato Shark. The Shark was built on a standard-length VW platform with a 1,300 cc (79 cu in) twin-carburetor engine tuned by Kadron. The company claimed that this was an original Trivellato design whose shape was created by combining features from many other cars.

While the Shark was favorably received at first, rumors soon began to circulate that it was a licensed version of the Fiberfab Avenger GT-12, then that it was a plagiarized copy of the American car. The Shark soon disappeared from the market. Only thirty to forty copies were made.

== Noteworthy cars ==
=== Movie cars ===
Fiberfab was involved in preparing some of the cars used in the 1971 George Lucas science fiction film THX 1138. The company either built replicas or made modifications to actual retired Lola T70 racing cars.

=== Steam-powered land speed record car ===
In 1977, Fiberfab and James Crank's JDEX Company partnered in an attempt on the steam-powered land speed record. Their car used an LMC Corporation steam engine developed as part the Lear Steam Bus Program, and was clad in a heavily modified Aztec 7 body kit. Little of the original body remained except the roof and door. The record attempt took place in August at Bonneville. The car failed to exceed 100 mph (160.9 km/h), and was then sold to the Barber-Nichols Engineering Company, who rebuilt it. On its first attempt it reached 111 mph (178.6 km/h). On 19 August 1985 Robert Barber piloted the car to a one-way speed of 145.607 mph (234.332 km/h) at Bonneville, but the car caught fire and was unable to complete its second run. The car is on display at the National Automobile Museum in Reno, Nevada.

=== Electric and hybrid conversions ===
Several Fiberfab kits have been converted to battery-electric or hybrid powertrains. Some are listed below.

==== Ellers Electric and Hybrid Electric EV conversions ====
Clarence Ellers built two Aztec 7s with electric or hybrid-electric drivetrains.

The first of Ellers' Aztec 7s was built as a pure electric car, with sponsorship from Fiberfab.

A second car was built with a hybrid drive system. This car had a custom chassis made of aluminum. Motive power came from an electric motor driving the front wheels, and an air-cooled 436 cc Kawasaki parallel-twin motorcycle engine driving the rear wheels. This car was later donated to the Historic Electric Vehicle Foundation.

==== NASA Battery-electric vehicle ====
To test electric vehicle propulsion systems using a special dynamometer called the "Road Load Simulator" (RLS), NASA commissioned construction of a special vehicle that was designed from the outset as an electric vehicle. A custom ladder chassis with outriggers was built by "Electric Vehicle Engineering Co." (EVE) of Boston, Massachusetts. Configured for front wheel drive, the car's running gear was from Saab. The body was a Fiberfab shell, and a photo from a newspaper article on the FCL site describes it as an Avenger GT.

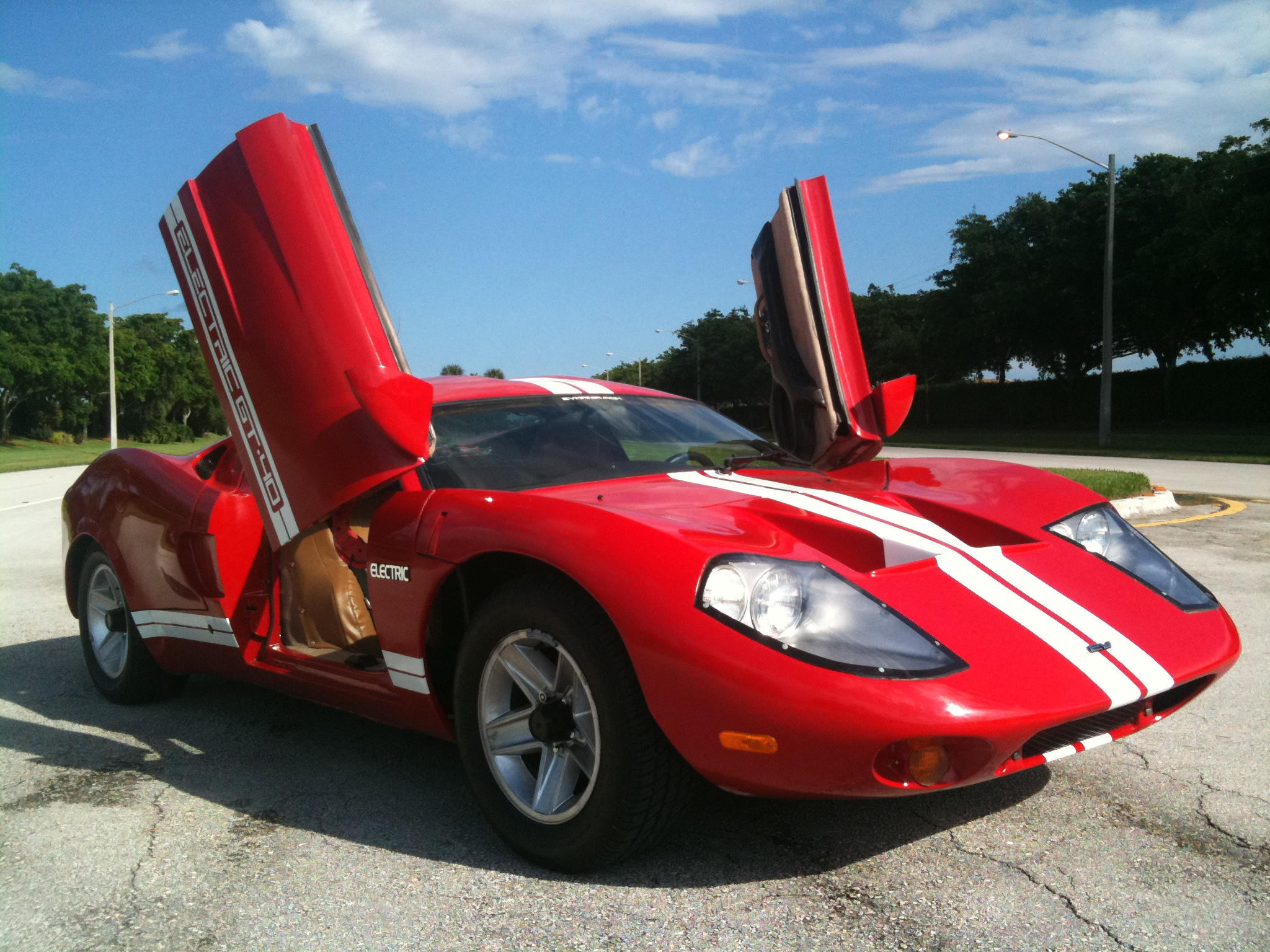
EVGT-40 Valkyrie conversion

==== EVGT-40 ====
The EVGT-40 is a Fiberfab Valkyrie converted to electric power by Andrew McClary.

==== CNG-Hydrogen-electric hybrid ====
Another experimental car was built that may have used a Fiberfab body. The vehicle was a hybrid that used an electric motor for motive power, coupled with a battery pack of twelve 12-volt deep-discharge batteries that weighed 600 lb (272.2 kg), along with a 650 cc (39.7 cu in) two-stroke engine running on a combination of compressed natural gas (CNG) and hydrogen that drove an alternator to charge the batteries, as well as a fuel cell with its own hydrogen tank for additional recharge capacity.

Confusion arises due to the fact that, while the text refers to the body being a "fiberfab", the picture and accompanying caption are of another kit.
