= Microplas =

Microplas Limited was formed in 1954 in Uxbridge by group of 750 Motor Club members. They were Mike Eyre, Roger Everett, Bill Ashton, Sandy Wemyss, Tony Wemyss, and one other who was associated with the Hunting family. The Huntings were among the first to make reinforced plastics for the British military during World War Two. Microplas had access to this technology. The Mircroplas also traded as Microbond.

In the mid 1950s Microplas relocated its factory to Mitcham, Surrey. The company diversified into boats and hardtops. The boats were built under Microplas and Microplus names.

== Stilletto ==
The Stilletto was the first body Microplas developed. It was designed for the owners Austin Sevens and was made from fibreglass, a new material at that time.

== Mistral (Spyder, TK-102) ==
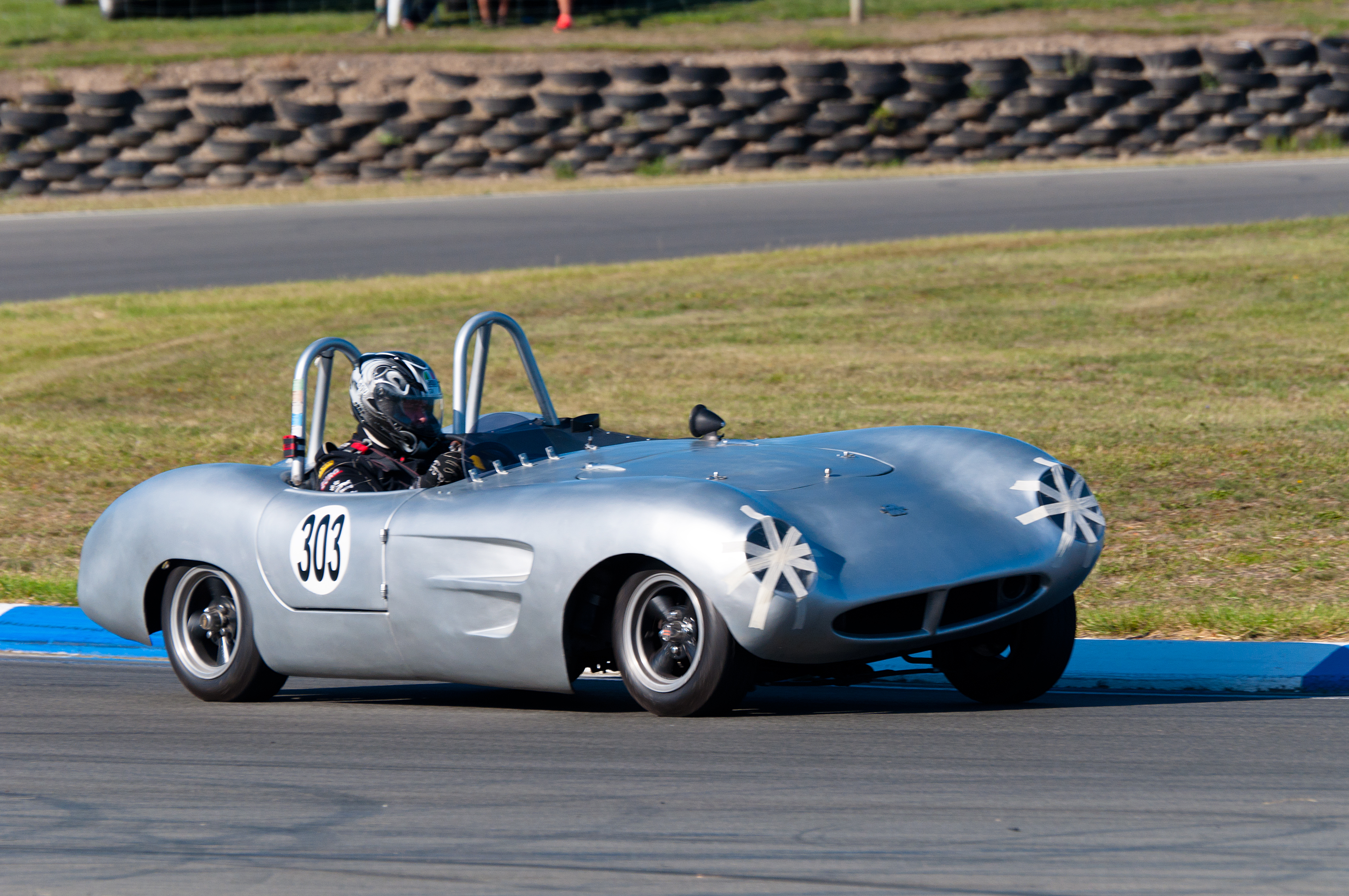
Mistral

The Mistral was Microplas’s second body design announced in April 1955 and intended for the Ford Ten. It was designed by Bill Ashton. Ashton was a former RAF fighter pilot, Lotus Mark VI amateur racer, and MG car company worker. At various points in time Buckler (DD2 model and some other models), Fairthorpe (1956-1957 Electron models), Frazer Nash, and TVR Jomar all used the Mistral body.

A Mistral body was fitted to the Frazer Nash Le Mans Replica. The car was raced in 1955 by Ken Wharton. Wharton crashed and the car was virtually destroyed.

=== Sports Car Engineering ===
In 1956, Californian sports car racer Warren "Bud" Goodwin licensed the body from Microplas and sold it in the United States through his Los Angeles company, Sports Car Engineering, as the Spyder. One of the Sports Car Engineering's Mistral bodies was used by Frank Arciero on his Arciero Special, a car raced by Dan Gurney. Goodwin sold the Mistral for a couple of years before selling Sports Car Engineering to company Du Crest Fiberglass in 1958. Another Los Angeles company, Track Kraft made the Mistral in late 1950s early 1960s and marketed it as the Track Kraft TK-102. Goodwin went on to found Fiberfab.

=== New Zealand ===
The Mistral was sold in Great Britain, United States and Germany. It was also brought to New Zealand by Christchurch boat builder and racing driver, Bob Blackburn. Blackburn, trading as Weltex Plastics Limited, intended to go into full production with a Graeme Dennison designed chassis, but couldn’t source enough Ford Prefect parts and so sold the body and chassis as a kit car. About 10 cars were completed by Weltex and 10 bodies sold between 1956 and 1961. A Dunedin company, Emslie and Flockton Limited, also made and sold the Mistral under licence after Blackburn had moved to Australia, possibly with Weltex's mould. A number of these cars are still in existence and Emslie and Flockton's mould is also believed to still exist. One of the Weltex Mistral bodies was fitted to the Stanton Special, which set the New Zealand land speed record at that time.

In 1989 a New Zealander, Roger Wilson, established Wilson Classics Sports Cars with the aim of building Mistral sports cars for use in classic car racing and for touring. A set of moulds were taken to modernize the original Mistral body. Several of the cars were built and successfully raced but demand was insufficient for a sustainable business and the venture ended. One of his cars, race number 360 and registration PK4975, was still in existence in 2015.

=== Elvis Presley ===
An American built Mistral, on an Austin Healey chassis, was used in a scene from the 1966 Elvis Presley movie Spinout.

== Scimitar ==
The Scimitar was a development of the Stilletto for a pre-Ruby Seven and based on a shorter 6' 3" wheelbase. The Stilletto was 6' 9".

== Toledo ==
The Toledo was the final design by Microplas and announced in October 1955.
