= Open-wheel car =

Type of automobile

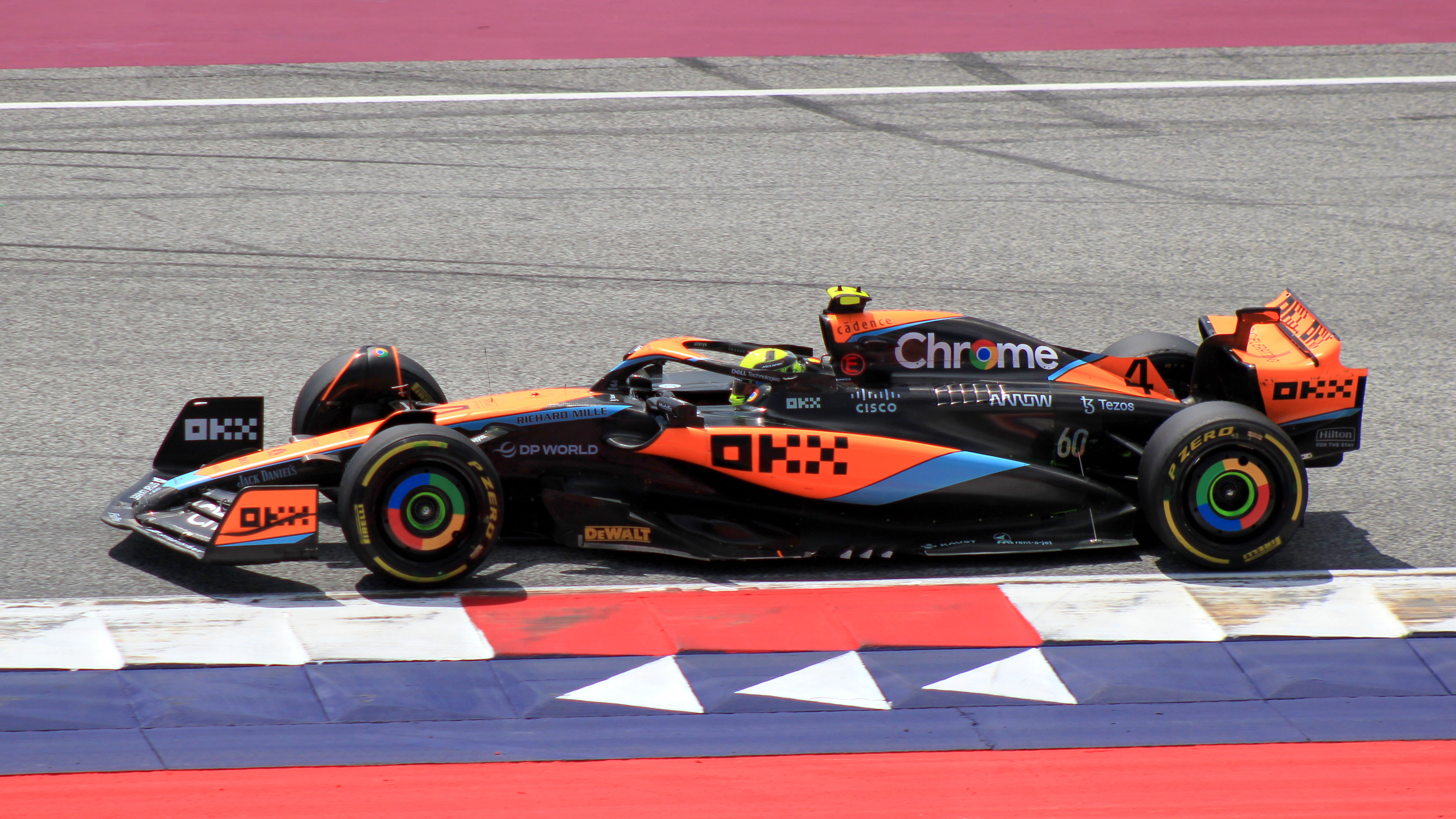
- 2023 Formula One car, McLaren MCL60, driven by Lando Norris
- Classification: Vehicle
- Application: Recreation, sports
- Fuel source: Gasoline, electric, hydrogen, Methanol, Nitromethane, Alcohol fuel, Electrofuel
- Powered: Yes
- Self-propelled: Yes
- Wheels: 4–6
- Aerofoils: Optional
- Axles: 2–4
- Inventor: Ray Harroun

An open-wheel car is a car with the wheels outside the car's main body, usually having only one seat. Open-wheel cars contrast with street cars, sports cars, stock cars, and touring cars, which have their wheels below the body or inside fenders. Open-wheel cars are built both for road racing and oval track racing. Open-wheel cars licensed for use on public roads, such as the Ariel Atom, are uncommon, as they are often impractical for everyday use.

== History ==
American racecar driver and constructor Ray Harroun was an early pioneer of the concept of a lightweight single-seater, open-wheel "monoposto" racecar. After working as a mechanic in the automotive industry, Harroun began competitive professional racing in 1906, winning the AAA National Championship in 1910. He was then hired by the Marmon Motor Car Company as chief engineer, charged with building a racecar intended to race at the first Indianapolis 500, which he went on to win. He developed a revolutionary concept which would become the originator and forefather of the single-seater (i.e. monoposto) racecar design. Harroun has also been credited by some as pioneering the rear-view mirror which appeared on his 1911 Indianapolis 500 winning car, though he himself claimed he got the idea from seeing a mirror used for a similar purpose on a horse-drawn vehicle in 1904.

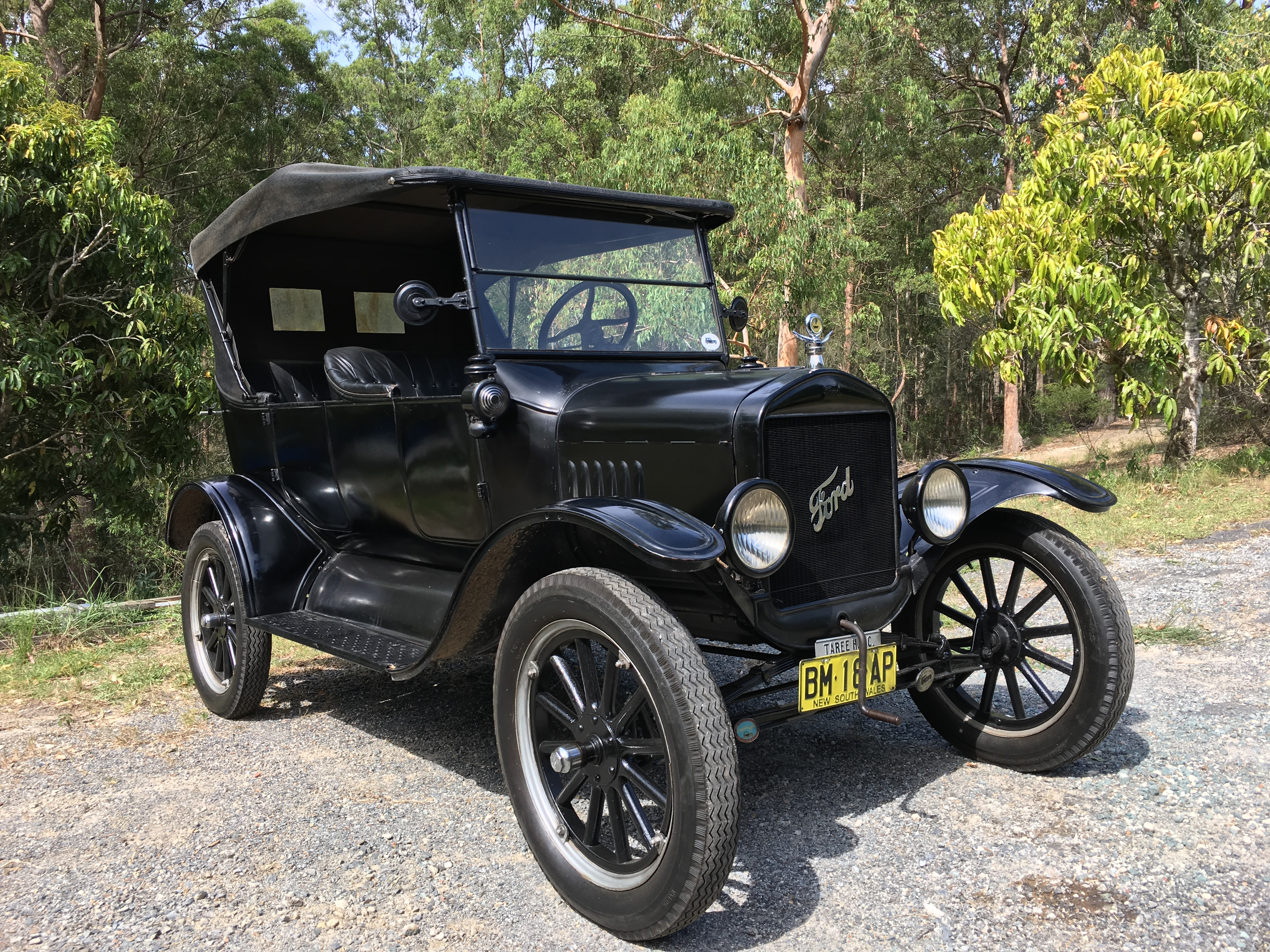
A Ford Model T, one of the most popular road-legal cars of the early 20th century. Note how the wheels are well outside the main body of the car, as was typical for the era.

Prior to World War II, street automobiles generally had wheels that protruded beyond the vehicle's main body, though they were typically covered with mudguards to protect the car body and following traffic from water and mud spray. With the advent of unibody vehicle construction, the desire to maximise interior space, to improve aerodynamics, and aircraft-inspired styling trends of the era, by the end of the 1950s the majority of new road-registerable vehicles had wheels that were under the main body of the car, and thus the open-wheel design became almost exclusively associated with racing vehicles.

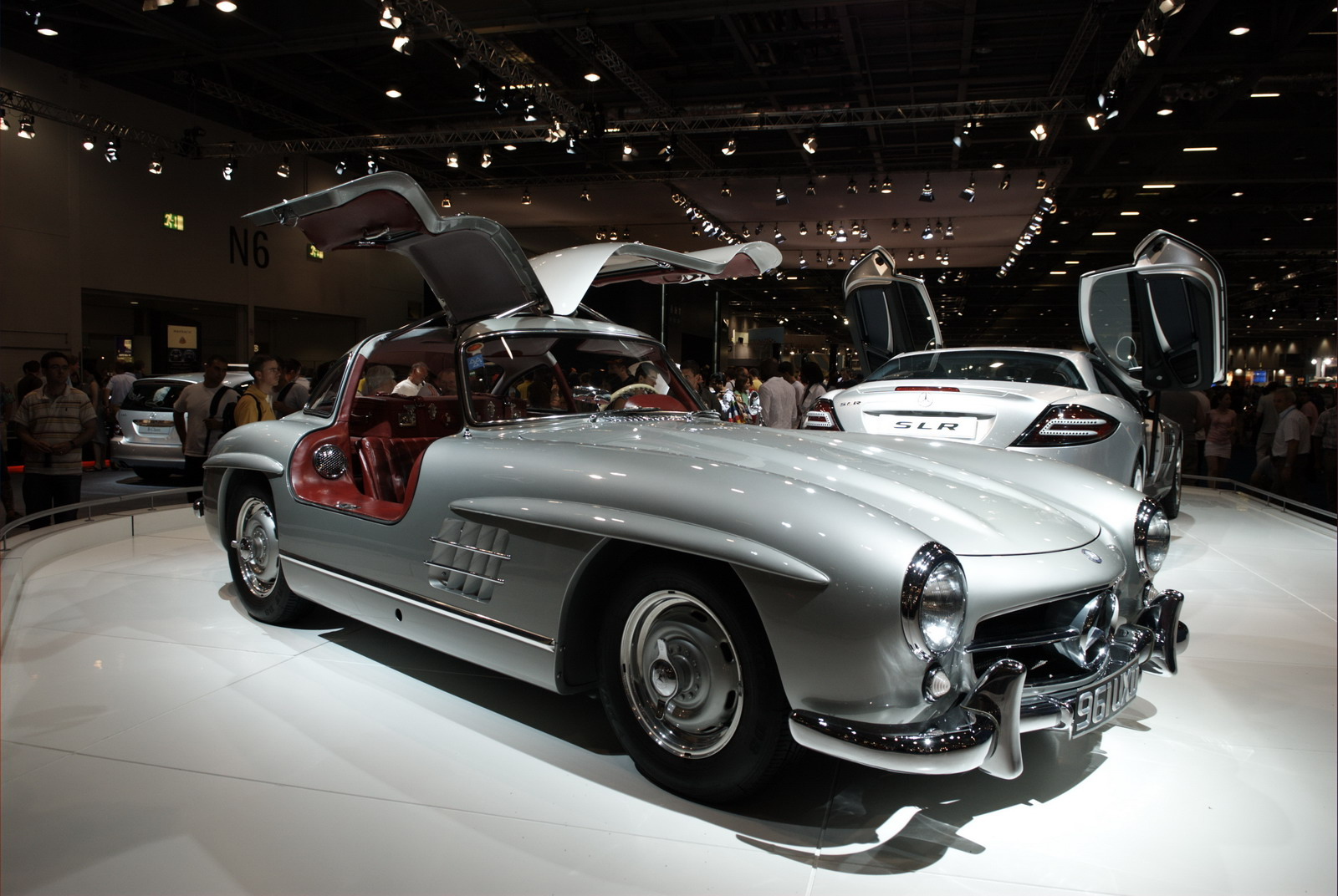
A 1954 Mercedes-Benz 300 SL which featured wheels under the main body of the vehicle, primarily for aerodynamic drag reduction

Formula One cars have almost exclusively used the open-wheel design throughout the history of the championship. The only notable exception was the "Monza body" variation of the Mercedes-Benz W196 racer of 1954–55, which covered the wheels with bodywork for aerodynamic reasons. Modern Formula One regulations mandate the open-wheel configuration.

== Design ==
A typical open-wheeler has a minimal cockpit, sufficient only to enclose the driver's body, with the head exposed to the air. In the Whelen Modified Tour and other short track modified series, the driver's head is contained in the car. Depending on the rules of the class, many types of open-wheelers have wings at the front and rear of the vehicle, as well as a very low and virtually flat undertray that helps achieve additional aerodynamic downforce pushing the car onto the road. While many other categories of racing cars produce downforce, the top categories of open-wheel racing cars (particularly Formula One and IndyCar) produce far more downforce relative to their mass than any other racing category, allowing much higher corner speeds on comparable tracks. However, this is not always the case; some open-wheel categories raced primarily as development or amateur categories, such as Formula Ford or Formula Vee, do not permit the use of wings or ground effect aerodynamics.

Virtually all modern open-wheelers have a mid-engined configuration with the engine between the driver and the rear axle line. While most early Formula One cars had a front-engined layout, the mid-engined Cooper T12 appeared in Formula One in the second-ever race in 1950. In 1958, a later mid-engined Cooper car won its first race and in 1959, Jack Brabham won the first championship in a mid-engined car. Every championship since has been won by a mid-engined car, and the vast majority of racing open-wheeler designs have followed this pattern. Notable modern exceptions include asphalt modified cars, such as the Whelen Modified Tour, and the Caterham Seven and its many imitators.

Some major races, such as the Singapore Grand Prix, Monaco Grand Prix (sanctioned by Formula One) and the Long Beach Grand Prix (sanctioned by IndyCar), are held on temporary street circuits. However, most open-wheel races are on dedicated road courses, such as Watkins Glen in the US, Nürburgring in Germany, Spa-Francorchamps in Belgium and Silverstone in Great Britain. In the United States, some top-level open-wheel events are held on ovals, of both short track and superspeedway variety, with emphasis more on speed and endurance than the maneuverability required for road and street course events. The Whelen Modified Tour is the only opened wheeled race car series endorsed by NASCAR. This series races on most of NASCAR's most famous tracks in the United States. Other asphalt modified series race on short tracks in the United States and Canada, such as Wyoming County International Speedway in New York. The best-attended oval race in the world is the annual Indianapolis 500 (Indy 500) in Speedway, Indiana, sanctioned by IndyCar; in the United States it is quite common to refer to open-wheel cars as IndyCars, because of their recognizable appearance and widespread popularity across America at the Indy 500. Compared to covered-wheel race cars, open-wheeled cars allow more precise placement of the front wheels on the race course, as the tires are clearly visible to the driver. This allows the maximum potential of the cars to be achieved during cornering and passing. Furthermore, open-wheeled cars are less tolerant of vehicle-to-vehicle contact, which usually results in vehicle damage and retiring, whereas some level of contact is expected in covered-wheel racing, as for example in NASCAR. Open-wheeled drivers must be extremely precise to avoid contact.

Regulations tend to permit much lower open-wheel car weights than in categories that more closely resemble street-legal vehicles, such as sports, touring, and stock cars. For instance, a Formula One car must weigh at least 798 kilograms (1,759 lb); the minimum weight for NASCAR is 1,500 kilograms (3,200 lb).

== Driving ==
Open-wheeled racing is among the fastest in the world. Formula One cars can reach speeds in excess of 360 kilometres per hour (220 mph). At Autodromo Nazionale Monza, Antônio Pizzonia of BMW Williams F1 team recorded a top speed of 369.9 kilometres per hour (229.8 mph) (over 102 m/s) in the 2004 Italian Grand Prix. Since the end of the V10 era in 2006, such high speeds have not been reached, with later vehicles reaching around 360 kilometres per hour (220 mph). It is difficult to give precise figures for the absolute top speeds of Formula One cars as the data are not generally released by teams. The 'speed traps' on fast circuits such as Monza give a good indication, but are not necessarily located at the point on the track where the car is travelling at its fastest. BAR Honda team recorded an average top speed of 400 kilometres per hour (250 mph) in 2006 at Bonneville Salt Flats, with unofficial top speed reaching 413 kilometres per hour (257 mph) using their modified BAR 007 Formula One car. Speeds on ovals can range in constant excess of 210–220 miles per hour (340–350 km/h), and at Indianapolis in excess of 230 miles per hour (370 km/h). In 2000, Gil de Ferran set the one-lap qualifying record of 241.428 miles per hour (388.541 km/h) at California Speedway. Even on tight non-oval street circuits such as the Grand Prix of Toronto, open-wheel Indy Cars attain speeds of 190 miles per hour (310 km/h).

Regardless of top speeds, Formula One open-wheel race cars hold the outright lap record at the circuits where they currently race due to their combination of top speed, acceleration, and cornering abilities in mixed tracks made of straights, corners and chicanes. For example, at the Monza Circuit the fastest lap in the 2021 Grand Prix (Daniel Ricciardo 1:24.812) is more than six seconds per lap faster than the fastest closed-wheel racing car, an LMP1 sports car, and more than 20 seconds per lap faster than the DTM touring car lap record.

Driving an open-wheel car is substantially different from driving a car with fenders. Virtually all Formula One and IndyCar drivers spend some time in various open-wheel categories before joining either top series. Open-wheel vehicles, due to their light weight, aerodynamic capabilities, and powerful engines, are often considered the fastest racing vehicles available and among the most challenging to master. Wheel-to-wheel contact is dangerous, particularly when the forward edge of one tire contacts the rear of another tire: since the treads are moving in opposite directions (one upward, one downward) at the point of contact, both wheels rapidly decelerate, torquing the chassis of both cars and often causing one or both vehicles to be suddenly and powerfully flung upwards (the rear car tends to pitch forward, and the front car tends to pitch backward.) An example of this is the 2005 Chicagoland crash of Ryan Briscoe and Alex Barron.

== Advantages ==
The lower weight of an open-wheel race car enables better braking, acceleration and agility, requiring no more than an extra gram of bodywork. While the exposure of the wheels to the airstream causes very high aerodynamic drag and turbulence at high speeds, it also allows for improved cooling of the brakes, which is important on various road courses because of their frequent changes in pace. It also allows the driver to see unobstructed views of the tires while showing more convenient details from the inside out when going in for pit stops.

== Gallery ==
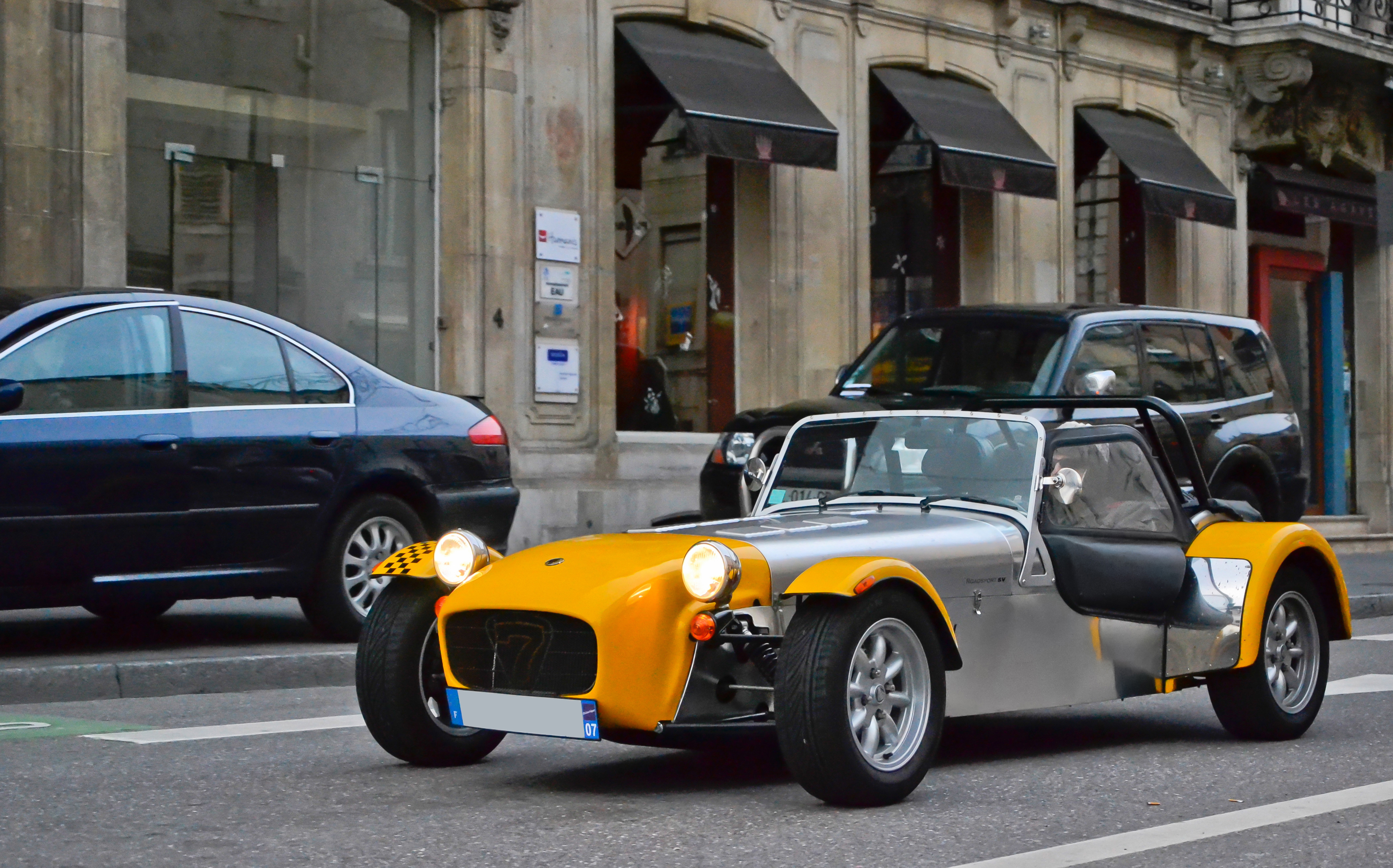
Caterham open wheeled sports car, derived from Lotus 7

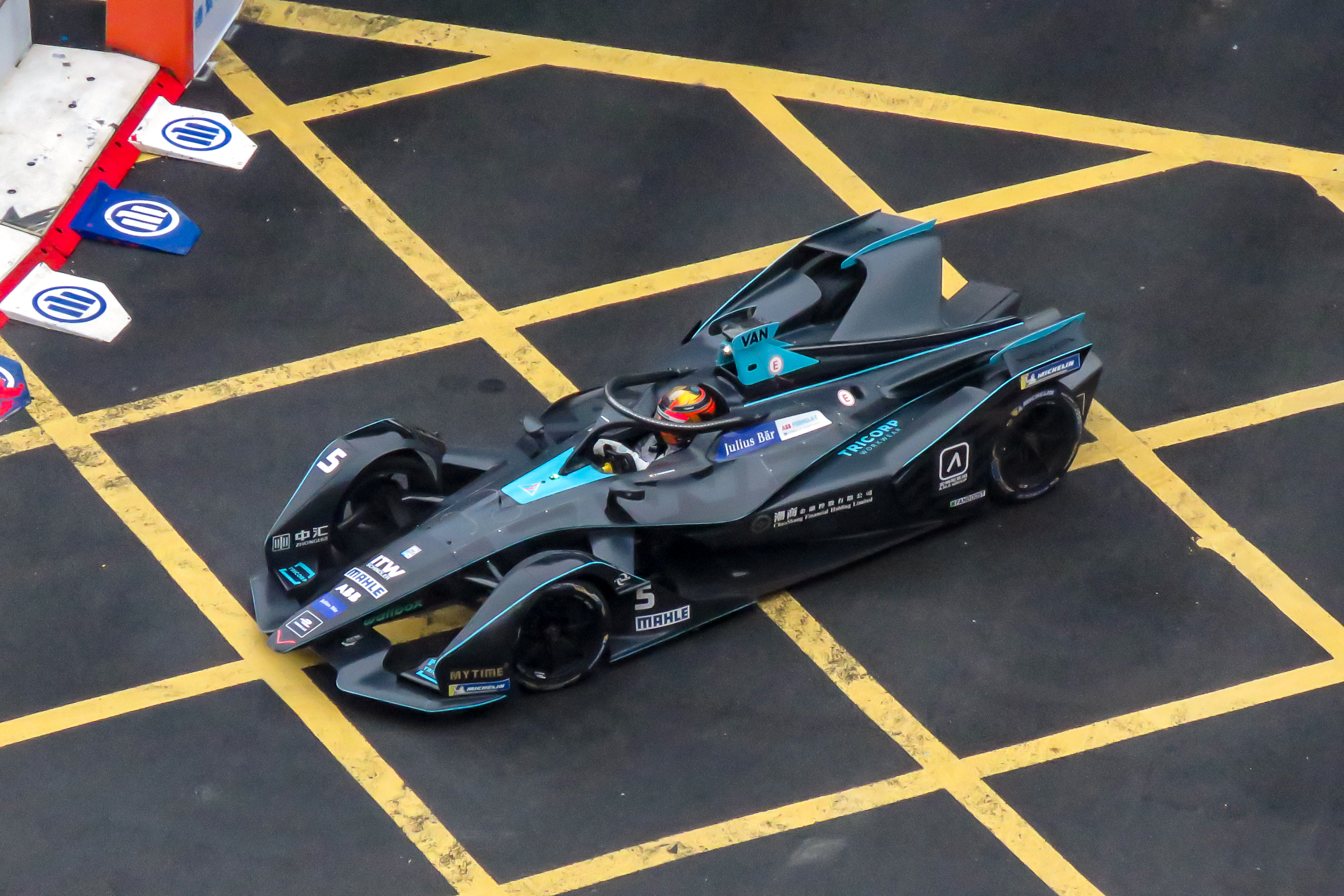
Electric Formula E racing car (Spark SRT05e) racing for HWA Racelab

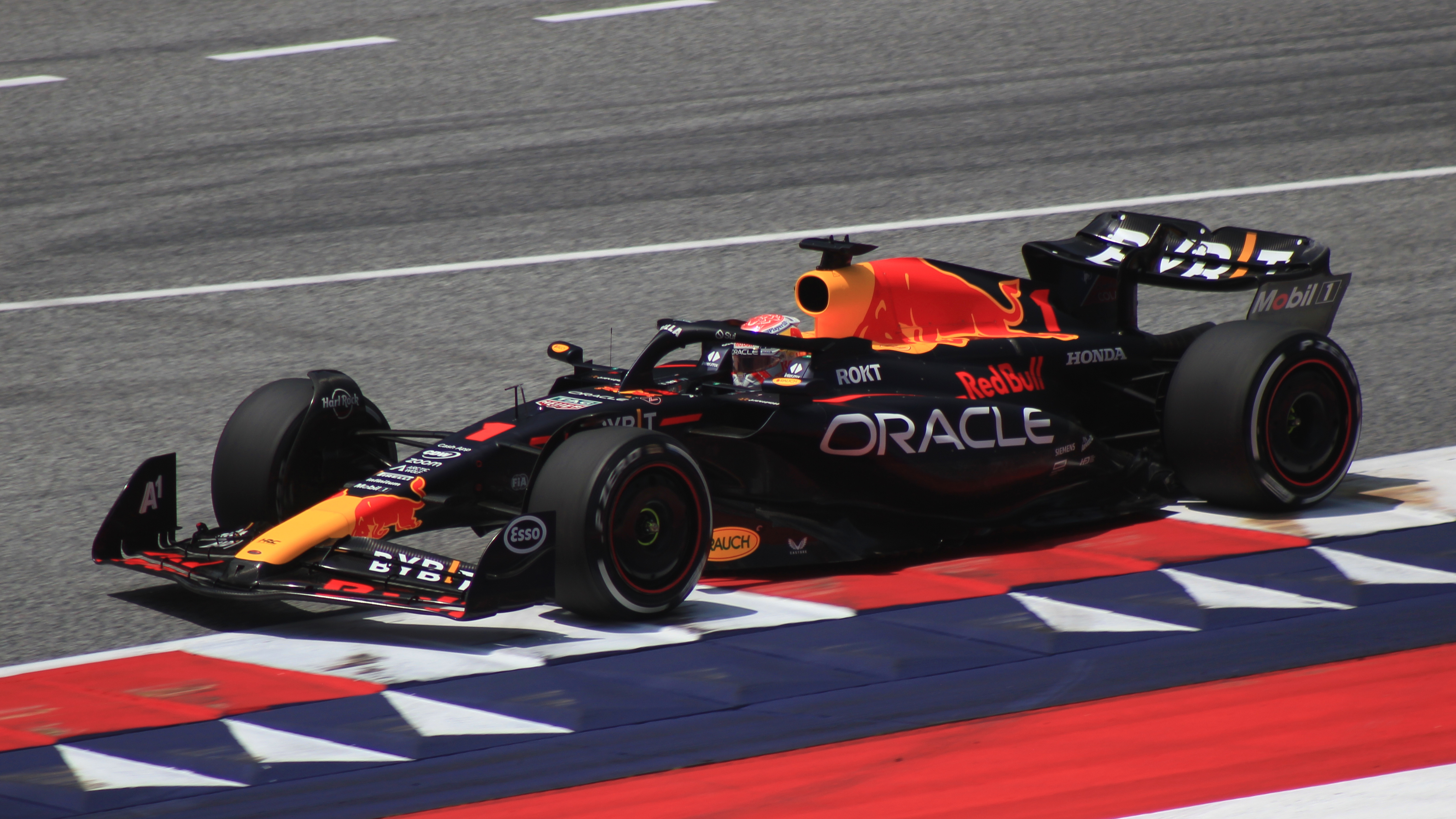
2023 Red Bull Racing RB19, driven by Max Verstappen

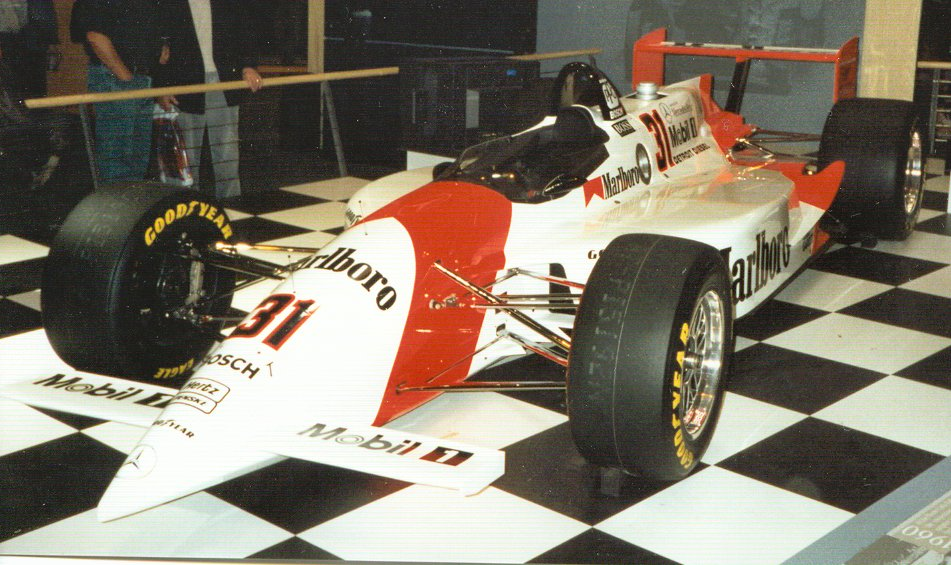
1994 Penske Indy Car

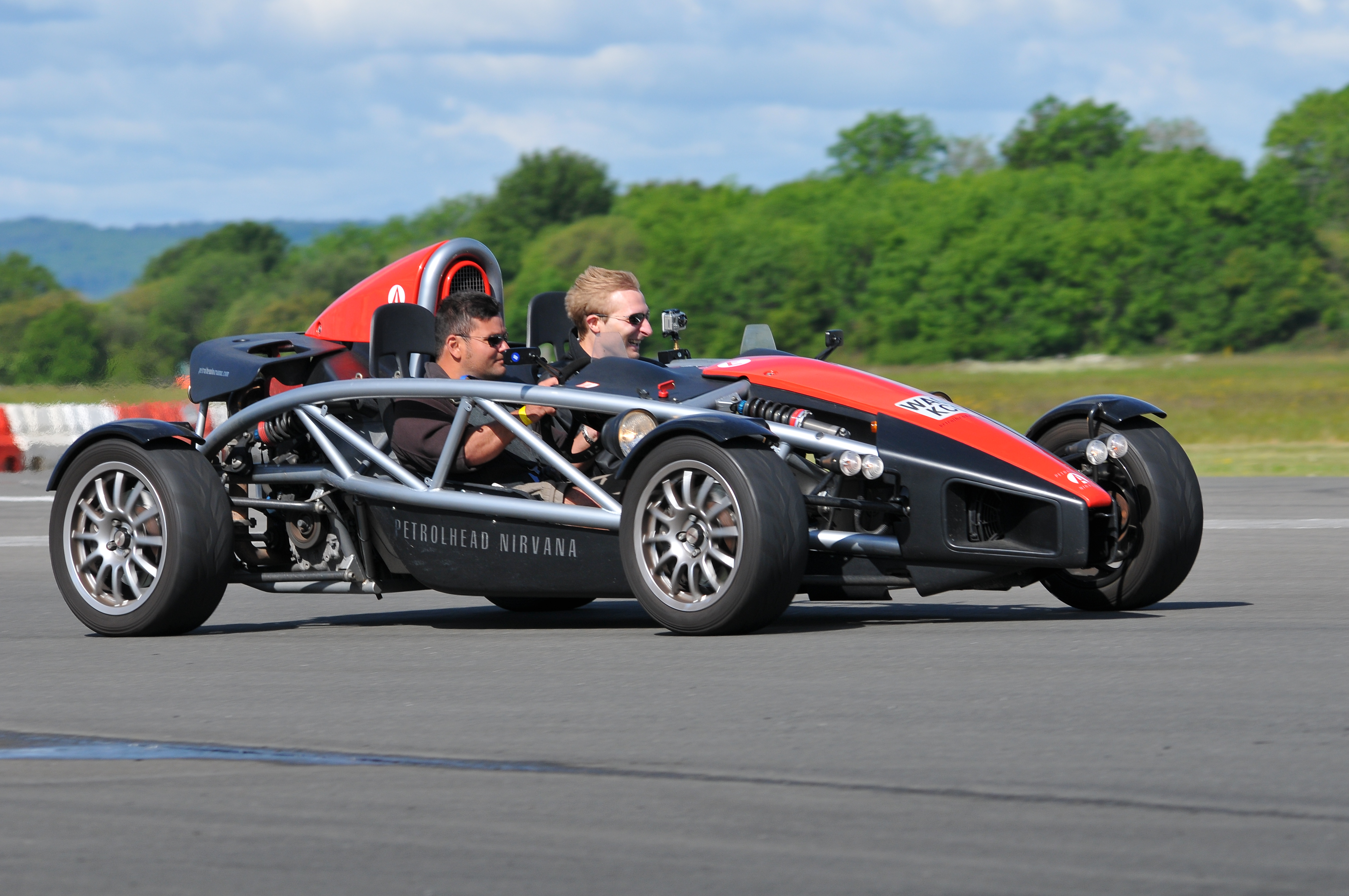
Ariel Atom sports car from UK

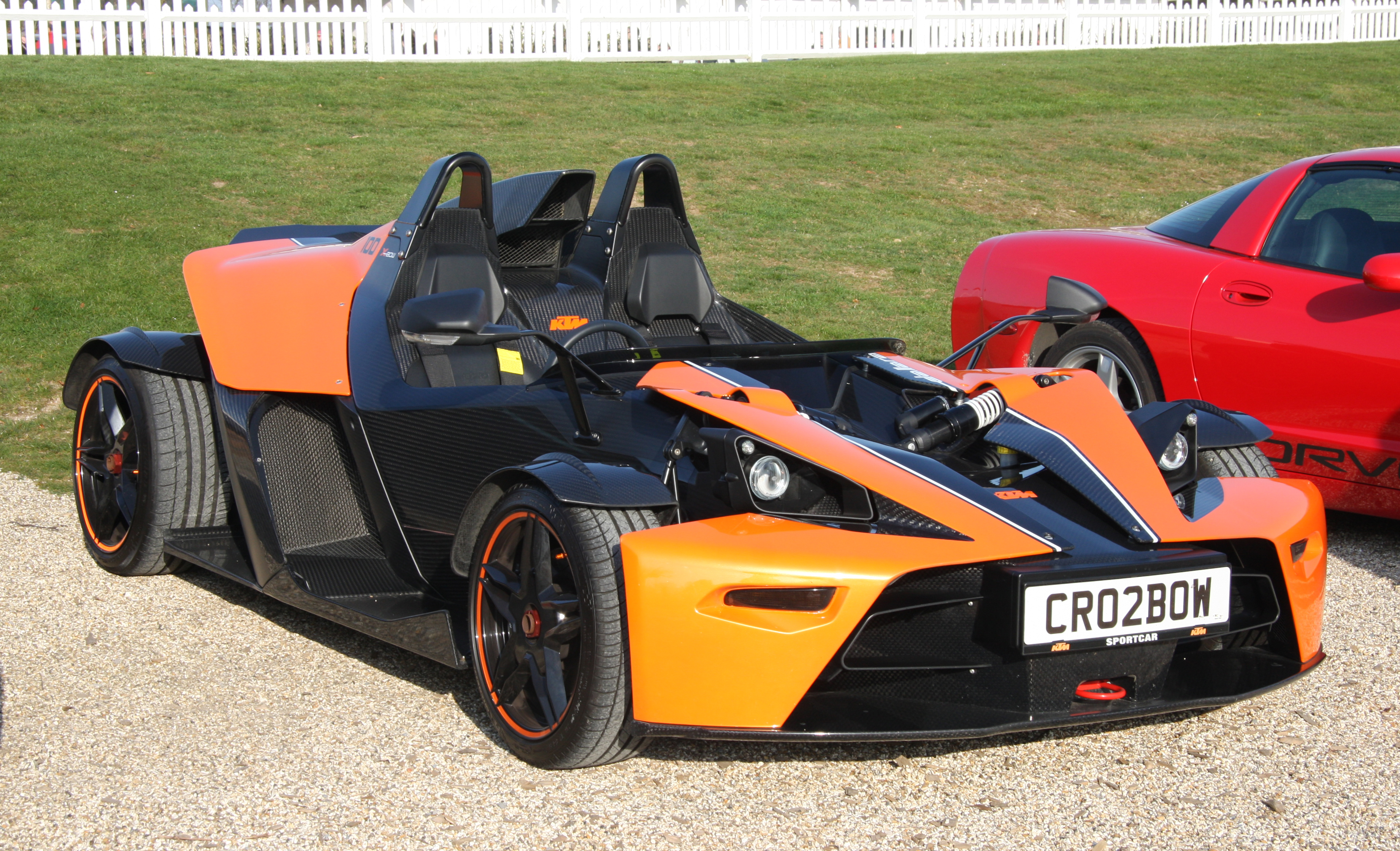
KTM X-Bow, road legal open wheeled sportscar

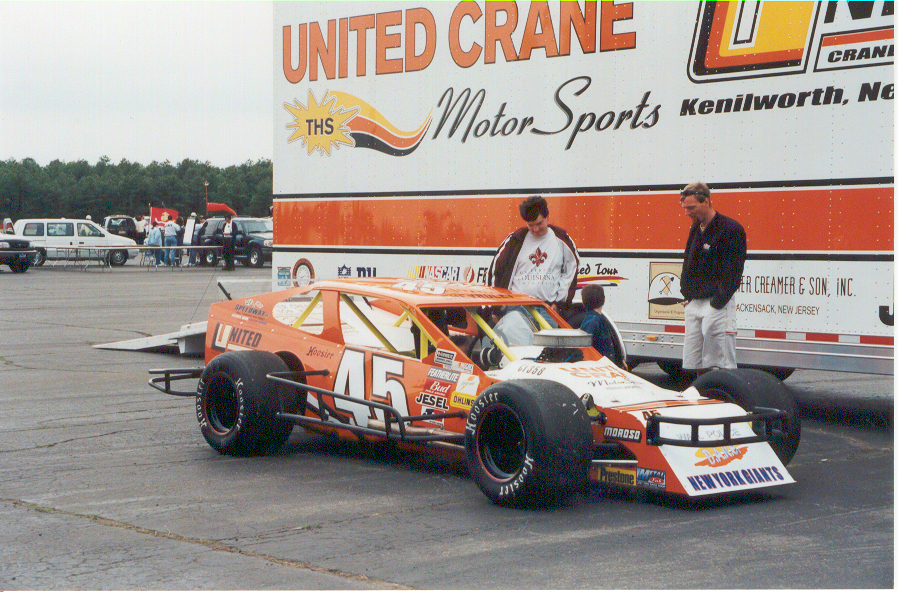
Asphalt Modified Short Track Race Car

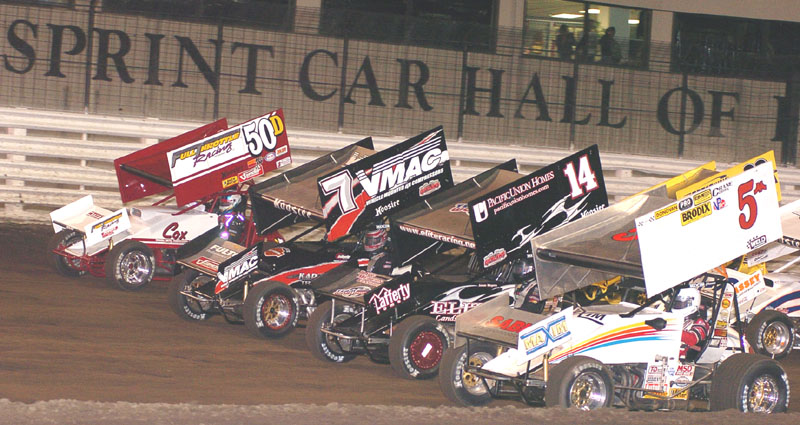
Sprint cars

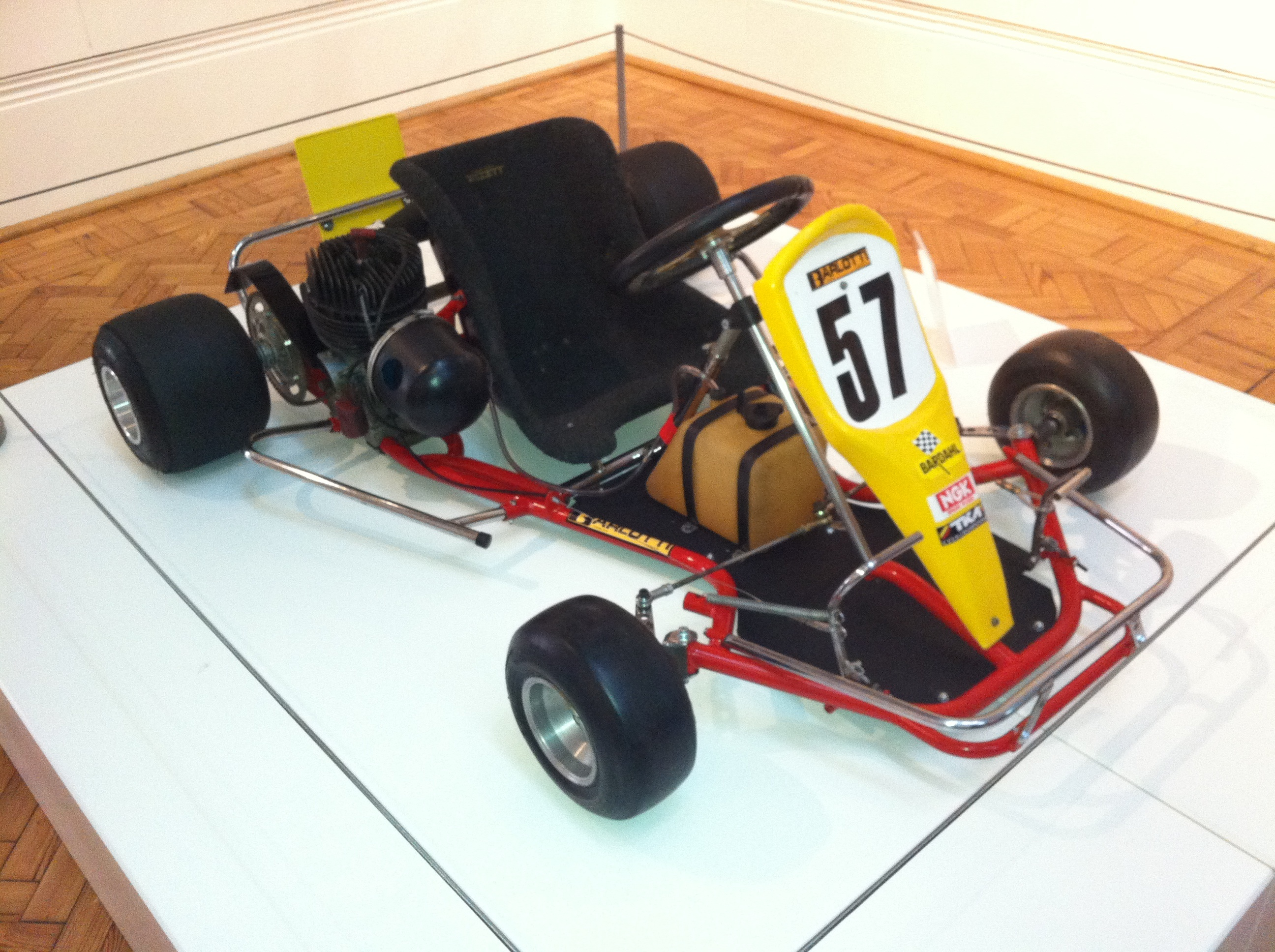
A Barlotti go-kart: a low-end open-wheel car

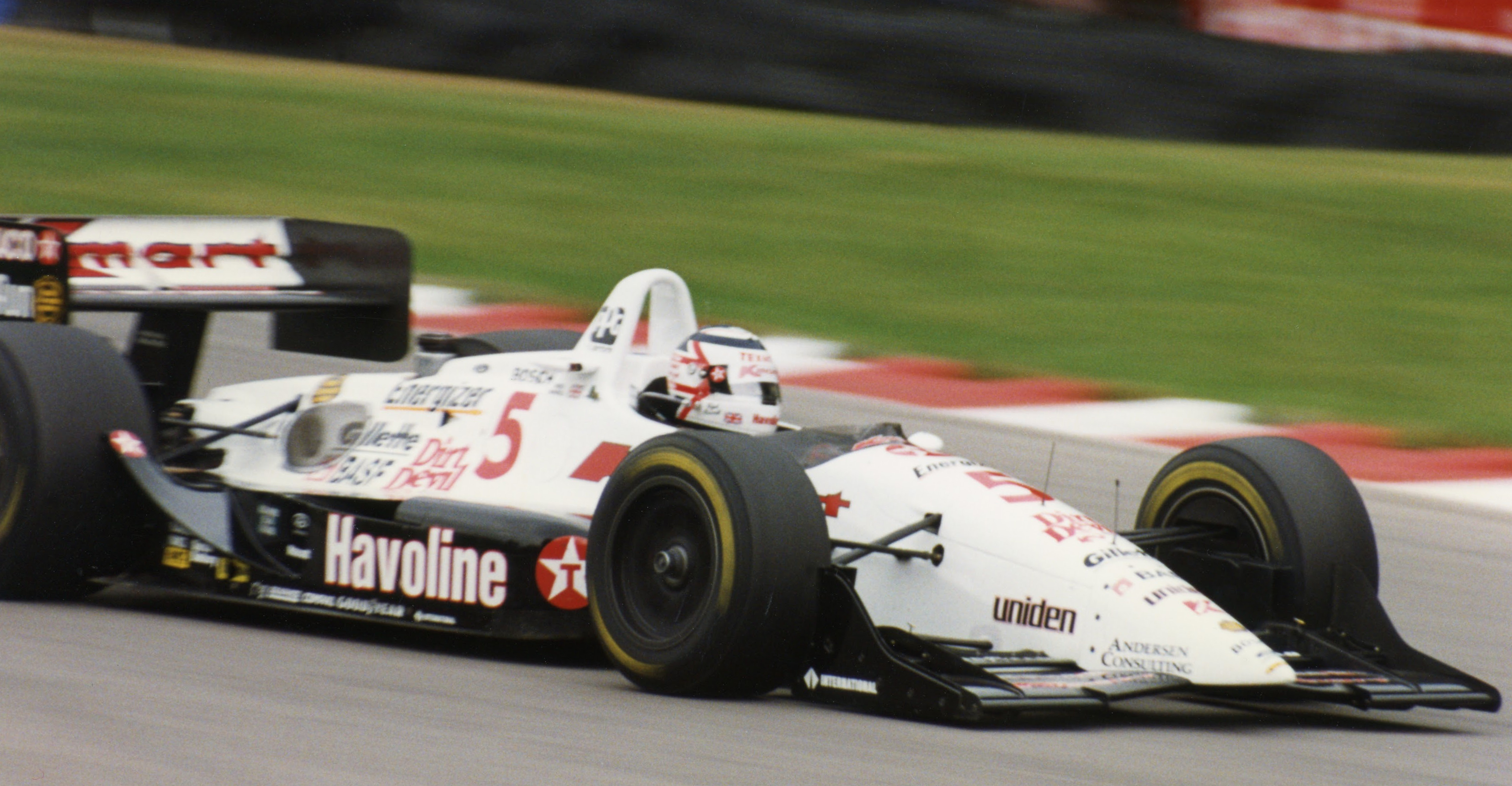
Nigel Mansell in a CART car at Mid-Ohio Sports Car Course, 1993

== Safety ==
In 2018, several single-seater series, such as Formula One, Formula 2 (with their new Dallara F2 2018 chassis), and Formula E (with their new Spark SRT05e chassis), introduced a protection system to the cockpit called the "halo", a wishbone-shaped frame aimed to deflect debris away from a driver's head. Despite initial criticism, including for the reason of obstructing the driver's vision, it gained some praise in the Formula 2 sprint race in Catalunya when Nirei Fukuzumi spun and had the back of his car land on fellow countryman Tadasuke Makino's halo. In the 2018 Formula 1 Belgian Grand Prix, McLaren driver Fernando Alonso was sent airborne after being hit from behind by the Renault of Nico Hülkenberg and struck the halo of Sauber driver Charles Leclerc, thereby saving the Monegasque driver from a visor strike.

In 2019, the newly-formed FIA Formula 3 Championship introduced a halo to their new chassis, which was unveiled at the 2018 Abu Dhabi Grand Prix.

In 2020, the IndyCar Series adopted a halo combined with an aeroscreen, built by Red Bull Advanced Technologies.

At the start of the 2018 Belgian Grand Prix, Fernando Alonso was launched into the air after being hit from behind by Nico Hülkenberg, flying directly over Charles Leclerc. The halo deflected the full weight of Alonso's car and wheel, protecting Leclerc from head impact and potential fatal injuries as it left deep tire marks across the titanium frame.

At the start of the 2020 Bahrain Grand Prix, Romain Grosjean collided with Daniil Kvyat, in which his car broke in two and burst into flames as it split the barrier. The halo helped protect Grosjean from possible decapitation while it allowed him to escape from the fire.

During Lap 26 of the 2021 Italian Grand Prix, Max Verstappen and Lewis Hamilton collided. Verstappen’s car bounced off the curb, launched into the air, and landed directly on top of Hamilton’s cockpit.

At the start of the 2022 British Grand Prix, Zhou Guanyu flipped upside down after contact on the main straight, sliding across the asphalt at 160 mph. The impact instantly collapsed the car's main roll hoop, leaving the halo as the sole barrier preventing Zhou's head from scraping against the track before the vehicle vaulted over the tire wall.
