= Cabin cruiser =

Type of Motorboat which has a cabin for the captain and passengers

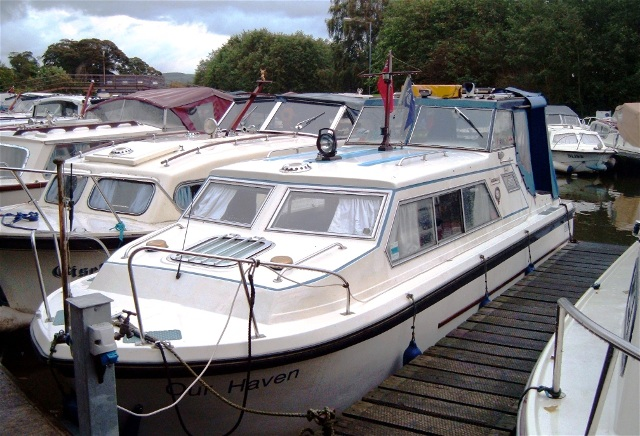
Numerous cabin cruisers moored at a marina in the United Kingdom

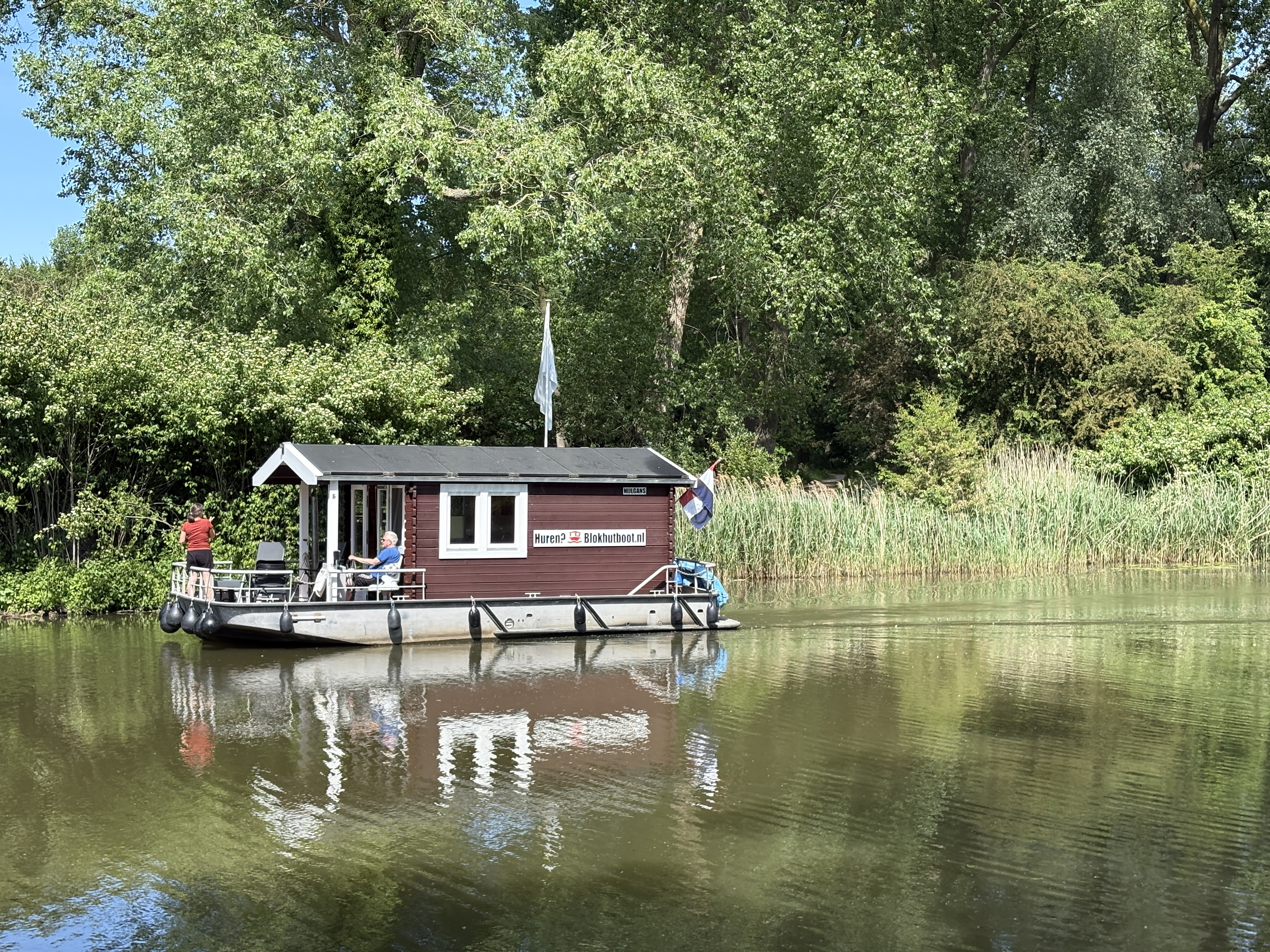
A cabin boat is a type of cross-over between a cabin cruiser and a house boat. Often they take the form of small holiday homes for short term rentals, built on a motorized pontoon, such as here in the Netherlands

A cabin cruiser is a type of power boat that provides accommodation for its crew and passengers inside the structure of the craft.

A cabin cruiser usually ranges in size from 7.6 to 13.7 m (25 to 45 ft) in length, with larger pleasure craft usually considered yachts. Many cabin cruisers can be recovered and towed with a trailer and thus easily stored on land, which reduces maintenance and expense. These craft are generally equipped with a head (toilet), a galley, and at least one berth. Most cabin cruisers usually have a small dining area and some have an aft cabin (a cabin to the rear of the cockpit, with a double bed). Some cabin cruisers are equipped with heating, air conditioning, and power generators. Most also have water heaters and shore power electric systems.

The cabin cruiser provides many of the amenities of larger yachts while costing much less and normally being fully operable by the owner, whereas larger yachts often require a professional crew.

Most newer cabin cruisers are faster than older models because of improved aerodynamic and hydrodynamic designs. Cabin cruisers are generally able to handle the water well because of their size and give a stable ride. They are generally spacious in the cockpit (open seating area towards aft or centre).

In the UK, purpose-built cabin cruisers were popular on the canal network in the 1960s and 1970s. Leading manufacturers were Norman, Viking, Microplus, Freeman, and Dawncraft. Today, they are more commonly found on the navigable rivers rather than canals.

== See also ==
- Boat
- Narrowboat
- Motor launch
- Launch
