= Hamilton Walker (inventor) =

New Zealand engineer and inventor (1903–1990)

- Born: 10 November 1903
- Died: 31 May 1990 (aged 86)

Hamilton Walker (10 November 1903 – 31 May 1990) was a Whangārei, New Zealand, engineer, inventor, and farmer who developed and patented a variety of rotary engine designs. He was the creator of New Zealand's first rotary engine.

== Background ==
Walker was born 10 November 1903, the third son of James Thompson Walker and Annie Beatrice Douglas. He attended Whangarei Technical School. In 1925 Walker married Vera Sophia Lovett. He took up farming, and in the 1930s began experimenting with rotary engines. Walker died 31 May 1990.

== Rotary engines ==
Between 1957 and 1977 Walker was a full-time inventor. In 1961 Walker formed a company called Hamilton Walker Rotary Engines Limited with the aim of producing engines for a wide range of vehicles from lawn mowers to airplanes. From 1964 to 1967 he designed at least 16 engines in his farm shed, and patented many of them. In 1967 the Sydney Morning Herald ran an article that said several Australian and English manufacturers were interested in his engines. Walker also had designed an elliptical shaped car to use the engine in. Walker's engine is believed to be the second working rotary engine after the Wankel engine. A prototype engine was under construction in 1968.

== Rotarymotive (alternative name: Crowther Sedan) ==
In the 1960s all New Zealand assembled cars, except for the Trekka, were CKDs from overseas. Even the Trekka relied on Skoda for its engine. Roly Crowther, a New Zealand speedway driver, heard about Walker's work on rotary engines. Crowther considered that an almost fully indigenously produced vehicle should be possible using Walker's engine in a fiber glass bodied car.

Work began on the design and development of the car in 1965. Ferris de Joux was approached to design a two-door four seat fiber glass bodied car and Dennis Smith was tasked with designing the chassis. The car was to be rear engined and powered by a Walker Rotary engine coupled to a DAF Variomatic transmission. Toyota instruments and lighting was to be used. The front suspension was from a Triumph Herald and modified to suit. The rear suspension was independent.

By 1968 the prototype was completed at Mount Wellington, Auckland, but the Walker engine was still under development. As a temporary measure an NSU Prinz air cooled engine was fitted. The car was initially named the Rotarymotive and testing begun. It was slightly bigger than a Morris 1100. The rotary engine weighed under 20 kg and produced between 60 and 100 bhp.

A new company Pacific Auto Industries (NZ) Limited was formed (a combination of Rotarymotive and UEB Industries Limited) with UEB's Sir James Doig as chairman with the aim of producing the car. A second prototype was planned for later in 1970 or early 1971 using a 1200cc Hamilton Walker rotary engine. The company was formed just one month after the Anziel Nova development was dropped, but failed to raise the funds needed to start production despite an Australian firm indicating it wanted to import 5000 cars a year.

The prototype was still in existence in 2011. Crowther went on make the Crowther Toiler in the mid-1970s.

== Other inventions ==
Apart from the rotary engines and car, Walker completed a number of inventions such as the internal-head diesel and the 1965 Walker air-cushioned hydrofoil craft.

== Photographs ==
- Hamilton Walker and his rotary engine
- Rotarymotive (Crowther Sedan)
- Crowther Toiler
