= Norman boat =

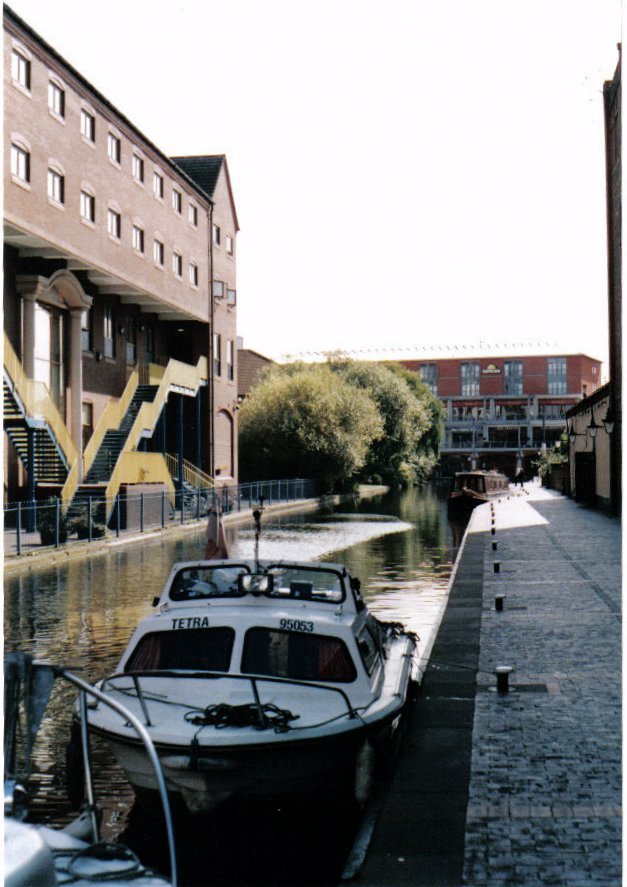
A Norman 18 in Gas Street Basin, Birmingham, England

Norman boats are small fiberglass cabin cruisers built in the 1960s, 1970s, and 1980s, by Norman Cruisers Limited of Shaw and Crompton in Greater Manchester, England.

Norman Boats were started in 1959 by Ernie Wheeldon. The business started in Shaw Lancs, then moved to Isherwood Street in Heywood Lancs, then back to a new site in Shaw. Other factories were added in Royton and Heywood, and the business expanded into manufacturing windows and windscreens for both Norman Boats and other customers under the name of North West Windows Ltd at the Heywood factory. They also made boat canopies and upholstery under the name of North West Marine Trimmers Ltd at the Padiham & Lancashire factory, where they also made boat trailers (Speedmaster Trailers).

At the height of the business in 1971-1973 the business employed approximately 200 people, approximately 120 in boatbuilding and approximately 70 glass fibre laminators, of which approximately 30 were female. Norman Cruisers were in the top three largest pleasure boat builders in the UK, Westerley Yachts being the biggest.

In the 1970s approximately 65% of boats were exported. Principal markets (in order of volume) were the Netherlands, Germany, Norway, France and Sweden. Boats in the Netherlands were imported by Internaut of Rotterdam and were sold under the name of "Inter", hence the 20 was the Inter620.

The business ceased trading in December 1979, the Winter of Discontent, and restarted in 1980. New models were introduced: 24, 27 and 22 wide beam but the moulding shop was destroyed in a fire in 1982, destroying most of the moulds and the business never recovered. Some moulds were re-built and when the business finally ceased, these were sold and marketed under other names, such as the Atlanta 24. Also some designs were copied and made into hybrids. Mr. Wheeldon once estimated that approximately 7,000 Normans were built.

Norman Cruisers went bankrupt in the 1980s. Many examples of their product range are still in use, and can be seen on British waterways and across the world.

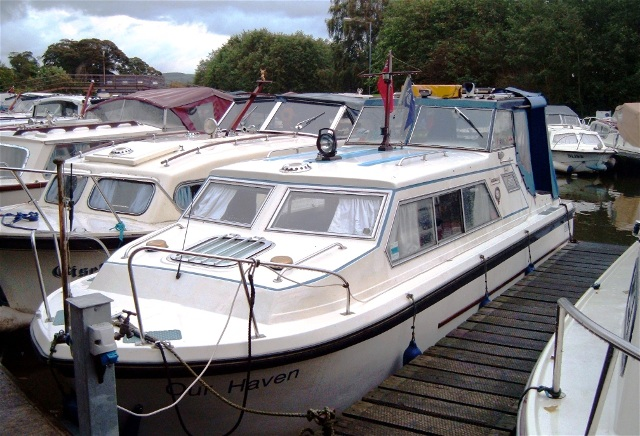
Our Haven2
