= Derek Buckler =

Chadwick Derek Frank Buckler (26 September 1910 – 3 March 1964), commonly called Derek Buckler, is founder of a limited production British sports car company, Buckler Cars Ltd.

== Background ==
Buckler was born in Hornsey, London. He was educated at Tottenham Grammar School and S Thomas College. From 1927 to 1929 he trained as an engineer with Frank Buckler Ltd. Followed by working for the legal firm Crossman Block and Co to 1933. In 1934 he joined Watford Dairies as a Transport and Sales Manager. He became a Director of the engineering firm Johnson Roberts Ltd in 1939, was at coach builders W. C. Ford Ltd. until 1956, and starting in 1945 worked at Rivers Motors (Reading) Ltd.

Buckler was Managing Director of Bucklers of Reading Ltd and Buckler Cars Ltd. He was also a committee member of the Hants and Berks Motor Club and belonged to BARC, Hants and Berks Motor Club, London Motor Club, and the Athenaeum Club, Reading.

== Buckler Cars Ltd. ==
In 1939, Buckler started a precision engineering business in Reading which undertook work for the motor trade. In 1947 he formed Buckler Cars Limited and began to produce sports cars, primarily for racing.

The first model, based on Buckler's own very successful 1947 Buckler Special, was called the Mark V. Buckler allegedly did not want people to think it was the first car.

After success in the early and mid-1950s, the popularity of Buckler cars waned. He gained new success building go karts in the 1960s. Due to ill health, Buckler sold his company in 1962.

After being in poor health for some time, Buckler died in 1964.
