= Buckler Cars =

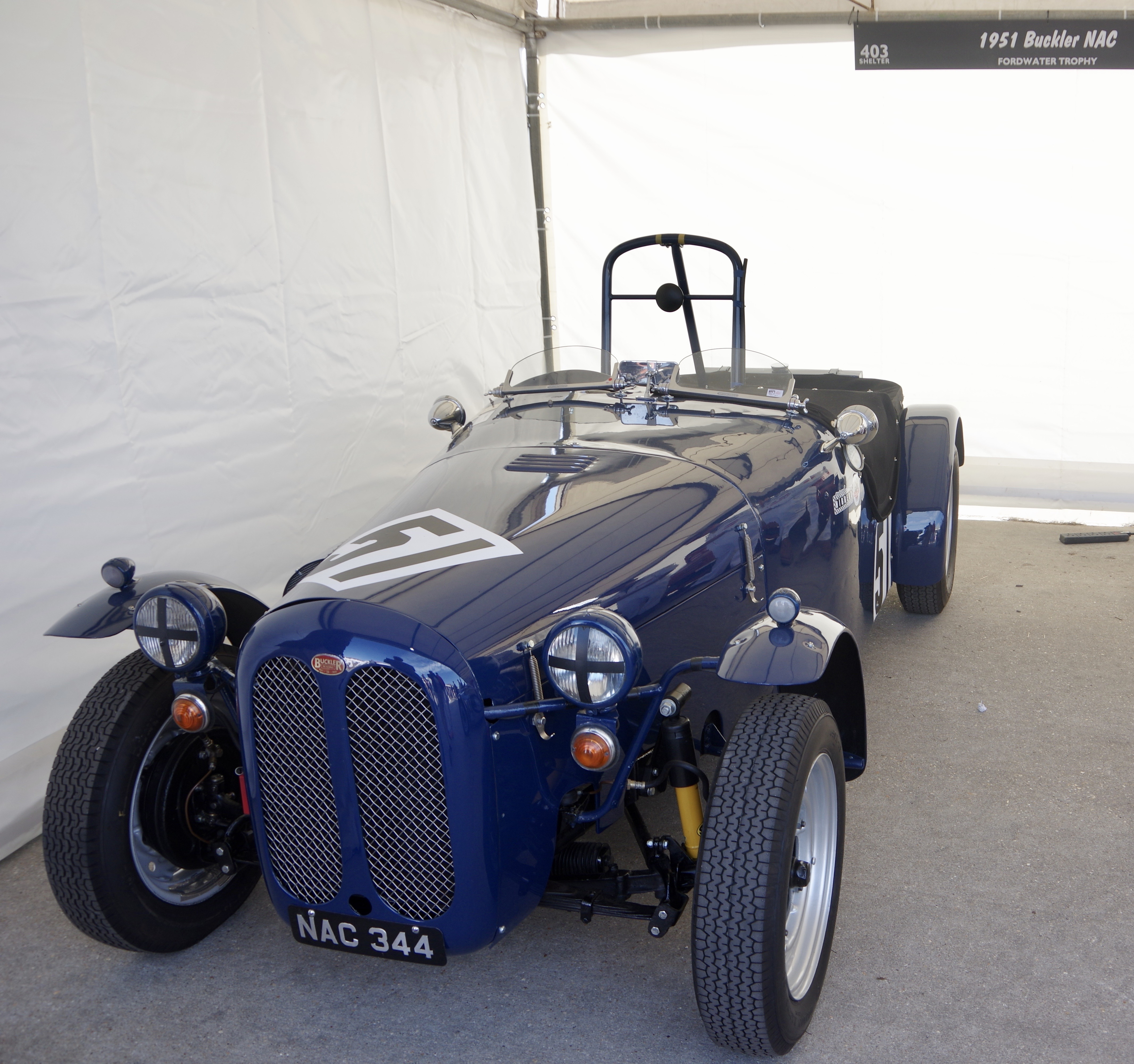
A Buckler car built in 1951

The Buckler Cars company founded by C. D. F. Buckler was based at 67 Caversham Road, Reading, Berkshire, England and produced approximately 400 cars between 1947 and 1962. In about 1947, Buckler took over the Welco Farm Implements Ltd at Crowthorne, Berkshire and a plaque can be seen on the site of the former factory.

== Background ==
=== Buckler Cars Limited ===
Bucklers were unusual in that they featured spaceframe construction. The cars were of high quality and supplied either fully built to order with a works body or optionally and mostly in component form for home completion. They were designed to accept a range of mechanical components to enable buyers to create a lightweight sports car suitable for road use and in rallies, trials, speed hillclimbs or racing. The first model, based on Derek Buckler's own very successful 1947 Buckler Special, was called the Mark V. Buckler allegedly did not want people to think it was the first car.

After success in the early and mid-1950s, Buckler's popularity waned during the later 1950s as other manufacturers came on the scene and when the kit-car market suffered a reversal in the early 1960s. However Buckler had considerable success entering the new go kart market in the 1960s, led by Jack Barlow. Due to ill health, Buckler sold his company in 1962. Once Buckler sold the company it seemed to lose momentum and the new owners, Mike Luff and Frank Fletcher, closed it down in 1965. Buckler, who had been in poor health for some time, died in 1964.

In addition to making cars, Buckler's made gear sets for other companies including Lotus Cars. They also built the first racing car chassis for the Brabham MRD.

== Overseas ==
During the 1950s Buckler's were exported globally. In New Zealand Arthur Harris managed Buckler (NZ) Limited. The first Mk90 registered to race in New Zealand in October 1956 was owned by Merv Mayo and powered by a Ford 100E engine.

== Car models ==
It was the policy of the company that the specifications of all the cars was very flexible around a central design concept, as each car, kit or chassis was built to order. Basically there were about 12 model types over a period of almost 20 years.

Model Name	Year	
Mark V	1949–1955	1172 cc Ford engine. Top speed 80 mph (130 km/h). Open 2 seater. 90-inch (2,286 mm) wheelbase.
Mark VI	1950–1955	Long 94-inch (2,388 mm) wheelbase version of Mark V.
Mark X	1950	1172 cc Ford engine. Open three seat aluminium body.
Mark XI	1950	Long-wheelbase Mark X.
Mark XV	1950	BMC A-Series engined cars.
Mark XVI	1950	MG based version of Mark XV.
90	1953–1957	1172 cc Ford engine. UK Works aluminium body designed by Derek Buckler. New Zealand bodies designed by Ferris de Joux.
DD1	1956	Coventry Climax 1098 cc FWA engine or FWB 1460 cc. De Dion rear suspension. Body as per Buckler 90 model above.
DD2	1957–1962	Various engines up to 2 Litres. Optional De Dion rear suspension.Mostly Microplas Mistral GRP bodyshell, also Convair and AKS etc.
BB100	1958–1962	Backbone tubular steel chassis. Aluminium body designed by Derek Buckler.

== See also ==
- Ferris de Joux
- Microplas
- List of car manufacturers of the United Kingdom
