= Microplus =

1960s and 1970s range of fibreglass boats

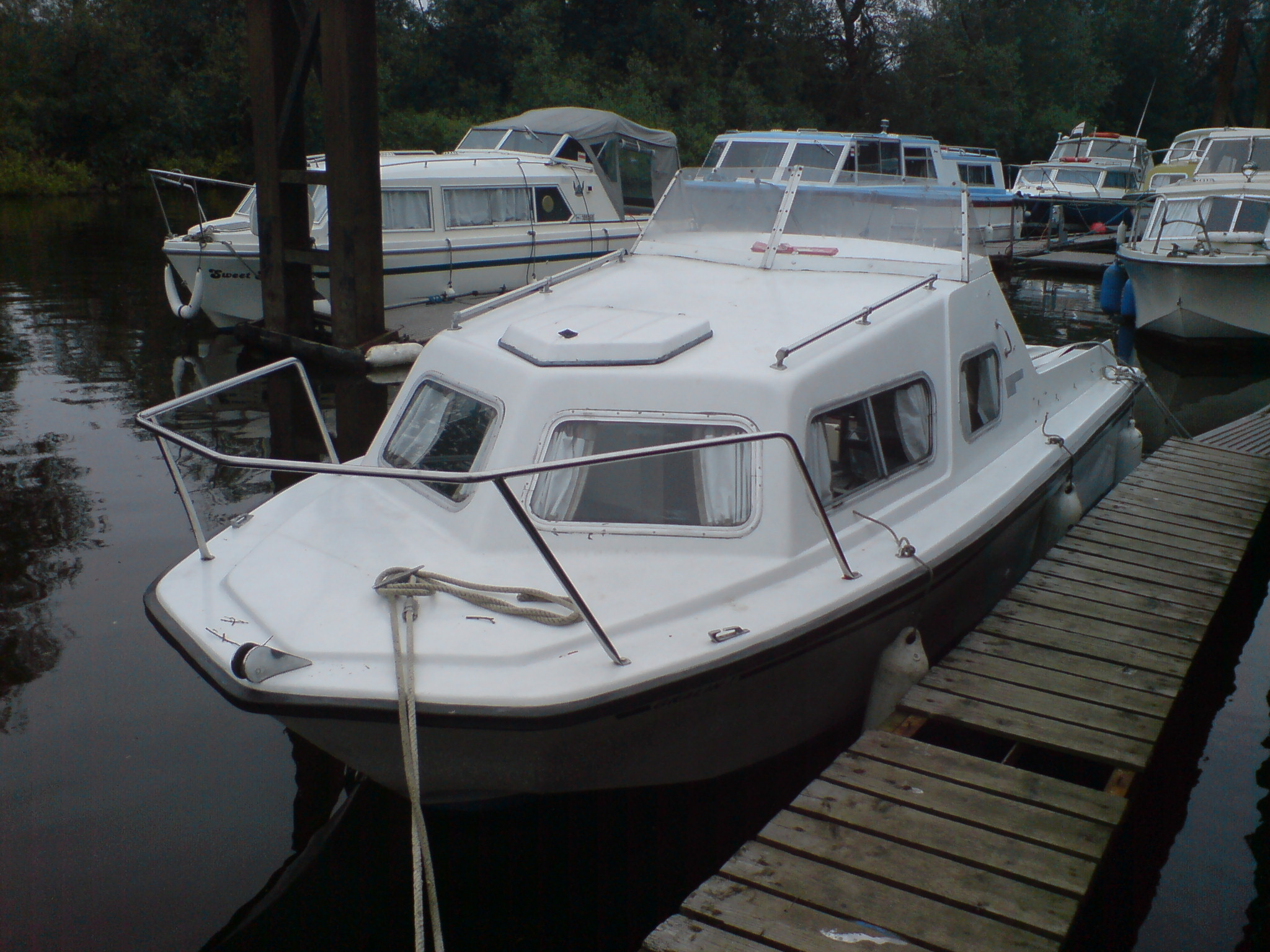
A Microplus 561 on the River Ouse near York

Microplus were a range of GRP boats (glass reinforced plastic - or fibreglass) produced in the UK in the 1960s and 1970s.

Originally trading as Microplas, the company has its origins in the 1950s producing bodyshells for a small number of fibreglass sports cars. However, by 1958 the company had started producing Microplas boats.

In the mid-1970s the company split into two manufacturing groups, Microplas and Chrisidon Marine Limited. Microplas continued to produce body shells and later plastic pipes, while Chrisidon Marine manufactured the boats, by now renamed Microplus.

== Models ==
Over the years of trading, Microplus / Microplas produced a wide range of boats, from small cabin cruisers, through to small fishing boats and a speedboat.

Generally the model name has a direct correlation with the overall length of the completed moulding.

== Owners Club ==
An enthusiast and owner has created a website and forum dedicated to the history, maintenance and running of the Microplus marque at:
