= Barlotti =

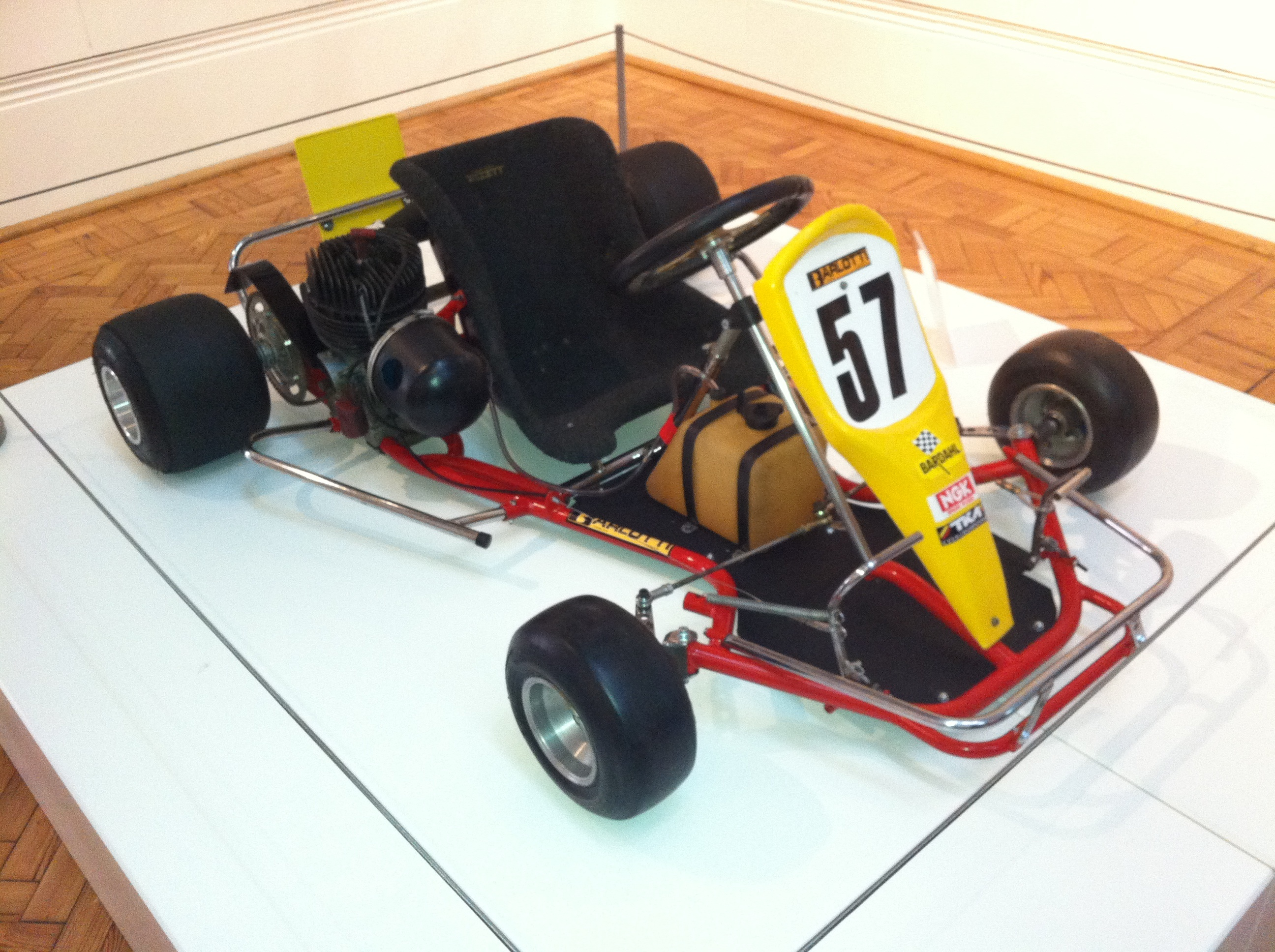
Barlotti kart on display in Reading Museum, May 2012

Barlotti was a manufacturer of karts based in Reading, England, a successor of the kart developments at Buckler Cars of Crowthorne. The name comes from the surname of founder Jack Barlow - Barlow's lot in it, according to an article from 1966.

The company was run by Jack Barlow in converted stables in Lydford Road. Barlow had been apprenticed to Buckler, and led that company's efforts in kart building in the 1960s, before they closed. The last kart was built in 1990.
